= List of Blackpink live performances =

List of live performances by South Korean girl group Blackpink

Blackpink live performances
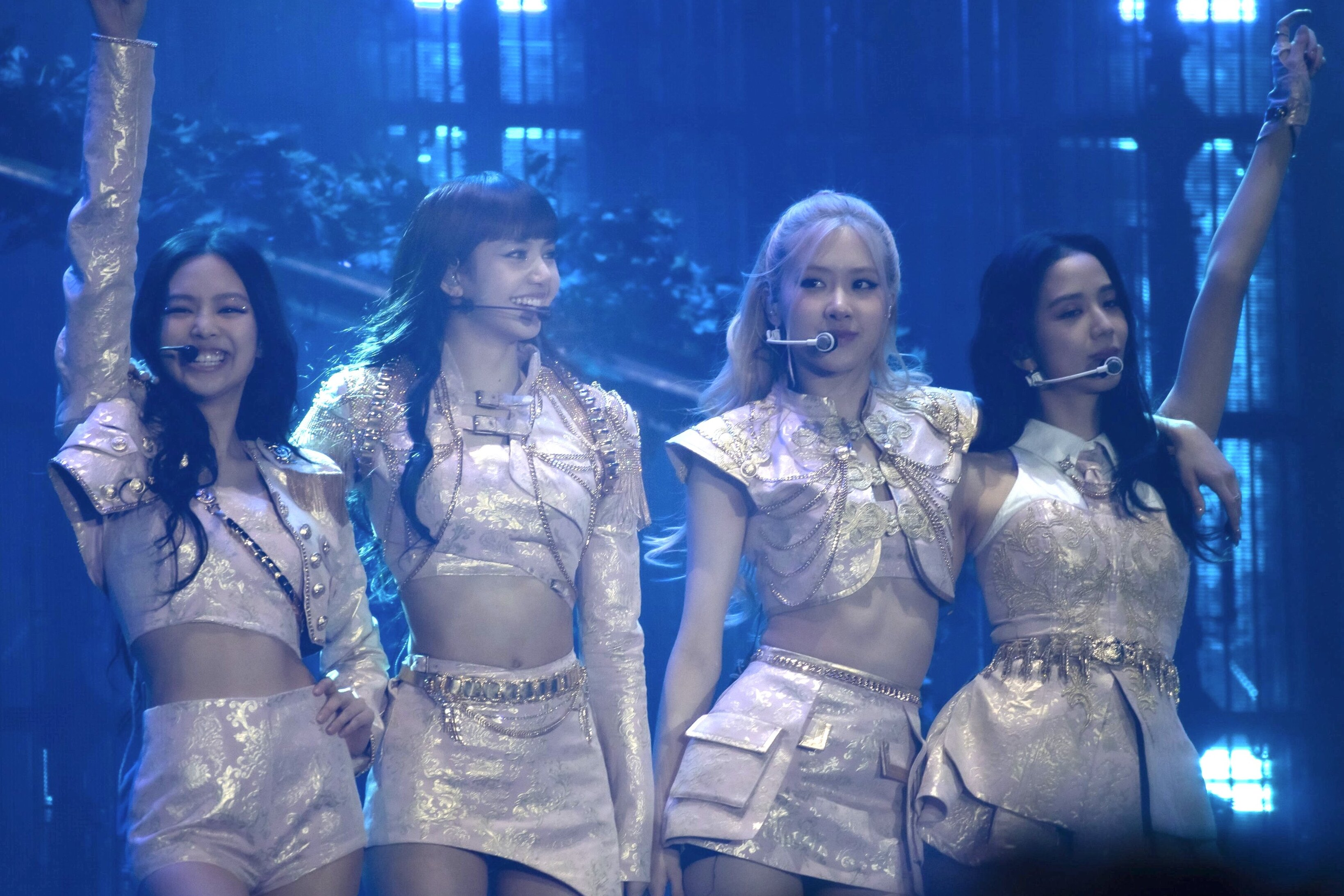
- Blackpink on the Born Pink World Tour in 2022
- Concert tours: 4
- One-off concerts: 2
- Virtual concerts: 1
- Fanmeetings: 1
- Music festivals: 14
- Award shows: 13
- TV shows and specials: 14
- Other live performances: 4

South Korean girl group Blackpink has performed in four concert tours (three of which have been worldwide), two one-day concerts and one fan meeting since their debut in August 2016. In July 2017, Blackpink held their debut Japanese showcase at the Nippon Budokan in Tokyo in front of 14,000 fans. The group's first concert tour commenced in July 2018 with their Blackpink Arena Tour, which held 8 shows throughout Japan and attracted 125,000 spectators. In November of that year, Blackpink embarked on their first worldwide concert tour, the In Your Area World Tour, which saw 36 shows in 17 countries across Asia, North America, Europe and Oceania. The tour garnered a record-breaking 472,183 attendees and became the most successful concert tour conducted by a K-pop girl group. From October 2022 to September 2023 Blackpink embarked on their second worldwide concert tour, the Born Pink World Tour, consisting of 66 concerts in 22 countries around the world. The tour attracted 1.8 million people, making it the most-attended concert tour by a K-pop girl group. It ranked at number ten on Billboard's 2023 Year End Top 40 Tours chart, and broke the record for the highest-grossing concert tour in history by a female group.

== Concert tours ==
Title	Dates	Associated album(s)	Location(s)	Shows	Gross	Attendance	Ref.
Blackpink Arena Tour 2018	July 24, 2018 – December 24, 2018	Blackpink; Blackpink in Your Area	Japan	8	—N/a	125,000	
In Your Area World Tour	November 10, 2018 – February 22, 2020	Square Up; Kill This Love	Asia; North America; Europe; Oceania	36	$56,756,285	472,183	
Born Pink World Tour	October 15, 2022 – September 17, 2023	Born Pink	Asia; North America; Europe; Oceania	66	$330,000,000	1,800,000	
Deadline World Tour	July 5, 2025 – January 26, 2026	Deadline	Asia; North America; Europe	33	TBA	TBA	

== One-off concerts ==
Title	Date	Venue	City	Setlist	Attendance	Ref.
Blackpink Japan Premium Debut Showcase	July 20, 2017	Nippon Budokan	Tokyo	"Boombayah"; "Playing With Fire"; "Whistle"; "Stay"; "As If It's Your Last"; "Boombayah" (Korean version)	14,000	
In order to promote themselves in Japan, Blackpink held their debut showcase at Nippon Budokan in front of 14,000 fans. The set list consisted of the group's previous releases being performed in Japanese as well as an encore of the Korean version of "Boombayah". The showcase was later broadcast on Japanese TV channel M-on! HD as well as the videos being included in the repackaged version of the group's debut EP Re: Blackpink which was released in early 2018.
YG Palm Stage ― 2021 Blackpink: The Show	January 31, 2021	YouTube Music	Seoul	Setlist: "Kill This Love"; "Crazy Over You"; "How You Like That"; "Dont Know What To Do"; "Playing With Fire"; "Lovesick Girls"; "Habits (Stay High)" (Jisoo cover); "Say So" (Lisa cover); "Sour Candy"; "Love To Hate Me"; "You Never Know"; "Solo" (Jennie solo); "Gone" (Rosé solo); "Pretty Savage"; "Ddu-Du Ddu-Du"; "Whistle"; "As If It's Your Last"; "Boombayah"; "Forever Young"	280,000+	
Blackpink held their first online virtual pay-per-view concert named "The Show" on January 31, 2021. It was available exclusively on Blackpink's YouTube channel and included first-time performances of songs from The Album, as well as a preview of member Rosé's "Gone" from her solo debut single R, which was later released on March 12. The livestream concert recorded approximately 280,000 paid subscribers, generating more than ₩10 billion (US$8.9 million) from ticket sales.

== Virtual concerts ==
Event	Date	App	Performed song(s)	Ref.
Blackpink: The Virtual	July 22, 2022 – July 31, 2022	PUBG Mobile	"Ddu-Du Ddu-Du"; "Kill This Love"; "How You Like That"; "Ready for Love"	

== Fanmeetings ==
Title	Date	City	Country	Venue	Ref.
2019 Private Stage [Chapter 1]	September 21, 2019 (Two shows)	Seoul	South Korea	Olympic Hall	

== Music festivals ==
Event	Date	Venue	Location	Performed song(s)	Ref.
SBS Gayo Daejeon	December 26, 2016	COEX Hall D	Seoul	"Whistle"; "Playing with Fire"	
A-Nation	August 27, 2017	Ajinomoto Stadium	Tokyo	"Boombayah"; "Playing with Fire"; "Whistle"; "As If It's Your Last"	
Daejeon SF Music Festival	September 24, 2017	Daejeon World Cup Stadium	Daejeon	"As If It's Your Last"; "Playing with Fire"	
Pyeongchang Music Festa	September 28, 2017	Phoenix Pyeongchang	Pyeongchang	"Playing with Fire"; "As If It's Your Last"; "Stay"	
Fever Festival	September 30, 2017	Seoul Plaza	Seoul	"Playing with Fire"; "As If It's Your Last"; "Whistle"; "Stay"	
Korea Music Festival	October 1, 2017	Gocheok Sky Dome	Seoul	"Playing with Fire"; "As If It's Your Last"	
Busan One Asia Festival	October 22, 2017	Asiad Main Stadium	Busan	"As If It's Your Last"; "Playing with Fire"	
SBS Gayo Daejeon	December 25, 2017	Gocheok Sky Dome	Seoul	"So Hot" (Wonder Girls cover); "As If It's Your Last"	
SBS Gayo Daejeon	December 25, 2018	Gocheok Sky Dome	Seoul	"Solo" (Jennie solo); "Ddu-Du Ddu-Du"; "Forever Young"	
Coachella	April 12, 2019 – April 19, 2019	Empire Polo Club	Indio	"Ddu-Du Ddu-Du"; "Forever Young"; "Stay"; "Whistle"; "Kiss and Make Up"; "Solo" (Jennie solo); "Kill This Love"; "Don't Know What To Do"; "Kick It"; "See U Later"; "Playing with Fire"; "Boombayah"; "As If It's Your Last"	
A-Nation	August 17, 2019	Yanmar Stadium Nagai	Osaka	"Ddu-Du Ddu-Du"; "Forever Young"; "Stay"; "Whistle"; "Kill This Love"; "Don't Know What To Do"; "Kick It"; "Boombayah"; "As If It's Your Last"	
Summer Sonic Festival	August 18, 2019	Zozo Marine Stadium	Chiba	"Ddu-Du Ddu-Du"; "Forever Young"; "Stay"; "Whistle"; "Kill This Love"; "Don't Know What To Do"; "Kick It"; "Boombayah"; "As If It's Your Last"	
Wired Music Festival	September 7, 2019	Aichi Sky Expo	Aichi	"Ddu-Du Ddu-Du"; "Forever Young"; "Stay"; "Whistle"; "Kill This Love"; "Don't Know What To Do"; "Kick It"; "Boombayah"; "As If It's Your Last"	
Coachella	April 15, 2023 – April 22, 2023	Empire Polo Club	Indio	"Pink Venom"; "Kill This Love"; "How You Like That"; "Pretty Savage"; "Kick It"; "Whistle"; "You & Me" (Jennie solo); "Flower" (Jisoo solo); "Gone" / "On the Ground" (Rosé solo); "Money" (Lisa solo); "Boombayah"; "Lovesick Girls"; "Playing with Fire"; "Typa Girl"; "Shut Down"; "Tally"; "Ddu-Du Ddu-Du"; "Forever Young"	
BST Hyde Park	July 2, 2023	Hyde Park	London	"Pink Venom"; "How You Like That"; "Pretty Savage"; "Kick It"; "Whistle"; "You & Me" / "Solo" (Jennie solo); "Flower" (Jisoo solo); "Gone" / "On the Ground" (Rosé solo); "Money" (Lisa solo); "Boombayah"; "Lovesick Girls"; "Playing with Fire"; "Typa Girl"; "Shut Down"; "Tally"; "Ddu-Du Ddu-Du"; "Forever Young"	

== Award shows ==
Event	Date	City	Performed song(s)	Ref.
1st Asia Artist Awards	November 16, 2016	Seoul	"Whistle"; "Playing with Fire"	
2016 Melon Music Awards	November 19, 2016	Seoul	"Whistle"; "Playing with Fire"	
31st Golden Disc Awards	January 13, 2017	Goyang	"Whistle"; "Playing with Fire"	
26th Seoul Music Awards	January 19, 2017	Seoul	"Playing with Fire"; "Boombayah"	
6th Gaon Chart Music Awards	February 22, 2017	Seoul	"Whistle"; "Playing with Fire"	
2017 MTV Video Music Awards Japan	September 27, 2017	Tokyo	"As If It's Your Last"; "Boombayah"	
32nd Golden Disc Awards	January 10, 2018	Goyang	"Playing with Fire"; "As If It's Your Last"	
27th Seoul Music Awards	January 25, 2018	Seoul	"As If It's Your Last"	
2018 MTV Video Music Awards Japan	October 10, 2018	Tokyo	"Ddu-Du Ddu-Du"	
2018 Melon Music Awards	December 1, 2018	Seoul	"Ddu-Du Ddu-Du"	
33rd Golden Disc Awards	January 5, 2019	Seoul	"Ddu-Du Ddu-Du"; "Forever Young"	
8th Gaon Chart Music Awards	January 23, 2019	Seoul	"Ddu-Du Ddu-Du"; "Forever Young"	
2022 MTV Video Music Awards	August 28, 2022	Newark	"Pink Venom"	

== TV shows and specials ==
Event	Date	City	Performed song(s)	Ref.
Park Jin-young's Party People	August 12, 2017	Seoul	"Whistle"; "Playing with Fire"; "Boombayah"; "Partition" (Beyoncé dance cover); "Sure Thing" (Miguel cover)	
Good Morning America	February 12, 2019	New York City	"Ddu-Du Ddu-Du"	
The Late Show with Stephen Colbert	February 12, 2019	New York City	"Ddu-Du Ddu-Du"	
Strahan & Sara	February 15, 2019	New York City	"Forever Young"	
The Late Late Show with James Corden	April 18, 2019	Los Angeles	"Kill This Love"	
Music Station	October 18, 2019	Tokyo	"Kill This Love"	
The Tonight Show Starring Jimmy Fallon	June 27, 2020	New York City	"How You Like That"	
Jimmy Kimmel Live!	October 20, 2020	Los Angeles	"Lovesick Girls"	
Good Morning America	October 21, 2020	New York City	"Lovesick Girls"	
Waktu Indonesia Belanja TV Show	November 25, 2020	Jakarta	"Lovesick Girls"	
Waktu Indonesia Belanja TV Show	January 25, 2021	Jakarta	"Pretty Savage"	
The Late Late Show with James Corden	January 27, 2021	Los Angeles	"Pretty Savage"	
Music Station	August 20, 2021	Tokyo	"Lovesick Girls"	
Jimmy Kimmel Live!	September 19, 2022	Los Angeles	"Shut Down"	
Le Gala des Pièces Jaunes	January 28, 2023	Paris	"Shut Down"; "Pink Venom"	

== Other live performances ==
Event	Date	City	Performed song(s)	Ref.
TGC Hiroshima 2017 by Tokyo Girls Collection Autumn/Winter	September 2, 2017	Hiroshima	"Boombayah"; "Playing with Fire"; "As If It's Your Last"	
Lotte Duty Free Family Concert	June 22, 2018	Seoul	"As If It's Your Last"; "Stay"; "Forever Young"	
TGC Kitakyushu 2018 by Tokyo Girls Collection	October 6, 2018	Kitakyushu	"Ddu-Du Ddu-Du"; "Forever Young"; "As If It's Your Last"	
SBS Super Concert in Suwon	October 14, 2018	Suwon	"Ddu-Du Ddu-Du"; "Forever Young"	

== See also ==
- Jisoo § Live performances
- List of Jennie live performances
- Rosé (singer) § Live performances
- Lisa (rapper) § Live performances
