= In Your Area =

In Your Area may refer to:

- In Your Area (album), a 1999 album by Hawkwind
- In Your Area World Tour, a 2018-2020 concert tour by Blackpink

== See also ==
- InYourArea
- Blackpink in Your Area
- Local news
