= Kill This Love =

- Digital and Pink version cover

EP by Blackpink
- Released: April 5, 2019
- Recorded: 2018–2019
- Genres: Pop; EDM
- Length: 16:13
- Languages: Korean; English
- Labels: YG; YG Plus; Interscope
- Producers: Teddy; Bekuh Boom; R. Tee; Lydia Paek; 24; Seo Won Jin; Brian Lee

Blackpink chronology
| Blackpink Arena Tour 2018 "Special Final In Kyocera Dome Osaka" (2019) | Kill This Love (2019) | Blackpink 2018 Tour 'In Your Area' Seoul (2019) |

Singles from Kill This Love
- 1. "Kill This Love" Released: April 4, 2019

Japanese edition album cover
- Digital and regular edition cover

Singles from Kill This Love JP Ver.
- 1. "Ddu-Du Ddu-Du (Remix JP Ver.)" Released: October 16, 2019

Kill This Love is the second Korean extended play (third overall) by South Korean girl group Blackpink. It was released on April 5, 2019, by YG Entertainment and was distributed through YG Plus and Interscope Records. It was their first Korean material since the release of Square Up in June 2018, and their first release with Interscope Records. The title track was released as the lead single; it peaked at number two in South Korea and became the first top 50 hit by a female K-pop act in the United States and the United Kingdom. The track "Don't Know What to Do" was later promoted on Korean music programs.

Kill This Love debuted at number 24 on the US Billboard 200 with 19,200 units sold including over 9,100 pure sales moved, making it the highest-charting album by a female K-pop group at the time. The EP reached the top ten in many territories, including Canada, Japan, New Zealand and South Korea, and the top twenty in Australia. It was certified platinum by the Korea Music Content Association (KMCA) in June 2019 for selling 250,000 units, becoming Blackpink's second EP to do so after Square Up, and was later certified triple platinum in July 2024 for selling 750,000 units.

== Background and release ==
The founder of YG Entertainment, Yang Hyun-suk, announced on February 8, 2019, that Blackpink was scheduled to release an EP in March. The single and EP were announced on March 25. On March 31 and April 1, multiple individual teaser pictures were posted on Blackpink's social media accounts. On July 26, it was announced that the group would release a Japanese version album of the EP through Interscope Records on September 11, 2019. The album missed its initial release date and was released on October 16, 2019. A live version of the Japanese version of "Kill This Love", recorded in the Tokyo Dome on December 4, 2019, was included in the group's third live album Blackpink 2019-2020 World Tour In Your Area – Tokyo Dome, released on May 6, 2020, through Universal Music Japan.

== Music and lyrics ==
The opening track, "Kill This Love" is a stomping, brassy electropop track with trap elements. The song contains "blaring horns and martial percussion", with Rosé and Jisoo leading the "impassioned" pre-choruses about breaking up. The second track, "Don't Know What To Do" is an EDM and pop song with throbbing bass, whistle-like hook, and an acoustic guitar. "Kick It", the third song, is a song with elements of Southern trap, synth bass, and acoustic guitar. The song is about telling past lovers: “I’m okay being alone / Don’t feel bad for me / I’m going to forget you now. The fourth track, "Hope Not", is a soft, acoustic pop-rock balladry about a break-up where the person has moved on from yearning to acceptance. The closing track, "Ddu-Du Ddu-Du (remix)" was described as a "quivering, whomping club-ready Remix".

== Singles ==
"Kill This Love" was released on April 4, 2019, as the lead single from the extended play. An accompanying music video for the song was directed by Seo Hyun-seung and uploaded onto Blackpink's YouTube channel simultaneously with the single's release. Upon release, the music video broke the record for the most views within 24 hours, accumulating 56.7 million views. Furthermore, it became the fastest video to reach 100 million views on YouTube, doing so in approximately 2 days and 14 hours, beating the record set by fellow Korean artist Psy with "Gentleman" in 2013. Commercially, the single reached the charts in 27 countries. It peaked at number two in South Korea and became the group's first top-50 hit in the United States and the United Kingdom, thus also becoming the highest-charting female K-pop song on the Billboard Hot 100 at the time.

== Critical reception ==
Professional ratings
Aggregate scores
| Source | Rating |
|---|---|
| Metacritic | 69/100 |
Review scores
| Source | Rating |
| Consequence of Sound | B |
| IZM | 2/5 stars |
| NME | 3/5 stars |
| Pitchfork | 6.2/10 |
| Rolling Stone | 3.5/5 stars |

At Metacritic, which assigns a normalized rating out of 100 to reviews from mainstream publications, the album received a weighted average score of 69 based on 4 reviews, indicating "generally favorable reviews". Laura Dzubay of Consequence of Sound said that the album "functions as a crisper, tighter, and even more badass lunge into the same ideas as last year’s album". She also noted the "balanced production styles, combined with the singers’ talents for vocal elasticity."

For Rolling Stone, Jeff Benjamin wrote that "There will be time for Blackpink to experiment—ideally in a full-length project. Until then, the women are deepening their brand of K-pop for a quickly growing, language-agnostic fanbase eagerly anticipating every fierce new beat drop." Michelle Kim from Pitchfork gave a mixed review, calling the album's production "weirdly dated, like it was crafted earlier in the decade and then forgotten in a time capsule for five years." Rhian Daly of NME said that the album "showcases a band who are certainly talented but perhaps not quite ready for the next upward arc in the ride they’re currently on." Kim Do-heon from IZM gave the EP 2 out of 5 stars, where he criticized the quality of the title track but was more favorable of the group's vocals in "Kick It" and "Hope Not".

The EP was included at number 9 on Paper's list of Top 20 Albums of 2019 while "Kick It" was included at number 20 on MTV's list of The Best K-pop B-sides of 2019.

== Awards and nominations ==
Awards and nominations for Kill This Love
| Year | Organization | Award | Result | Ref. |
|---|---|---|---|---|
| 2019 | Mnet Asian Music Awards | Album of the Year | Nominated | |
| 2020 | Gaon Chart Music Awards | Artist of the Year – Physical Album (2nd Quarter) | Nominated | |
| 2020 | Seoul Music Awards | Main Award (Bonsang) | Nominated | |

== Track listing ==
Standard version
| No. | Title | Lyrics | Music | Arrangement | Length |
|---|---|---|---|---|---|
| 1. | "Kill This Love" | Teddy; Bekuh Boom | Teddy; R. Tee; 24; Boom | Teddy; R. Tee; 24 | 3:09 |
| 2. | "Don't Know What to Do" | Teddy | Teddy; 24; Brian Lee; Boom | Teddy; R. Tee; 24 | 3:22 |
| 3. | "Kick It" | Teddy; Danny Chung; TAEO | Teddy; 24 | 24 | 3:12 |
| 4. | "Hope Not" (아니길) | Teddy; Masta Wu | Teddy; Seo Won Jin; Lydia Paek | Seo Won Jin | 3:12 |
| 5. | "Ddu-Du Ddu-Du" (뚜두뚜두, remix) | Teddy | Teddy; 24; R. Tee; Boom | R. Tee | 3:22 |
| Total length: | | | | | 16:19 |

Japanese version
| No. | Title | Lyrics | Music | Arrangement | Length |
|---|---|---|---|---|---|
| 1. | "Kill This Love" (JP Ver.) | Teddy; Bekuh Boom | Teddy; R. Tee; 24; Boom | Teddy; R. Tee; 24 | 3:09 |
| 2. | "Don't Know What to Do" (JP Ver.) | Teddy | Teddy; 24; Brian Lee; Boom | Teddy; R. Tee; 24 | 3:22 |
| 3. | "Kick It" (JP Ver.) | Teddy; Danny Chung; TAEO | Teddy; 24 | 24 | 3:12 |
| 4. | "Hope Not" (JP Ver.) | Teddy; Masta Wu | Teddy; Seo Won Jin; Lydia Paek | Seo Won Jin | 3:12 |
| 5. | "Ddu-Du Ddu-Du" (remix, JP Ver.) | Teddy | Teddy; 24; R. Tee; Boom | R. Tee | 3:22 |
| Total length: | | | | | 16:19 |

Notes

- Physical Japanese editions place the original tracks after the JP Ver. tracks.

== Charts ==
=== Weekly charts ===
Weekly chart performance for Kill This Love
| Chart (2019–20) | Peak position |
|---|---|
| Australia (ARIA) | 18 |
| Canadian Albums (Billboard) | 8 |
| Hungarian Albums (MAHASZ) | 31 |
| Irish Albums (IRMA) | 52 |
| Japanese Albums (Oricon) | 17 |
| Japanese Albums (Oricon) Japanese version | 5 |
| Japanese Hot Albums (Billboard Japan) | 6 |
| New Zealand Albums (RMNZ) | 10 |
| Scottish Albums (Official Charts) | 21 |
| South Korean Albums (Gaon) | 3 |
| Spanish Albums (PROMUSICAE) | 30 |
| Swedish Albums (Sverigetopplistan) | 23 |
| UK Albums (Official Charts) | 40 |
| US Billboard 200 | 24 |
| US Digital Albums (Billboard) | 6 |
| US Top Album Sales (Billboard) | 10 |
| US World Albums (Billboard) | 1 |

=== Monthly charts ===
Monthly chart performance for Kill This Love
| Chart (2019) | Peak position |
|---|---|
| Japanese Albums (Oricon) | 35 |
| Japanese Albums (Oricon) Japanese version | 28 |
| South Korean Albums (Gaon) | 3 |

=== Year-end charts ===
2019 year-end chart performance for Kill This Love
| Chart (2019) | Position |
|---|---|
| South Korean Albums (Gaon) | 17 |
| US World Albums (Billboard) | 14 |

2020 year-end chart performance for Kill This Love
| Chart (2020) | Position |
|---|---|
| South Korean Albums (Gaon) | 85 |
| US World Albums (Billboard) | 12 |

2021 year-end chart performance for Kill This Love
| Chart (2021) | Position |
|---|---|
| South Korean Albums (Gaon) | 89 |

== Certifications and sales ==
Certifications and sales for Kill This Love
| Region | Certification | Certified units/sales |
|---|---|---|
| Japan | — | 29,040 |
| South Korea (KMCA) | 3× Platinum | 858,271 |
| United States | — | 9,100 |

== Release history ==
Release dates and formats for Kill This Love
| Region | Date | Version | Format(s) | Label(s) | Ref. |
|---|---|---|---|---|---|
| Various | April 5, 2019 | Korean | Digital download; streaming | YG; Interscope | |
| South Korea | April 23, 2019 | Korean | CD | YG | |
| Japan | April 26, 2019 | Korean | CD | YG | |
| Japan | October 16, 2019 | Japanese | CD | Universal | |
| Various | October 16, 2019 | Japanese | Digital download; streaming | Universal | |

== See also ==
- List of certified albums in South Korea
- List of K-pop albums on the Billboard charts
