= Don't Know What to Do =

2019 song by Blackpink

Promotional single by Blackpink

from the EP Kill This Love
- Released: April 5, 2019
- Studio: The Black Label (Seoul)
- Genre: Electropop
- Length: 3:22
- Label: YG; Interscope
- Songwriters: Teddy; Brian Lee
- Producers: Teddy; R. Tee; 24; Bekuh Boom

Dance practice video
- "Don't Know What to Do" on YouTube

"Don't Know What to Do" is a song recorded by South Korean girl group Blackpink. It serves as the sub-title track from the group's second Korean extended play Kill This Love, released on April 5, 2019. It was written by Brian Lee and Teddy, who is also the producer of the song alongside 24, Bekuh Boom, and R. Tee.

Blackpink released a dance practice video for "Don't Know What to Do" and performed it on the music programs Show! Music Core and Inkigayo in South Korea. The song debuted in the national charts of several countries, entering the top five in Malaysia and the top ten on the Billboard K-pop Hot 100. It has since been certified gold by the Australian Recording Industry Association.

== Promotion ==
As the sub-title track of the EP Kill This Love, Blackpink performed "Don't Know What to Do" alongside the main title track "Kill This Love" on South Korea music programs, including Inkigayo and Show! Music Core. The group also promoted the song with performances at the Coachella in Indio, California on April 12 and 19, 2019. The song was added to the setlist of their In Your Area World Tour following its release.

== Commercial performance ==
In South Korea, the song debuted at number 121 on the Gaon Digital Chart, later peaking at 38. In Japan, it debuted at number 49 on the Japan Hot 100.

== Charts ==
=== Weekly charts ===
Chart (2019)	Peak position
Japan Hot 100 (Billboard)	49
New Zealand Hot Singles (RMNZ)	11
Malaysia (RIM)	2
South Korea (K-pop Hot 100)	9
South Korea (Gaon)	38
US World Digital Songs (Billboard)	4

=== Monthly charts ===
Chart (2019)	Peak position
South Korea (Gaon)	58

== Certifications ==
Region	Certification	Certified units/sales
Australia (ARIA)	Gold	35,000^{‡}
Brazil (Pro-Música Brasil)	Platinum	40,000^{‡}
^{‡} Sales+streaming figures based on certification alone.

== See also ==
- List of K-pop songs on the Billboard charts
