= List of Show! Music Core Chart winners (2018) =

Show! Music Core Chart winners (2018)

Highlights
- Song with most wins: "Ddu-Du Ddu-Du" by Blackpink (4)
- Artist(s) with most wins: Twice (6)
- Song with highest score: "Fake Love" by BTS (10,000)

The Show! Music Core Chart is a record chart on the South Korean MBC television music program Show! Music Core. Every week, the show awards the best-performing single on the chart in the country during its live broadcast. This is a list of 2018 winners.

== Chart history ==
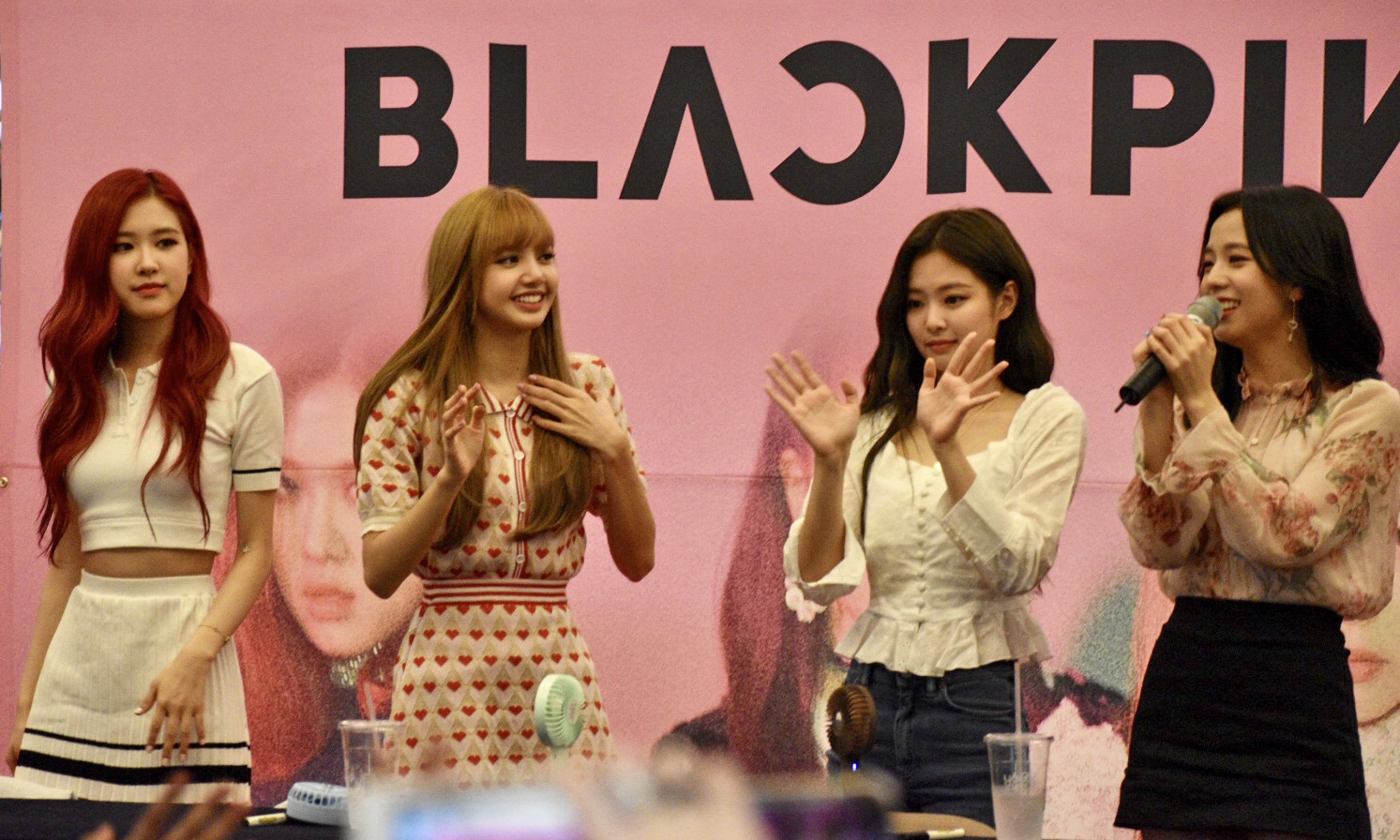
Blackpink (pictured) earned their first Show! Music Core trophy with "Ddu-Du Ddu-Du". It was also the song with the most wins on the program in 2018, winning four times.

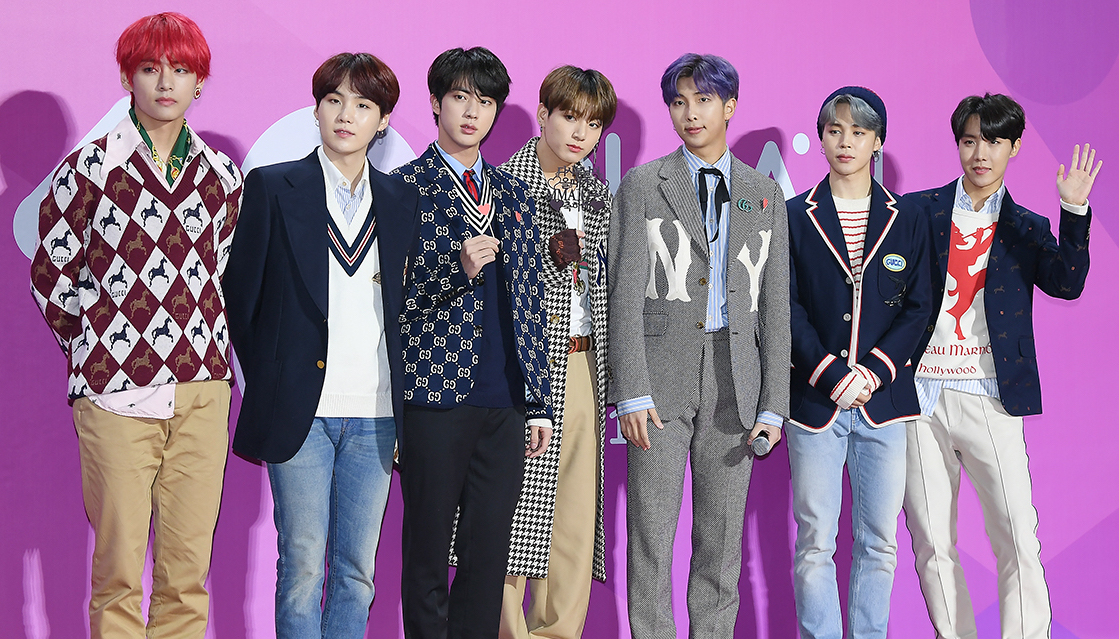
"Fake Love" by BTS (pictured) was the highest-scoring song on Show! Music Core for 2018, winning with 10,000 points on June 2.

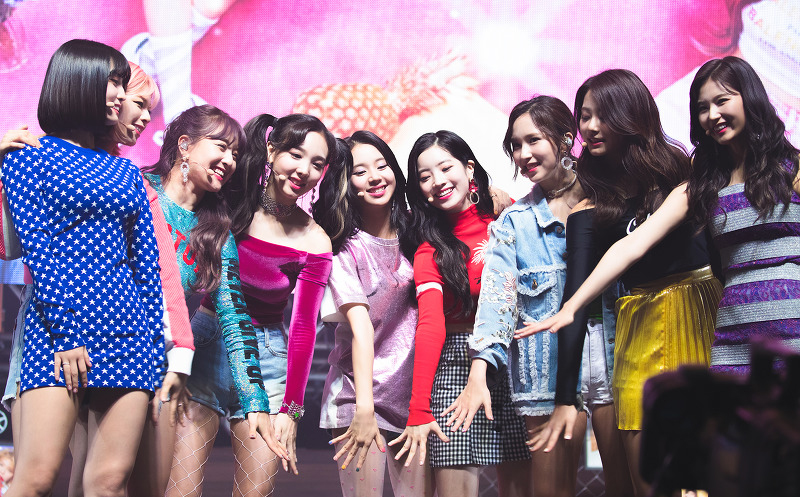
Twice (pictured) was the artist with the most wins in 2018, winning six times for "Heart Shaker", "What Is Love?", and "Dance the Night Away".

Key
| | Highest score in 2018 |
| — | No show was held |

| Episode | Date | Artist | Song | Points | Ref. |
|---|---|---|---|---|---|
| 573 | January 6 | Exo | "Universe" | 9,031 | |
| 574 | January 13 | Twice | "Heart Shaker" | 7,007 | |
| 575 | January 20 | Infinite | "Tell Me" | 6,494 | |
| 576 | January 27 | Sunmi | "Heroine" | 6,010 | |
| 577 | February 3 | Jonghyun | "Shinin'" | 7,975 | |
| —N/a | February 10 | No Show, No chart, winners were not announced | | | |
| —N/a | February 17 | No Show, No chart, winners were not announced | | | |
| 578 | February 24 | iKon | "Love Scenario" | 8,620 | |
| 579 | March 3 | iKon | "Love Scenario" | 8,551 | |
| 580 | March 10 | iKon | "Love Scenario" | 7,929 | |
| 581 | March 17 | Wanna One | "I Promise You (I.P.U.)" | 7,619 | |
| —N/a | March 24 | No Show, No chart, winners were not announced | | | |
| 582 | March 31 | Wanna One | "Boomerang" | 9,289 | |
| 583 | April 7 | Wanna One | "Boomerang" | 6,425 | |
| 584 | April 14 | Winner | "Everyday" | 9,112 | |
| 585 | April 21 | Twice | "What Is Love?" | 8,029 | |
| 586 | April 28 | Twice | "What Is Love?" | 8,934 | |
| —N/a | May 5 | No Show, No chart, winners were not announced | | | |
| 587 | May 12 | GFriend | "Time for the Moon Night" | 8,842 | |
| 588 | May 19 | GFriend | "Time for the Moon Night" | 7,872 | |
| 589 | May 26 | BTS | "Fake Love" | 8,919 | |
| 590 | June 2 | BTS | "Fake Love" | 10,000 | |
| 591 | June 9 | BTS | "Fake Love" | 8,056 | |
| 592 | June 16 | Wanna One | "Light" | 8,025 | |
| 593 | June 23 | Blackpink | "Ddu-Du Ddu-Du" | 6,071 | |
| 594 | June 30 | Blackpink | "Ddu-Du Ddu-Du" | 8,174 | |
| 595 | July 7 | Blackpink | "Ddu-Du Ddu-Du" | 7,273 | |
| 596 | July 14 | Blackpink | "Ddu-Du Ddu-Du" | 7,367 | |
| 597 | July 21 | Twice | "Dance the Night Away" | 9,792 | |
| 598 | July 28 | No Show, No chart, winners were not announced | | | |
| 599 | August 4 | Twice | "Dance the Night Away" | 7,440 | |
| 600 | August 11 | Twice | "Dance the Night Away" | 6,575 | |
| 601 | August 18 | Red Velvet | "Power Up" | 9,387 | |
| —N/a | August 25 | No Show, No chart, winners were not announced | | | |
| —N/a | September 1 | No Show, No chart, winners were not announced | | | |
| 602 | September 8 | No Chart, winners were not announced | | | |
| —N/a | September 15 | No Show, No chart, winners were not announced | | | |
| 603 | September 22 | Sunmi | "Siren" | 6,513 | |
| 604 | September 29 | Got7 | "Lullaby" | 6,123 | |
| 605 | October 6 | Im Chang-jung | "There Has Never Been a Day I Haven't Loved You" | 5,840 | |
| 606 | October 13 | iKon | "Goodbye Road" | 8,577 | |
| 607 | October 20 | IU | "Bbibbi" | 8,067 | |
| 608 | October 27 | IU | "Bbibbi" | 8,264 | |
| 609 | November 3 | IU | "Bbibbi" | 7,729 | |
| —N/a | November 10 | No Show, No chart, winners were not announced | | | |
| 610 | November 17 | No Chart, winners were not announced | | | |
| —N/a | November 24 | No Show, No chart, winners were not announced | | | |
| 611 | December 1 | Wanna One | "Spring Breeze" | 8,123 | |
| 612 | December 8 | Mino | "Fiancé" | 6,961 | |
| 613 | December 15 | Mino | "Fiancé" | 7,302 | |
| 614 | December 22 | Exo | "Love Shot" | 6,762 | |
| 615 | December 29 | No Chart, winners were not announced | | | |
