= Blackpink in Your Area =

2018 studio album / compilation album by Blackpink

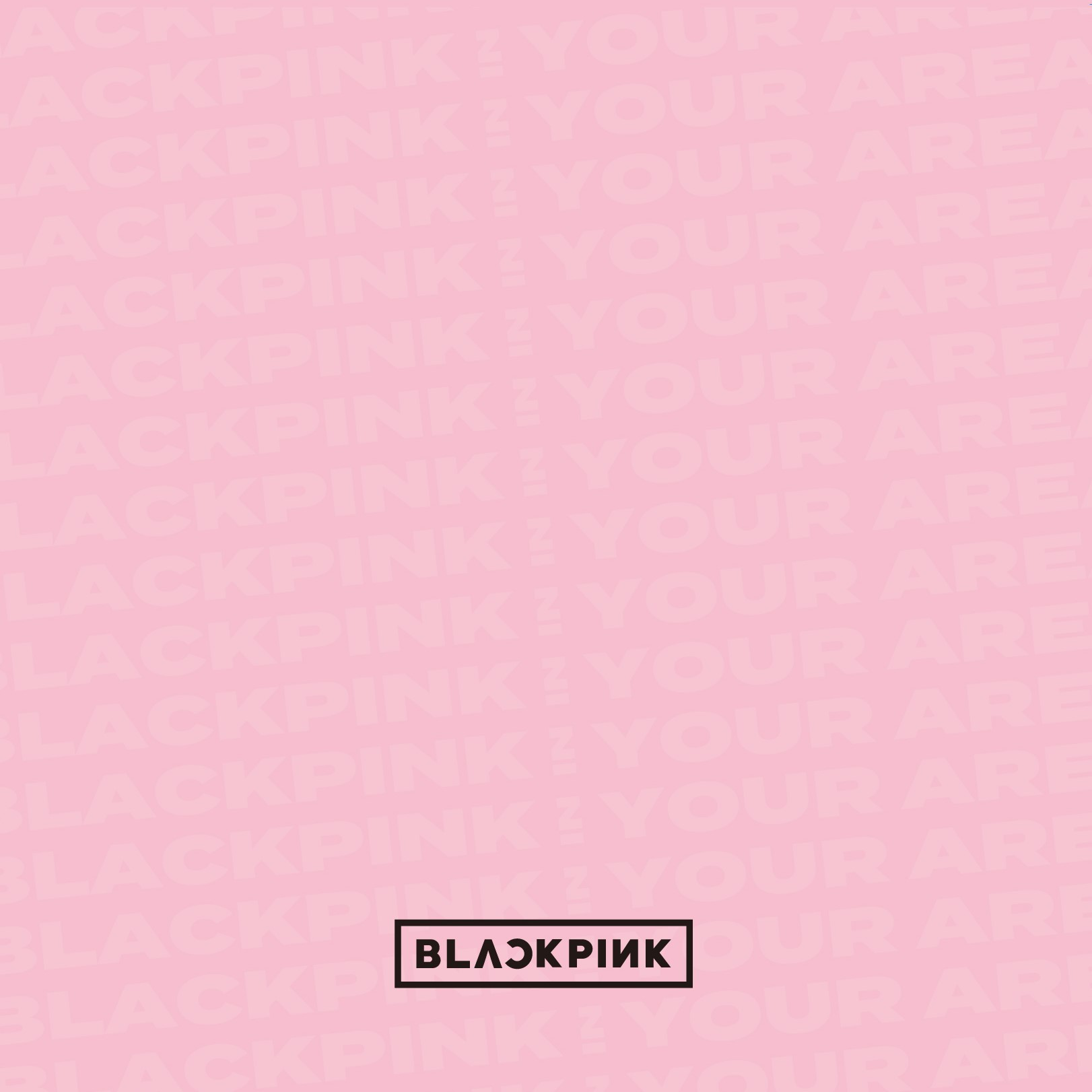
- Digital and 2CD+DVD version cover.

Compilation album by Blackpink
- Released: November 23, 2018
- Venue: Makuhari Messe
- Studios: YG, The Black Label (Seoul)
- Genre: K-pop
- Length: 32:14
- Languages: Japanese; Korean; English
- Label: YGEX
- Producer: Teddy

Blackpink chronology
Square Up (2018)	Blackpink in Your Area (2018)	Blackpink Arena Tour 2018 "Special Final In Kyocera Dome Osaka" (2019)

Singles from Blackpink in Your Area
- 1. "Ddu-Du Ddu-Du (JP Ver.)" Released: August 22, 2018

Blackpink in Your Area is the first compilation album by South Korean girl group Blackpink. The album was released through YGEX on November 23, 2018, followed by its physical release in Japan on December 5.

The album contains every song released by Blackpink up until that point, including their eponymous Japanese EP and debut Korean extended play Square Up. Digital editions of the album include only the Japanese versions of the songs (with the last three tracks being made available in this language for the first time), while the physical release is a double album featuring the Japanese versions on disc one, and the Korean versions on disc two.

== Background and release ==
On October 19, 2018, it was announced that the group would release their first Japanese compilation album. It was also revealed that the album would be released in 12 versions on December 5. On November 13, it was reported that the group had partnered with Shiseido for the release of their album. It was also revealed that the album will include the Japanese versions of "Forever Young", "Really", and "See U Later" previously released on the group's debut Korean extended play, Square Up (2018).

On November 22, it was revealed that the album would be released on digital stores on November 23, containing the nine Japanese versions from the group's singles.

The album was released digitally on November 23, 2018.

== Commercial performance ==
The album debuted at number 8 on the Oricon Albums Chart in its first day and peaked at number 7 in its second day. In its third day the album dropped to number 11 and to number 17 in its fourth day, and rose to number 10 in its fifth day, dropping to number 16 in its sixth day.

The album debuted at number 9 on the Oricon Albums Chart in its first week with 13,878 physical copies sold and dropped to number 30 in its second week with 3,044 additional copies sold. The album debuted at number 91 on Billboard Japan's Top Download Albums staying for two weeks, before peaking at number 77 in its third week. It also debuted at number 12 on Billboard Japan's Hot Albums, placing at number 9 on Top Albums Sales with 14,710 copies combined sold.

== Track listing ==
Credits adapted from liner notes of Blackpink in Your Area. All songs are Japanese version unless specified.

Blackpink in Your Area track listing
No.	Title	Lyrics	Music	Arrangement	Length
1.	"Boombayah"	Teddy; Bekuh Boom; Sunny Boy	Teddy; Boom	Teddy	4:01
2.	"Whistle"	Teddy; Boom; B.I; Sunny Boy	Teddy; Future Bounce; Boom	Teddy; Future Bounce	3:31
3.	"Playing with Fire"	Teddy; Emyli	Teddy; R. Tee	R. Tee	3:15
4.	"Stay"	Teddy; Emyli	Teddy; Seo Wonjin	Teddy; Seo Wonjin	3:50
5.	"As If It's Your Last"	Teddy; Brother Su; Choice37; Sunny Boy	Teddy; Future Bounce; Lydia Paek	Teddy; Future Bounce	3:32
6.	"Ddu-Du Ddu-Du"	Teddy; Sunny Boy	Teddy; 24; R. Tee; Boom	Teddy; 24; R. Tee	3:29
7.	"Forever Young"	Teddy; Emyli; ZERO	Teddy; Future Bounce	Teddy; Future Bounce; R. Tee	3:57
8.	"Really"	Teddy; Danny Chung	Teddy; Choice37	Choice37	3:17
9.	"See U Later"	Teddy; Sunny Boy	Teddy; R. Tee; 24	R. Tee; 24	3:19
Total length:					32:14

Blackpink in Your Area –2CD+DVD edition Bonus CD tracks
No.	Title	Lyrics	Music	Arrangement	Length
1.	"Boombayah" (Korean version)	Teddy; Boom	Teddy; Boom	Teddy	4:01
2.	"Whistle" (Korean version)	Teddy; Boom; B.I	Teddy; Future Bounce; Boom	Teddy; Future Bounce	3:31
3.	"Playing with Fire" (Korean version)	Teddy	Teddy; R. Tee	R. Tee	3:17
4.	"Stay" (Korean version)	Teddy	Teddy; Seo Wonjin	Teddy; Seo Wonjin	3:50
5.	"As If It's Your Last" (Korean version)	Teddy; Brother Su; Choice37	Teddy; Future Bounce; Lydia Paek	Teddy; Future Bounce	3:33
6.	"Ddu-Du Ddu-Du" (Korean version)	Teddy	Teddy; 24; R. Tee; Boom	Teddy; 24; R. Tee	3:29
7.	"Forever Young" (Korean version)	Teddy	Teddy; Future Bounce	Teddy; Future Bounce; R. Tee	3:57
8.	"Really" (Korean version)	Teddy; Danny Chung	Teddy; Choice37	Choice37	3:17
9.	"See U Later" (Korean version)	Teddy	Teddy; R. Tee; 24	R. Tee; 24	3:18
Total length:					32:13

DVD: Videos
No.	Title	Length
1.	"Boombayah" (music video)
2.	"Whistle" (music video)
3.	"Playing with Fire" (music video)
4.	"Stay" (music video)
5.	"As If It's Your Last" (music video)
6.	"Ddu-Du Ddu-Du" (music video)

DVD: Live section
No.	Title	Length
1.	"Ddu-Du Ddu-Du" (Blackpink Arena Tour 2018)
2.	"Forever Young" (Blackpink Arena Tour 2018; Korean version)
3.	"Whistle" (Blackpink Arena Tour 2018; acoustic version)
4.	"Stay" (Blackpink Arena Tour 2018)
5.	"See U Later" (Blackpink Arena Tour 2018; Korean version)
6.	"Really" (Blackpink Arena Tour 2018; Korean version)
7.	"Playing with Fire" (Blackpink Arena Tour 2018)
8.	"Boombayah" (Blackpink Arena Tour 2018)
9.	"As If It's Your Last" (Blackpink Arena Tour 2018)

== Charts ==
Chart performance for Blackpink in Your Area
Chart (2018)	Peak position
Japanese Albums (Oricon)	9
Japan Hot Albums (Billboard)	12

== Certifications and sales ==
Certifications and sales for Blackpink in Your Area
Region	Certification	Certified units/sales
Japan	—	22,464

== Release history ==
Release dates and formats for Blackpink in Your Area
Region	Date	Format	Label	Ref.
Various	November 23, 2018	Digital download; streaming	YGEX	
Japan	December 5, 2018	CD; CD+DVD; CD+Photobook; 2CD+DVD; Playbutton	YGEX	
