= Ddu-Du Ddu-Du =

- Japanese CD+DVD and digital cover

Single by Blackpink

from the EP Square Up
- Language: Korean; English
- Released: June 15, 2018
- Genre: Pop rap; EDM trap
- Length: 3:31
- Label: YG
- Songwriter: Teddy Park
- Producers: Teddy Park; 24; Bekuh Boom; R. Tee

Blackpink singles chronology
"As If It's Your Last" (2017)	"Ddu-Du Ddu-Du" (2018)	"Kill This Love" (2019)

Music video
- "Ddu-Du Ddu-Du" on YouTube "Ddu-Du Ddu-Du (JP Ver.)" on YouTube

"Ddu-Du Ddu-Du" (Korean: 뚜두뚜두; RR: Ttuduttudu) is a song by South Korean girl group Blackpink, recorded for their first Korean extended play, Square Up (2018). The song was written by YG collaborator Teddy Park, while production and composition were handled by Teddy, 24, Bekuh Boom, and R. Tee. It was released as the extended play's lead single to digital outlets on June 15, 2018. The Japanese version of the single was released through YGEX on August 22, 2018, and was distributed in three physical formats. A trap and pop rap song infused with bubblegum pop and EDM sounds, it uses oriental percussion rhythms and whistling while the title imitates the sound of a gunshot. Its lyrics contain messages of strength and self-assurance.

"Ddu-Du Ddu-Du" drew generally favorable reviews that complimented its production and the group's performance. It was named the Song of the Year in a public survey conducted by Gallup Korea in 2018, and appeared on Melon and Rolling Stone's lists of the best Korean pop songs of all time. It was the top song on the South Korean Gaon Digital Chart for three weeks, Blackpink's second number-one single in the country. It reached number one in Singapore and Malaysia and on the Billboard K-pop Hot 100 and World Digital Songs charts. The song peaked at number 55 on the US Billboard Hot 100 and became the first song by a K-pop girl group to enter the UK Singles Chart. It was certified double platinum for streaming and platinum for digital sales in South Korea, platinum in France, Japan and New Zealand, gold in the United States, and silver in the United Kingdom.

An accompanying music video features the group members in high-end looks on pink-and-black-hued sets. It became the most-viewed online video by a Korean act within a day of its release, the second-most-watched music video of all time within two days. It is the first music video by a K-pop group to reach two billion views, and remains the most-viewed music video by a K-pop group on YouTube to date. Blackpink promoted "Ddu-Du Ddu-Du" with appearances on the music programs Show! Music Core and Inkigayo in South Korea. The song's "finger gun" choreography became a dance move. The group sang the song during their three concert tours, at California's Coachella festival, and the BST Hyde Park festival in London.

== Background and release ==
On June 4, 2018, YG Entertainment confirmed via YG Life that Blackpink would release their debut Korean-language extended play (EP), Square Up, on June 15, with "Ddu-Du Ddu-Du" serving as its lead single. It was the group's first original release in a year since "As If It's Your Last" in June 2017. The odd name was said to be reminiscent of an onomatopoeia. Blackpink were quoted as saying, "As it is our debut EP and comeback after one year, we prepared each song with a lot of sincerity and affection." Member Jennie said, "I am confident and I look forward to our comeback. I am happy to be able to express the musicality of Blackpink in various ways."

"Ddu-Du Ddu-Du" was released via digital download and streaming on June 15, 2018, in conjunction with the release of Square Up. It was written and produced by Teddy Park and co-produced by Park, Bekuh Boom, 24, and R. Tee. On August 17, YGEX announced that a Japanese version of the track would be released as the group's debut single in Japan on August 22, 2018. The release featured additional lyrics by Sunny Boy. It was subsequently distributed in three physical formats: a CD-only regular edition, a limited edition CD+DVD, and a CD member edition. The regular and limited editions include all the tracks from Square Up, in addition to the Japanese version of the single. The limited edition DVD contains behind the scenes footage from the music video as well as a dance practice video. The member edition was packaged as a four-version CD single—one version for each member, and contains only the original version of the track. On April 5, 2019, a remix of "Ddu-Du Ddu-Du" was included as an album track on Blackpink's second Korean extended play, Kill This Love.

== Composition and lyrics ==
"Ddu-Du Ddu-Du"
A sample of the track, showcasing its EDM trap production with instrumentations of oriental percussion rhythms. The song's title resembles that of a gunshot.

Music journalists have characterized "Ddu-Du Ddu-Du" as a "fierce" pop-rap track that "features a prominent trap beat" infused with bubblegum pop sounds. It combines instrumentations of oriental percussion rhythms and whistling with a trap production. Park Bo-ram from Yonhap News Agency described the single's production as primarily hip-hop laced with "aggressive trap" beats, while Im Eun-byel from The Korea Herald noted how the song's title resembled the sound of a gunshot, but also likened it to that of "a spell". Jennie commented how the group reacted when they heard the demo for the song: "When we first listened to the lead track 'Ddu-Du Ddu-Du,' we all thought, 'This is it.'"

"Ddu-Du Ddu-Du" incorporates the use of trap synths, which is repeated multiple times throughout the first verse. Music producer Azodi commented that its "biggest riff" is already heard in the beginning, "but keeps a lot of space in the verses and chorus for a strong lead vocal line". Its production makes use of percolating synthesizers, while the chorus sees the group members delivering the refrain: "hit you with that 'ddu-du ddu-du'". Azodi observed that, "By the time the chorus is here, you would've heard the hook about four to eight times roughly so it's already been passively drilled into your skull without you realizing". The lyrical content, such as "In my hands is a fat check/ If you're curious, do a fact check", celebrate the members' success. In the Japanese rendition, the new English rap verses feature Lisa making references to the character Patrick Star from SpongeBob SquarePants ("Bitch, I’m a star, but no Patrick") and rapper Ice-T ("Like Ice-T, I'm OG"). Jennie’s rap highlights the group's cover of GQ Japan; they were the first female group to have a solo cover shoot ("All my GQ's spread like hummus").

== Critical reception ==
"Ddu-Du Ddu-Du" was met with generally favorable reviews from music critics. Hwang Seon-up, a critic from South Korean webzine IZM, awarded the song a 3.5 out of 5; he noted the unexpected blend of an "ordinary trap beat" with synth instrumentals, which he felt created an "outstanding" climax in the "Ddu-Du Ddu-Du" drop. Chase McMullen, writing for The 405, described the song as both "boisterous" and "beautifully ludicrous", and regarded the chorus to be "essentially nonsense". He emphasized that "what's being said [is] less important than how they say it", and praised the song for its "irresistible cadences" and a seamless flow of verses. Jeff Benjamin, for Paper, commended the song's musical arrangement and placed it at number 13 on their Top 20 K-Pop Songs of 2018 list, remarking that the song perfectly blended "hard hip-hop, honeyed harmonies", and a touch of hazy EDM. Furthermore, Benjamin added, "From the opening shoutout of their group name, Blackpink delivers one of the year's strongest anthems."

Writing for NME, Rhian Daly ranked "Ddu-Du Ddu-Du" the best song in the group's discography in May 2019, writing, "It's a no-holds-barred, powerful anthem packed full of supreme self-confidence and swagger." She ranked it the 26th best K-pop song of all time in a piece published by The Forty-Five in May 2023, remarking that it is rare for K-pop intros to be as recognizable as entrance of "Ddu-Du Ddu-Du", and complimented the "perfect combination of rap braggadocio from Jennie and Lisa and powerhouse vocals from Rosé and Jisoo". Taylor Glasby from British GQ felt the song embodied the essence of "over the top" K-pop, highlighting the "hooky title refrain", the rappers' sly confidence in the verses, and the emotional build into the chorus that gave the members space to demonstrate their vocal ability. On the other hand, Business Insider's Palmer Haasch was not impressed with the song's production, opining that despite its "dramatic" flair and overflowing confidence, the track lacked the "thematic substance" found in songs like "Kill This Love", even though it followed a similar structure. She further noted that the "bridge and final bars don't feel like a particularly satisfying conclusion".

"Ddu-Du Ddu-Du" on select listicles
Critic/Publication	Year	List	Rank	Ref.
British GQ	2019	Best K-Pop songs of the decade	No order	
The Forty-Five	2023	The 45 best K-pop songs of all-time	26	
Gallup Korea	2024	10 Most Beloved K-pop Songs of the 21st Century	5	
Melon	2021	Top 100 K-pop Songs of All Time	13	
The New York Times	2018	The 65 Best Songs of 2018	31	
Paper	2018	Top 20 K-pop Songs of 2018	13	
Rolling Stone	2018	10 Best Music Videos of 2018	8	
Rolling Stone	2023	100 Greatest Songs in the History of Korean Pop Music	6	
Rolling Stone	2025	The 250 Greatest Songs of the 21st Century So Far	142	

== Accolades ==
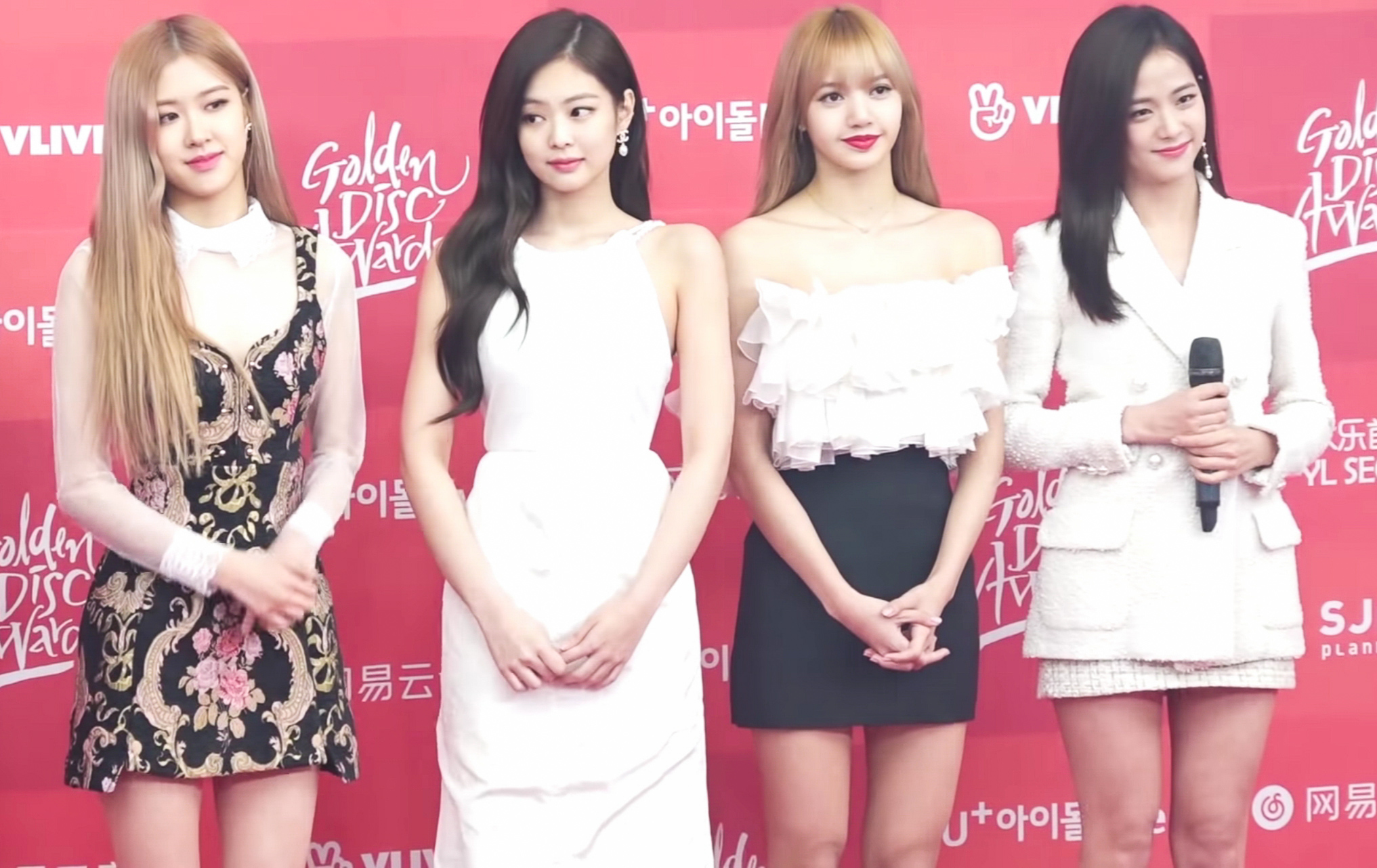
Blackpink at the 33rd Golden Disc Awards, where they won Digital Bonsang for "Ddu-Du Ddu-Du".

"Ddu-Du Ddu-Du" won 11 first place awards on South Korean music programs, including a quadruple crown on Show! Music Core and triple crowns on Inkigayo and M Countdown. It additionally won three weekly Melon Popularity Awards from July 2 to July 16, 2018.

Awards and nominations for "Ddu-Du Ddu-Du"
Year	Organization	Award	Result	Ref.
2018	BreakTudo Awards	Video of the Year	Nominated	
2018	Genie Music Awards	Best Female Dance Performance	Nominated	
2018	Genie Music Awards	Song of the Year	Nominated	
2018	Korea Popular Music Awards	Best Group Dance	Nominated	
2018	Korea Popular Music Awards	Song of the Year	Nominated	
2018	Melon Music Awards	Best Dance – Female	Won	
2018	Melon Music Awards	Song of the Year	Nominated	
2018	Mnet Asian Music Awards	Song of the Year	Nominated	
2018	Mnet Asian Music Awards	Best Dance Performance Female Group	Nominated	
2018	Mnet Asian Music Awards	Best Music Video	Nominated	
2018	MTV Video Music Awards Japan	Best Dance Video	Won	
2019	Gaon Chart Music Awards	Artist of the Year – Digital Music (June)	Won	
2019	Golden Disc Awards	Best Digital Song (Bonsang)	Won	
2019	Golden Disc Awards	Song of the Year (Daesang)	Nominated	
2019	Teen Choice Awards	Choice Song: Group	Won	
2020	Bugs Music Awards	20th Anniversary – Most Loved Music	Won	

Music program awards
Program	Date	Ref.
Show! Music Core	June 23, 2018	
Show! Music Core	June 30, 2018	
Show! Music Core	July 7, 2018	
Show! Music Core	July 14, 2018	
Inkigayo	June 24, 2018	
Inkigayo	July 1, 2018	
Inkigayo	July 8, 2018	
M Countdown	June 28, 2018	
M Countdown	July 5, 2018	
M Countdown	July 12, 2018	
Music Bank	June 29, 2018	

== Commercial performance ==
In South Korea, "Ddu-Du Ddu-Du" debuted at number three on the Gaon Digital Chart for the week of June 16. The following week, the song ascended to the number one position and scored the highest weekly points in the Gaon Digital Chart. "Ddu-Du Ddu-Du" also achieved a perfect all-kill upon its release, retaining the status for eleven consecutive days. The song remained atop the Gaon Digital Chart for three weeks and subsequently spent over 50 weeks in the top 100. It was then certified platinum twice by the Korea Music Content Association (KMCA) for accumulating 100 million streams on November 8, 2018, and 2.5 million digital downloads on April 11, 2019. Elsewhere in Asia, the song peaked at number one on the digital streaming record charts in Malaysia and Singapore. The Japanese version of the single debuted at number six on the Japanese Oricon Daily Singles Chart and peaked at number two six days later, selling 3,725 units. On the chart's weekly issue, the song debuted at number seven with 24,385 physical copies sold. The song was certified platinum in Japan for 100 million streams by the Recording Industry Association of Japan (RIAJ) in January 2024.

In the United States, "Ddu-Du Ddu-Du" debuted and peaked at number 55 on the US Billboard Hot 100 on June 30, 2018. It became the highest-charting song by a Korean girl group on the chart, breaking the record previously held by "Nobody" by Wonder Girls in 2009. Within its first week, the song accumulated 12.4 million streams and sold more than 7,000 digital units in the country. According to Nielsen, the song received 113 million on-demand streams in 2018. On August 23, 2019, the song was certified gold by the Recording Industry Association of America (RIAA), for track equivalent sales of 500,000 units in the US, making Blackpink the first Korean girl group and third Korean artist overall to receive the certification, after Psy and BTS. In Canada, "Ddu-Du Ddu-Du" debuted at number 22 on the Canadian Hot 100 and remained on the chart for ten weeks. In Europe, the song peaked at number 32 on the Scottish Singles and Albums Charts and number 78 on the UK Singles Chart, making Blackpink the first K-pop girl group in history to enter the chart. The track reached 45.5 million streams in the United Kingdom as of September 2022, becoming the group's most-streamed song in the country. In June 2021, the song was awarded a silver certification in the country by the British Phonographic Industry (BPI) for track-equivalent sales of 200,000 units.

== Music video ==
A scene in the music video where Jennie raps while sitting on a diamond-encrusted T-34-85 tank.

The music video for "Ddu-Du Ddu-Du" was uploaded to the group's official YouTube channel along with the release of Square Up on June 15. It soon became the most viewed online video in the first 24 hours by a Korean act, and the second most watched music video of all time with more than 36.2 million views within 24 hours after release, surpassing Psy's "Gentleman" (2013) and second only to Taylor Swift's "Look What You Made Me Do" (2017). The music video hit 100 million views in 10 days, making "Ddu-Du Ddu-Du" the only music video by an all-female K-pop group to achieve the feat within the timeframe. In November 2018, five months after release, it became the fastest music video by a K-pop group to reach 500 million views and the fifth most viewed K-pop video of all time. A dance practice video for the song was released on June 18, 2018.

The track's music video primarily focuses on the choreography and features the group in high-end looks amid pink-and-black-hued sets. It depicts the group members with a variety of props and attires; Jennie appears as a queen on a chessboard and is seen sitting atop a diamond-encrusted tank with shopping bags. Lisa disperses a burst of smoke resembling a pair of wings, before she is seen with a pink cockatoo and a katana. Rosé looks up towards another version of herself on a pedestal dressed in glimmering gown, while at one point, she is seen swinging on a chandelier. Jisoo appears sporting a pink wig while standing in front of a mural depicting herself, and is surrounded by a crowd of masked men all capturing the mural with their mobile phones. She initially stands unnoticed due to the wig she is wearing, however, the crowd begins to take notice and record her every move after she stumbles and falls while walking. Explaining the concept behind the scene, Jisoo elaborated: "The message is about how people can go crazy about the celebrity figures and how they will aim at the celebrities if they make mistakes. We wanted to portray a scene which is interesting and meaningful to us."

Writing for the July 2018 issue of Seoul Magazine, Kristina Manente expressed appreciation for the song's blend of traditional Korean instrumentals with the beat and bass of hip-hop, describing it as an "auditory delight". Manente wrote that the fusion was reflected in the music video through its integration of elements from Korean architecture, and observed a recurring trend in South Korean music videos where traditional and contemporary elements are blended together, in which she thought contributed to their unique charm. Rolling Stone named it the eighth best music video of 2018, describing it as "a feat of bonkers, maximalist creativity that includes the best use of a tank in a music video since Master P's "Make 'Em Say Uhh!" in 1998. Blackpink later revealed that the "gun-shooting hand gesture", featured during the chorus in the music video, was not included in the initial choreography; Jennie explained that the original move involved the members extending their arms, with palms facing downwards, while swaying their hands from side to side. The group altered the dance move to the gun-shooting gesture on the day of the music video shoot.

In October 2018, "Ddu-Du Ddu-Du" won Best Dance Video at the 2018 MTV Video Music Awards Japan. YouTube Rewind named it the second most popular music video in South Korea during 2018, only behind "Love Scenario" by label-mate iKon. On January 21, 2019, the video became the most-viewed music video by a K-pop group on YouTube, with 620.9 million views; the video averaged 2.5 million views per day since its release, with 1.95 million daily views in January 2019. On November 11, 2019, the music video surpassed one billion views, making Blackpink the first K-pop group, second girl group, and fourth music group overall to achieve the milestone. The video subsequently surpassed two billion views on January 4, 2023, making it the first K-pop group video to achieve the milestone, after "Gangnam Style" (2012) by Psy.

== Live performances and other usage ==
As part of promotions for Square Up, Blackpink premiered the song on live television along with "Forever Young" on Show! Music Core on June 16, 2018. Osen contrasted the "refreshing and melodic" performance of "Forever Young" with the strong hip-hop concept of "Ddu-Du Ddu-Du". They subsequently appeared on Inkigayo for the first time to perform the song the next day. On June 22, the group was slated to perform the track at the Lotte Duty Free Family Concert 2018; however after several songs, their performance was abruptly halted before having a chance to perform "Ddu-Du Ddu-Du" due to safety concerns. Fans expressed discontent regarding the handling of the situation as many in the audience paid tickets to see the group and they did not return after being escorted off the stage. The event organizers soon apologized for the incident.

"Ddu-Du Ddu-Du" was used as the opening number for the group's first two headlining concert tours, the Blackpink Arena Tour 2018 and the In Your Area World Tour (2018–2020). They also performed the song at the TGC Kitakyushu 2018 festival by Tokyo Girls Collection in Japan on October 6, and the SBS Super Concert in Suwon on October 14. At year-end award ceremonies and festivals, Blackpink performed the song live at the 2018 Melon Music Awards on December 1, where they won the award for best female dance performance. On December 25, Jennie performed her single "Solo" at the annual SBS Gayo Daejeon, before reuniting with the rest of the members for the performance of "Ddu-Du Ddu-Du" and "Forever Young". The following month, the group made performances with the song at the 33rd Golden Disc Awards on January 5, 2019, and the 8th Gaon Chart Music Awards on January 23.

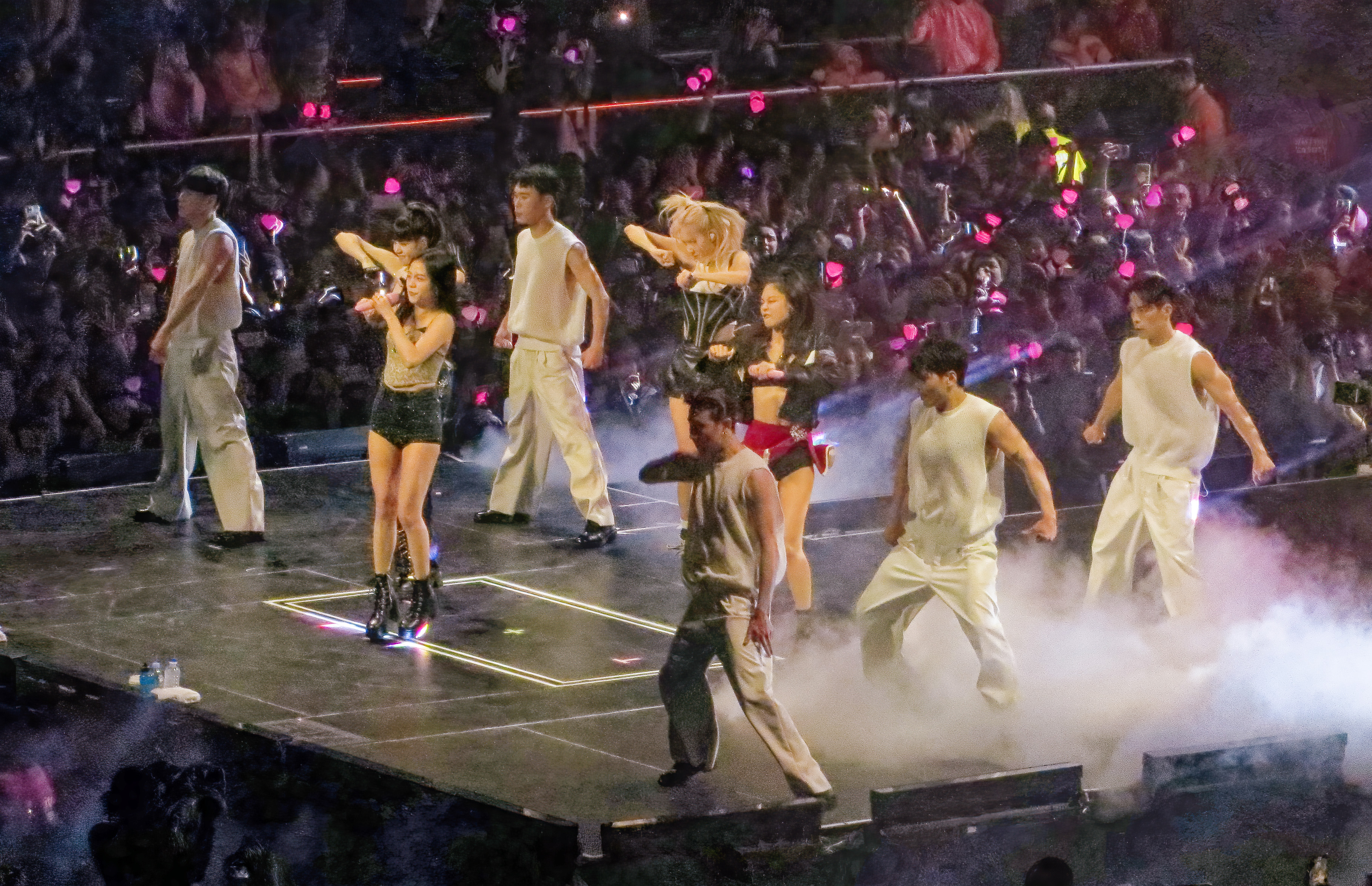
Blackpink performing the song during the Born Pink World Tour in London, 2022

On February 9, 2019, the group performed in the United States for the first time at Universal Music's Grammy Artist Showcase with "Ddu-Du Ddu-Du" and "Forever Young". Two days later, Blackpink made their American television debut in New York City on The Late Show with Stephen Colbert; their performance on the show coincided with the 55th anniversary of the Beatles' American television debut at the same theater. They also made a performance with the song on Good Morning America the following day. At the April 2019 Coachella Festival in Indio, California, "Ddu-Du Ddu-Du" was also used for Blackpink's opening performance. On January 31, 2021, the group performed the song as part of their set list for their virtual concert The Show; the stage was decorated with a display of fire and pyrotechnics and was transformed into a shallow pool. Maddy Myer from Teen Vogue wrote that the performance was "one of the greatest spectacles of the concert". Matthew Mohan-Hickson from Billboard noted how "the fire and water elements shine" and deemed it one of the concert's standout moments. "Ddu-Du Ddu-Du" was also included in the set list for the group's second world tour, the Born Pink World Tour (2022–2023).

In 2018, "Ddu-Du Ddu-Du" was added to the soundtrack of the dance rhythm game Just Dance 2019. The song was featured in the fourth episode of season three of Freeform series The Bold Type in April 2019, and the fifth episode of the tvN television series Mr. Queen in December 2020. South Korean boy band Stray Kids performed "God's Ddu-Du Ddu-Du", a Deadpool-themed mashup of "Ddu-Du Ddu-Du" with their own song "God's Menu", during the 2021 Mnet competition show Kingdom: Legendary War. In November 2023, members of the British royal band performed a cover of "Ddu-Du-Ddu-Du" at the gates of London's Buckingham Palace in recognition of the group members receiving honorary MBEs from King Charles III.

== Impact and legacy ==
"Ddu-Du Ddu-Du" was named the Song of the Year in the 2018 edition of the annual public survey conducted by South Korean research company Gallup Korea.The Korea Herald reported that the "gun-shooting hand gesture" helped make "Ddu-Du Ddu-Du" the most-covered K-pop song in 2018. In December 2019, British GQ named it among the best K-pop songs of the 2010s and the highlight work of the genre from 2018. Lucy Ford, from the same publication, said the song helped Blackpink cement "the badass, empowered 'girl crush' concept" initially propelled by 2NE1. Writing for Sisa Journal, music critic Kim Young-dae wrote that the song and choreography underscored Blackpink's "sophisticated and edgy image" among girl groups.

In 2021, a panel of 35 music experts curated by Melon and newspaper Seoul Shinmun ranked "Ddu-Du Ddu-Du" 13th in the top 100 K-pop songs. KBS Radio director Soyeon Kang wrote that the song, characterized by its EDM trap beats and strong hooks, established Blackpink's musical identity and helped the group capture worldwide attention and break record. In 2023, Rolling Stone ranked it sixth among Korean pop songs, saying it helped perfect K-pop's "EDM trap template" and elevate it to "global heights".

== Track listing ==
CD member editions – Japanese version
No.	Title	Lyrics	Music	Arrangement	Length
1.	"Ddu-Du Ddu-Du"	Teddy; Sunny Boy; Bekuh Boom	Teddy; 24; R. Tee; Bekuh Boom	Teddy; 24; R. Tee	3:29
Total length:					3:29

CD single / CD+DVD – Japanese version
No.	Title	Lyrics	Music	Arrangement	Length
1.	"Ddu-Du Ddu-Du"	Teddy; Sunny Boy; Bekuh Boom	Teddy; 24; R. Tee; Bekuh Boom	Teddy; 24; R. Tee	3:29
2.	"Ddu-Du Ddu-Du" (뚜두뚜두; Korean version)	Teddy	Teddy; 24; R. Tee; Bekuh Boom	Teddy; 24; R. Tee	3:31
3.	"Forever Young" (Korean version)	Teddy	Teddy; Future Bounce	Teddy; Future Bounce; R. Tee	3:57
4.	"Really" (Korean version)	Teddy; Danny Chung	Teddy; Choice37	Choice37	3:17
5.	"See U Later" (Korean version)	Teddy	Teddy; R. Tee; 24	R. Tee; 24	3:18
Total length:					14:03

Limited edition DVD – Japanese version
No.	Title	Length
1.	"Ddu-Du Ddu-Du" (music video)	3:34
2.	"Ddu-Du Ddu-Du" (behind the scenes)	3:47
3.	"Ddu-Du Ddu-Du" (dance practice video)	3:35
Total length:		10:56

== Charts ==
=== Weekly charts ===
Weekly chart performance for "Ddu-Du Ddu-Du"
Chart (2018–2023)	Peak position
Canada Hot 100 (Billboard)	22
France Download (SNEP)	95
Global 200 (Billboard)	158
Greece International (IFPI)	91
Hong Kong (HKRIA)	2
Japan (Oricon)	7
Japan Hot 100 (Billboard)	7
Malaysia (RIM)	1
Netherlands (Global Top 40)	28
New Zealand Heatseekers (RMNZ)	2
Russia (Tophit)	43
Scottish Singles Sales (Official Charts)	32
Singapore (RIAS)	1
South Korea (Gaon)	1
South Korea (K-pop Hot 100)	1
Taiwan (Billboard)	12
UK Singles (Official Charts)	78
UK Independent (Official Charts)	16
US Billboard Hot 100	55
US World Digital Songs (Billboard)	1
Vietnam Hot 100 (Billboard)	41

"Ddu-Du Ddu-Du" (remix version)
Chart (2019)	Peak position
South Korea Download (Gaon)	100

=== Monthly charts ===
Monthly chart performance for "Ddu-Du Ddu-Du"
Chart (2018)	Peak position
South Korea (Gaon)	1

=== Year-end charts ===
2018 year-end chart performance for "Ddu-Du Ddu-Du"
Chart (2018)	Position
Japan (Japan Hot 100)	57
South Korea (Gaon)	5
US World Digital Songs (Billboard)	9

2019 year-end chart performance for "Ddu-Du Ddu-Du"
Chart (2019)	Position
South Korea (Gaon)	92
US World Digital Songs (Billboard)	9

Note: In Australia, the EP Square Up ranked at number 61 on the singles chart, but the single was not recognised separately.

== Certifications and sales ==
Certifications and sales for "Ddu-Du Ddu-Du"
Region	Certification	Certified units/sales
Australia (ARIA)	Platinum	70,000^{‡}
Brazil (Pro-Música Brasil)	Diamond	160,000^{‡}
France (SNEP)	Platinum	200,000^{‡}
Japan Physical album	—	29,388
New Zealand (RMNZ)	Platinum	30,000^{‡}
Poland (ZPAV)	Gold	25,000^{‡}
South Korea (KMCA)	Platinum	2,500,000^{*}
Spain (Promusicae)	Gold	30,000^{‡}
United Kingdom (BPI)	Silver	200,000^{‡}
United States (RIAA)	Gold	500,000^{‡}
Streaming
Japan (RIAJ)	Platinum	100,000,000^{†}
South Korea (KMCA)	2× Platinum	200,000,000^{†}
^{*} Sales figures based on certification alone.^{‡} Sales+streaming figures based on certification alone.^{†} Streaming-only figures based on certification alone.

== Release history ==
Release dates and formats for "Ddu-Du Ddu-Du"
Region	Date	Version	Format(s)	Label(s)	Catalogue	Ref.
Various	June 15, 2018	Korean	Digital download; streaming	YG	Various	
Various	July 23, 2018	Japanese	Digital download; streaming	YGEX	Various	
Japan	August 22, 2018	Japanese	CD single	YGEX	AVCY-58711	
Japan	August 22, 2018	Japanese	CD + DVD	YGEX	AVCY-58710	

== See also ==
- List of best-selling girl group singles
- List of certified songs in South Korea
- List of Gaon Digital Chart number ones of 2018
- List of Inkigayo Chart winners (2018)
- List of K-pop songs on the Billboard charts
- List of K-pop Hot 100 number ones
- List of M Countdown Chart winners (2018)
- List of Music Bank Chart winners (2018)
- List of most-liked YouTube videos
- List of number-one songs of 2018 (Malaysia)
- List of number-one songs of 2018 (Singapore)
- List of Show! Music Core Chart winners (2018)
