= 2018 MTV Video Music Awards Japan =

Annual Japanese music awards ceremony

- Date: October 10, 2018
- Location: Tokyo
- Hosted by: Ken Ayuga & JOANN

Television/radio coverage
- Network: MTV Japan

The 2018 MTV Video Music Awards Japan was held in Tokyo on October 10, 2018.

== Main awards ==
=== Best Video of the Year ===
Kenshi Yonezu — "Lemon"

=== Best Male Video ===
Japan Kenshi Yonezu — "Lemon" | International Shawn Mendes — "In My Blood"

=== SAS Lifetime Achievement Award Japan ===
Southern All Stars

=== Best Female Video ===
Japan aiko — "Straw" | International Ariana Grande — "No Tears Left to Cry"

=== Best Group Video ===
Japan Keyakizaka46 — "Ambivalent" | International BTS — "Fake Love"

=== Best New Artist Video ===
Japan Official Hige Dandism – "No Doubt" | International Marshmello and Anne Marie – "Friends"

=== Best Rock Video ===
Wanima – Human

=== Best Alternative Video ===
Dean Fujioka – Echo

=== Best Pop Video ===
Gen Hoshino – Idea

=== Best Hip Hop Video ===
Sky-Hi – Marble

=== Best Dance Video ===
Blackpink – Ddu-Du Ddu-Du

=== Best Art Direction Video ===
Gen Hoshino – Idea

=== Best Cinematography ===
Little Glee Monster – Sekai wa Anata ni Waraikakete Iru

=== Best Choreography ===
E-girls – Show Time

== Special awards ==
=== Artist of the Year ===
Daichi Miura

=== Best Album of the Year ===
Hikaru Utada

=== Legend Award ===
Queen
