= In Your Area World Tour =

2018–2020 concert tour by Blackpink

- World tour by Blackpink
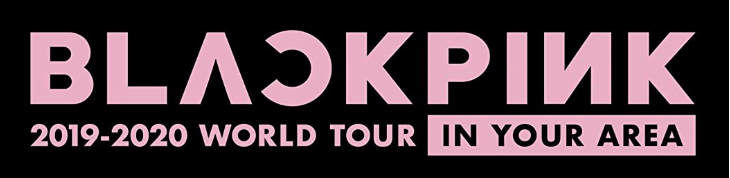
- Blackpink World Tour [In Your Area] logo
- Location: Asia; North America; Europe; Oceania
- Associated album: Square Up; Kill This Love
- Start date: November 10, 2018
- End date: February 22, 2020
- No. of shows: 36
- Attendance: 472,000
- Box office: $56,756,285

Blackpink concert chronology
- Blackpink Arena Tour 2018 (2018); In Your Area World Tour (2018–20); The Show (2021)

The In Your Area World Tour (also known as Blackpink World Tour [In Your Area]) was the first worldwide concert tour and the second overall by South Korean girl group Blackpink. The tour began on November 10, 2018, in Seoul, South Korea, and ended on February 22, 2020, in Fukuoka, Japan, in support of their EPs Square Up (2018) and Kill This Love (2019). The group held 36 shows in 26 cities in 17 countries around the world. The tour became the highest-grossing tour by a Korean girl group, before it was surpassed by Blackpink's Born Pink World Tour.

== Background ==
=== Blackpink 2018 Tour [In Your Area] Seoul x BC Card ===
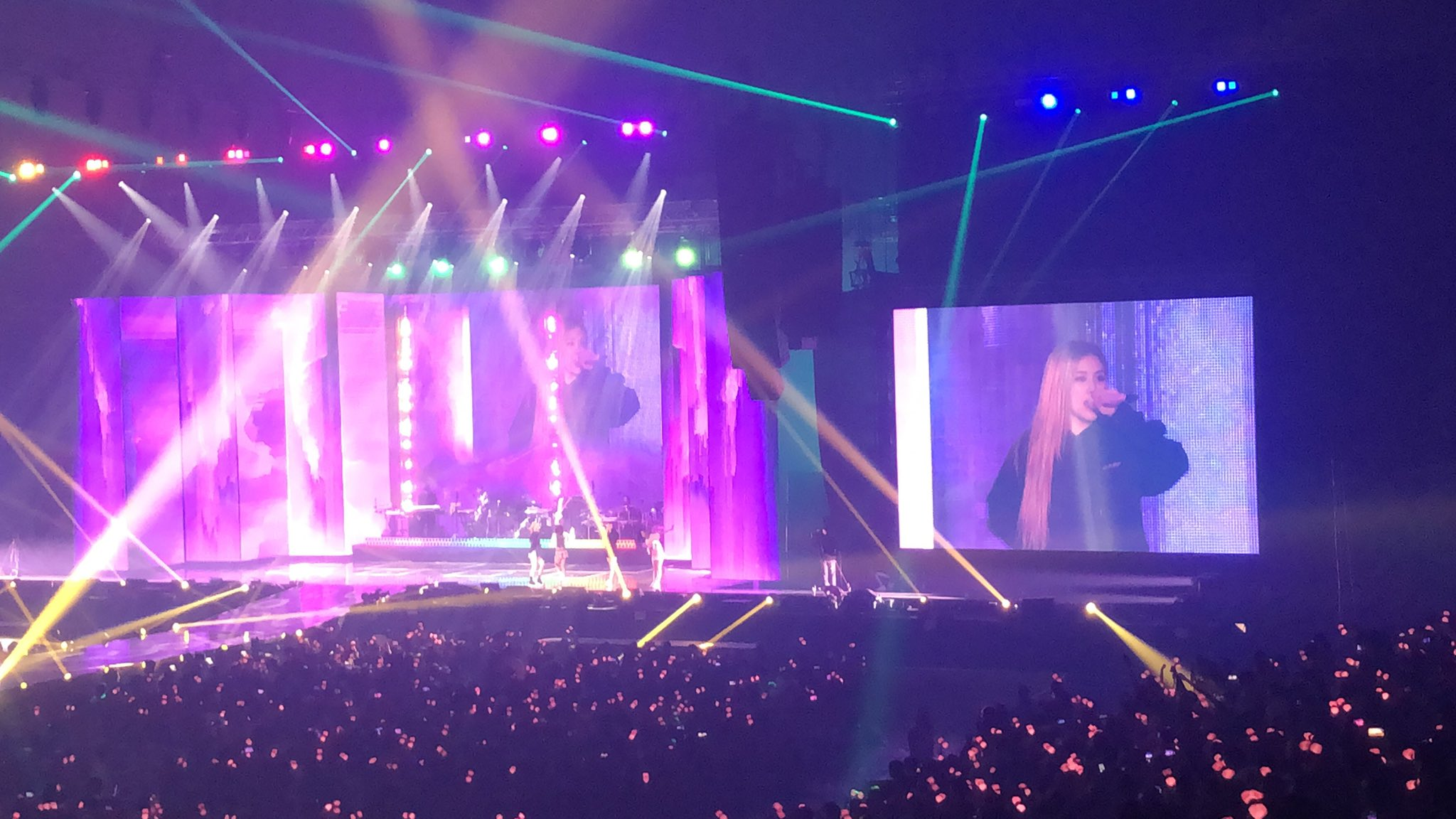
View of the stage in Seoul

On September 12, it was announced that the group would hold their first concert in Seoul, titled Blackpink 2018 Tour [In Your Area] Seoul x BC Card, on November 11 and 12 at the Olympic Gymnastics Arena. Each member of the group played an active role in planning the show; it was revealed that the title of the tour, In Your Area, was chosen by the members themselves. Tickets became available to the group's fan club members for pre-sale on September 14 via Auction Ticket and to the general public on September 18. All 20,000 tickets for the two concerts quickly sold out.

During the two-day concert at Seoul, member Jennie performed for the first time her debut solo song "Solo", which was released later on November 12, 2018. Blackpink released a 14-track live album recorded during the Seoul concerts, Blackpink 2018 Tour In Your Area Seoul, on August 30, 2019.

=== Blackpink 2019–2020 World Tour [In Your Area] ===
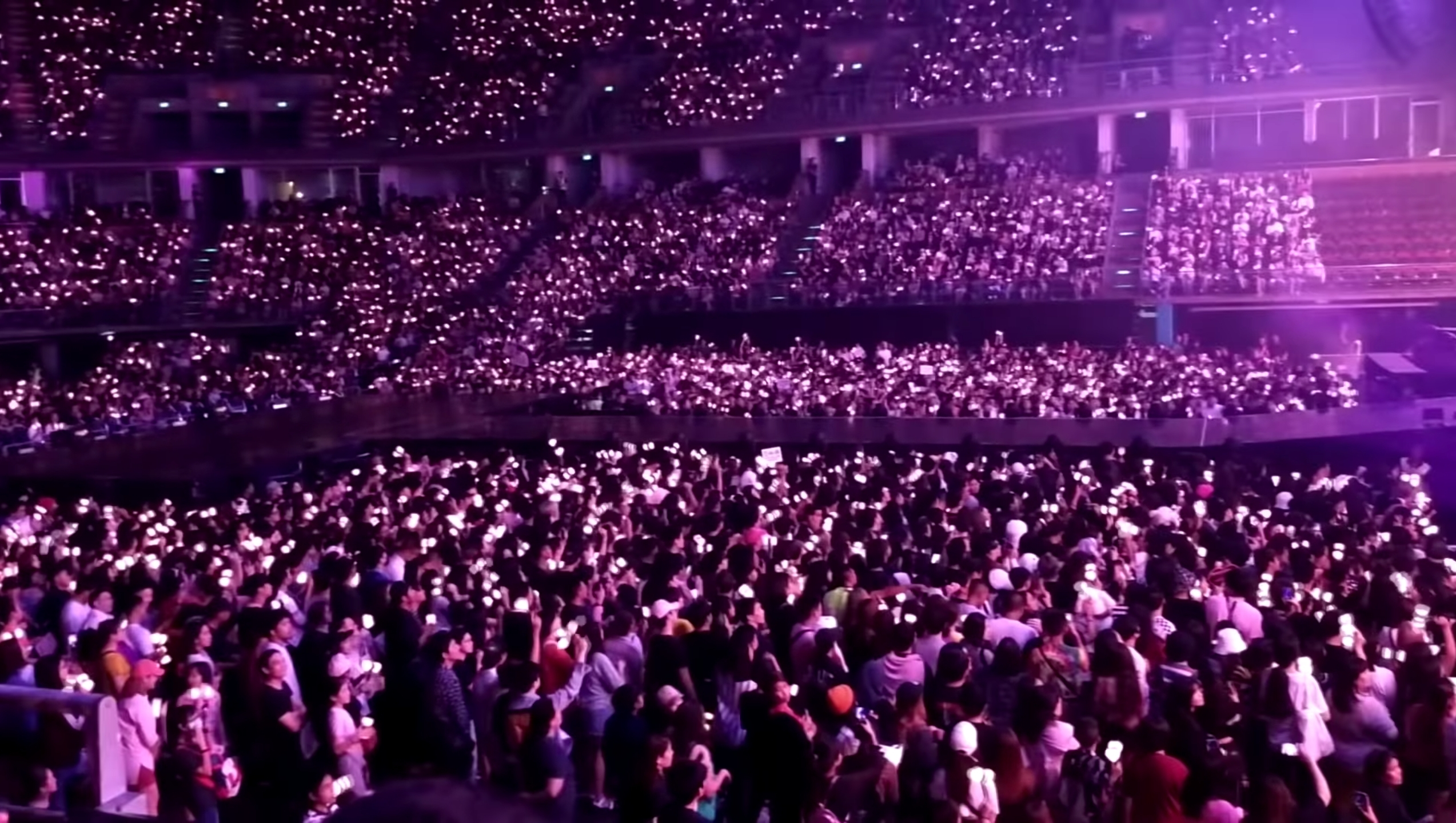
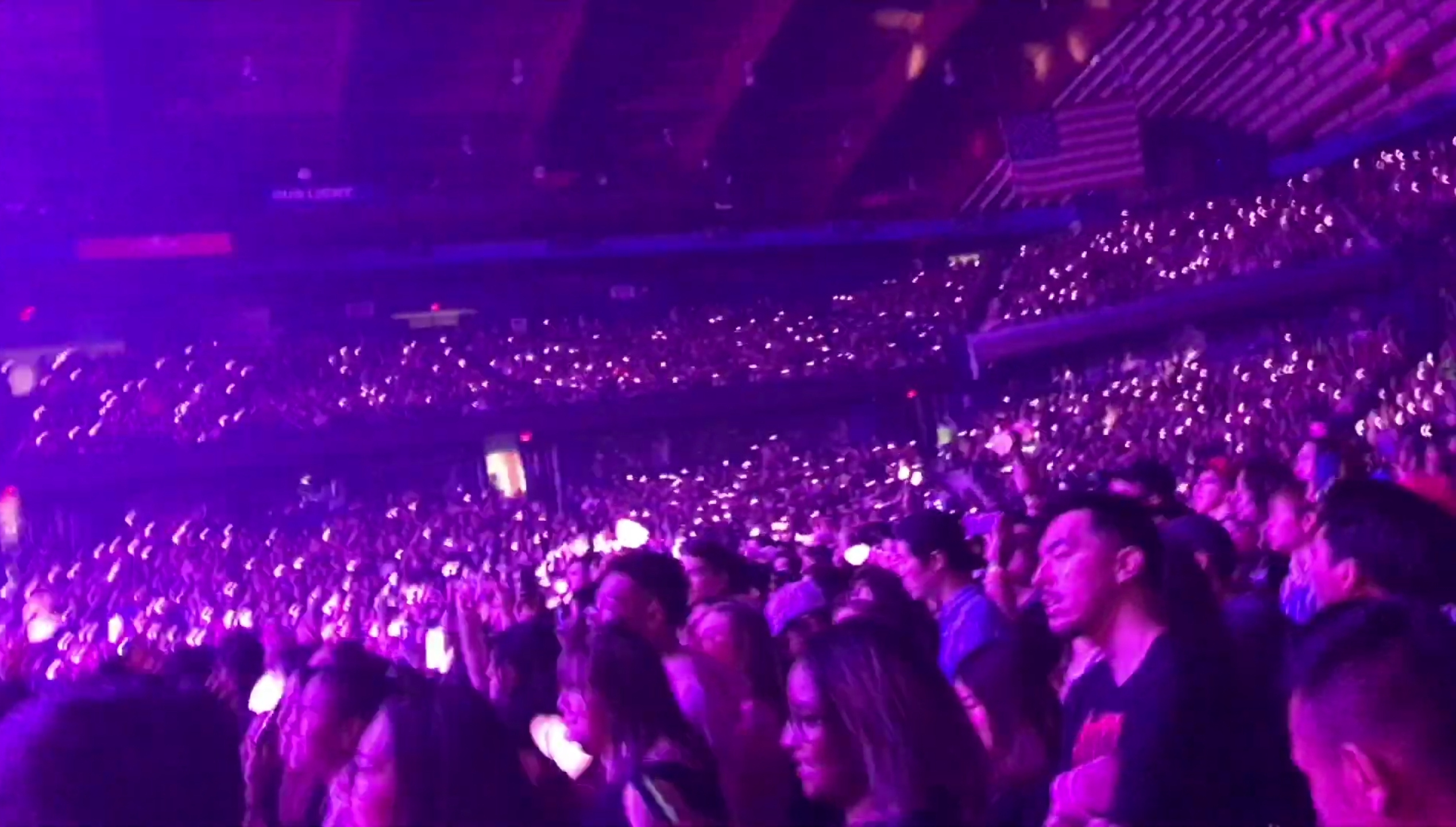
View of the audiences at the Bangkok (top) and Rosemont shows (bottom)

On October 31, 2018, Blackpink announced their first tour dates for the Asian leg, with shows in Bangkok, Jakarta, Manila, Singapore, and Kuala Lumpur commencing in mid-January 2019. On January 28, 2019, Blackpink officially announced the concert dates and venues for the European leg; the tour kicked off in Amsterdam on May 18, 2019. The group later shared the tour's North American shows, on February 11, 2019, via social media. The North American leg kicked off in Los Angeles on April 17, in between the two weekends of Coachella, where the group performed. On February 22, 2019, it was reported that all 60,000 tickets for the group's first North American tour were sold out. Blackpink announced tour dates for Australia on February 25. Kia Motors served as the tour's official sponsor.

On April 15, the group announced they would hold four dome concerts in three cities in Japan, starting in Tokyo on December 4, 2019. On January 22, 2020, it was announced that the tour's last concert at Fukuoka Dome would be broadcast live in 96 movie theaters in Japan. A live album, DVD and Blu-ray of the Tokyo Dome concert, Blackpink 2019–2020 World Tour In Your Area – Tokyo Dome –, was released on May 6, 2020. The DVD ranked first on Oricon DVD Weekly Chart (May 4–10).

== Concert synopsis ==
The show begins with a montage of a Rubik's Cube spelling out "Blackpink" and the names of the members on the main stage's screen. The cube then explodes into pink glitter and rising smoke as the group rises to the stage to perform "Ddu-Du Ddu-Du" in light pink outfits. On elevated platforms, Blackpink then performs "Forever Young" in front of an outer space-like backdrop. After performing the two verses and the second chorus on the main stage, Blackpink returns to the raised platforms with dancers to sing the final part of the song. The group then greets the audience and introduces themselves on the main stage, performing "Stay" on chairs and walking to the B-stage during the final chorus. At the B-stage, the group begins "Whistle" before being accompanied by dancers and returning to the main stage at the end. The group departs the stage for a costume change.

Depending on the leg of the tour, the order of the solo performances changes. In the first Asian leg, Jisoo commences, singing a cover of "Clarity" by Zedd on a platform of disco balls. She is followed by Lisa, who dances to a medley of songs, both solo and with dancers. In Seoul, Lisa performed to "I Like It", "Faded", and "Attention"; the dance number changed to "Take Me" and "Swalla" from the first Bangkok show onwards. Rosé is third, rising to the stage with Dante Jackson from The Band Six on piano to sing a cover medley of "Let It Be" by the Beatles, "You & I" by former label mate Park Bom and "Only Look At Me" by Taeyang. Starting on April 17, 2019, Rosé opens the solo performances in place of Jisoo. The final member to perform as a soloist is Jennie with her single "Solo" alongside multiple dancers in front of a dance hall backdrop. The Band Six plays an interlude after Jennie returns backstage for her costume change. Most members' solo set numbers changed for the final leg in Japan: Rosé with a cover of Lewis Capaldi's "Someone You Loved", Lisa with a choreography to a medley of "Good Thing" and "Señorita", and Jisoo with a cover of AKMU's "How Can I Love the Heartbreak, You're the One I Love".

After the release of their Kill This Love EP in April 2019, Blackpink opens the next segment of the show with "Kill This Love" in street-style costumes. The main screen features different scenes from the song's official music video as a backdrop. A group of dancers join Blackpink for the ending beat drop of the song in marching band costumes before leaving the stage for Blackpink to perform "Don't Know What To Do". The group then interacts with the audience. "Kiss and Make Up" is performed next, with each member standing on moving raised platforms while the screen displays tropical patterns and imagery. The Band Six and dancers later return to the main stage to accompany Blackpink for "Really" and "See U Later". They all exit the stage as a video interlude featuring Blackpink racing and drifting in Kia motorcars plays on the screens.

Blackpink, in sparkly costumes, returns to the stage from below and performs "Playing with Fire" with a gate-like setting on-screen. The backdrop changes to kaleidoscope-like graphics as the group sings "Kick It". They move to the B-stage and perform the final two songs, "Boombayah" and "As If It's Your Last", after a short interaction with the audience.

For the encore, the group reappears on stage in casual clothes to perform a remixed version of "Ddu-Du Ddu-Du". Blackpink introduces members of the touring band and dancers to the audience and thank them before enjoying an instrumental performance by The Band Six. Only the group remains onstage afterwards to sing the final song, "Hope Not"; they say goodbye to the audience before departing the stage.

== Critical reception ==
The concert received generally positive reviews from the critics. Variety drew comparisons between the all-dancing concert to Beyonce's 2018 Coachella performance, calling it "within the realm of earthly aspirational possibility" with "semi-rigid, semi-relaxed synchronization" and "major charm offensive from four quintessential Girls Next Door". Evan Real, writing for The Hollywood Reporter, stated that the girl group delivered "impressive vocals, dancing" that "not even the stage's extravagant light display or frequent bursts of fireworks could pull the group's focus from their exceptionally polished routine". Billboard described the concert as "hugely engaging" and applauded Blackpink's "remarkably natural aura" as opposed to the usual rigidity that K-pop concerts usually have, thanks to the group's improvisations and audience interaction. However, the magazine criticized the solo performances, calling Lisa's dance number "as baffling as it was boring" and Jisoo's cover of Clarity "uncomfortably close to a filler". The Guardian shared similar sentiments regarding the solo segment and gave the concert three stars out of five, stating that while the show had "brilliant moments throughout", it did not "take enough risks". On the other hand, Jan Lee of The Straits Times felt the solo performances were enjoyable and the concert's energy was infectious; he described the members of Blackpink as "exuberant, charming and visually stunning onstage", though he felt the show needed more original material from the group.

== Accolades ==
Organization	Award	Result	Ref.
2019 Teen Choice Awards	Choice Summer Tour	Nominated	
45th People's Choice Awards	The Concert Tour of 2019	Won	

== Commercial performance ==
The In Your Area World Tour became the most successful tour by a Korean female group in history. It recorded a 96.6% rate of seat occupancy for the first 32 concerts, excluding the concerts in Japan. Among them, 22 concerts in cities such as Bangkok, Jakarta, Manila, Singapore, Kuala Lumpur, Los Angeles, Chicago, Hamilton, Newark, Fort Worth, Paris, Macau, and Melbourne were sold out. All four dome concerts for the Japan leg were also sold out.

== Setlist ==
The North American setlist was performed at the show at Prudential Center in Newark, New Jersey on May 1, 2019. It does not represent all shows throughout the tour.

Set list of the first show in Seoul

Act 1

1. "Ddu-Du Ddu-Du"
2. "Forever Young"
3. "Stay" (remix)
4. "Sure Thing"
5. "Whistle"

Act 2

1. "Clarity" (Jisoo solo)
2. "I Like It" / "Faded" / "Attention" (dance performance) (Lisa solo)
3. "Let It Be" / "You & I" / "Only Look at Me" (Rosé solo)
4. "Solo" (Jennie solo)

Act 3

1. "Kiss and Make Up"
2. "So Hot" (The Black Label remix)
3. "Really"
4. "See U Later"
5. "Playing with Fire"
6. "16 Shots" (dance performance)
7. "Boombayah"
8. "As If It's Your Last"

Encore

1. "Whistle" (remix)
2. "Ddu-Du Ddu-Du" (encore version)
3. "Stay"
Setlist in Asia (exclude Seoul and Japan)

Act 1 (open VCR)

1. "Ddu-Du Ddu-Du"
2. "Forever Young"
3. "Stay" (remix)
4. "Whistle"

Act 2 (solos)

1. "Clarity" (Jisoo solo)
2. "Take Me" / "Swalla" (dance performance) (Lisa solo)
3. "Let It Be" / "You & I" / "Only Look at Me" (Rosé solo)
4. "Solo" (Jennie solo)

Act 3

1. "Kiss and Make Up"
2. "So Hot" (The Black Label remix)
3. "Playing with Fire"
4. "Really"
5. "See U Later"
6. "16 Shots" (dance performance)
7. "Boombayah"
8. "As If It's Your Last"

Encore

1. "Ddu-Du Ddu-Du"
2. "Stay"
Set list in North America, Europe and Australia
1. "Ddu-Du Ddu-Du"
2. "Forever Young"
3. "Stay" (remix)
4. "Whistle"
5. "Let It Be" / "You & I" / "Only Look at Me" (Rosé solo)
6. "Take Me" / "Swalla" (dance performance) (Lisa solo)
7. "Clarity" (Jisoo solo)
8. "Solo" (Jennie solo)
9. "Kill This Love"
10. "Don't Know What to Do"
11. "Kiss and Make Up"
12. "Really"
13. "See U Later"
14. "Playing with Fire"
15. "Kick It"
16. "Boombayah"
17. "As If It's Your Last"

Encore

1. "Ddu-Du Ddu-Du" (remix)
2. "Hope Not"
Setlist in Japan
1. "Ddu-Du Ddu-Du" (Japanese)
2. "Forever Young" (Japanese)
3. "Stay" (remix) (Japanese)
4. "Whistle" (Japanese)
5. "Someone You Loved" (Rosé solo)
6. "Good Thing" / "Señorita" (dance performance) (Lisa solo)
7. "How Can I Love the Heartbreak, You're the One I Love" (Jisoo solo)
8. "Solo" (Jennie solo)
9. "Kill This Love" (Japanese)
10. "Don't Know What to Do" (Japanese)
11. "Kiss and Make Up"
12. "Really" (Japanese)
13. "See U Later" (Japanese)
14. "Playing with Fire" (Japanese)
15. "Kick It" (Japanese)
16. "Boombayah" (Japanese)
17. "As If It's Your Last" (Japanese)

Encore

1. "Ddu-Du Ddu-Du" (remix) (Japanese)
2. "Whistle" (acoustic version) (Japanese)
3. "Hope Not"
Notes
- During the show in Los Angeles, they performed "Whistle" acoustic version instead of the original version. During the encore stage, "Stay" was performed instead of "Hope Not".
- During the first show in Newark, Dua Lipa joined Blackpink to perform "Kiss and Make Up".
- During the show in Manchester, Blackpink modified elements of their performances with due respect to the approaching 2nd anniversary of the Manchester Arena bombing incident. Specifically, "Ddu-Du Ddu-Du" was removed from the setlist, "Whistle" lyrics and "Kill This Love" choreography were changed. During the encore stage, Blackpink dedicated "Stay" to the victims and those affected by the attack; another performance of "Don't Know What To Do" was added along with the original setlist.
- During the show in Melbourne and Sydney, Rosé added "Coming Home" to her solo medley performance.
- During the show in Sydney, "Stay" was added to the encore performance.

== Tour dates ==
List of tour dates
Date	City	Country	Venue	Attendance
November 10, 2018	Seoul	South Korea	Olympic Gymnastics Arena	20,000
November 11, 2018	Seoul	South Korea	Olympic Gymnastics Arena	20,000
January 11, 2019	Bangkok	Thailand	Impact Arena	—
January 12, 2019	Bangkok	Thailand	Impact Arena	—
January 13, 2019	Bangkok	Thailand	Impact Arena	—
January 19, 2019	Jakarta	Indonesia	Indonesia Convention Exhibition	—
January 20, 2019	Jakarta	Indonesia	Indonesia Convention Exhibition	—
January 26, 2019	Hong Kong		AsiaWorld–Arena	10,000
February 2, 2019	Pasay (Note: Promoted as Manila)	Philippines	SM Mall of Asia Arena	—
February 15, 2019	Singapore		Singapore Indoor Stadium	9,500
February 23, 2019	Shah Alam (Note: Promoted as Kuala Lumpur)	Malaysia	Malawati Stadium	16,000
February 24, 2019	Shah Alam	Malaysia	Malawati Stadium	16,000
March 3, 2019	Taoyuan (Note: Promoted as Taipei)	Taiwan	NTSU Arena	8,000
April 17, 2019	Inglewood	United States	The Forum	15,000
April 24, 2019	Rosemont	United States	Allstate Arena	—
April 27, 2019	Hamilton	Canada	FirstOntario Centre	—
May 1, 2019	Newark	United States	Prudential Center	20,000
May 2, 2019	Newark	United States	Prudential Center	20,000
May 5, 2019	Duluth	United States	Infinite Energy Arena	9,180
May 8, 2019	Fort Worth	United States	Fort Worth Convention Center	—
May 18, 2019	Amsterdam	Netherlands	AFAS Live	—
May 21, 2019	Manchester	England	Manchester Arena	5,424
May 22, 2019	London	England	SSE Arena, Wembley	9,968
May 24, 2019	Berlin	Germany	Max-Schmeling-Halle	10,000
May 26, 2019	Paris	France	Zénith Paris	7,000
May 28, 2019	Barcelona	Spain	Palau Sant Jordi	10,000
June 8, 2019	Macau		Cotai Arena	10,000
June 13, 2019	Melbourne	Australia	Rod Laver Arena	—
June 15, 2019	Sydney	Australia	Qudos Bank Arena	14,317
July 12, 2019	Bangkok	Thailand	Impact Arena	30,000
July 13, 2019	Bangkok	Thailand	Impact Arena	30,000
July 14, 2019	Bangkok	Thailand	Impact Arena	30,000
December 4, 2019	Tokyo	Japan	Tokyo Dome	55,000
January 4, 2020	Osaka	Japan	Kyocera Dome	100,000
January 5, 2020	Osaka	Japan	Kyocera Dome	100,000
February 22, 2020	Fukuoka	Japan	Fukuoka Dome	—
Total				472,000

=== Box office score data ===
Venue	City	Tickets sold / Available	Gross revenue
Infinite Energy Center	Duluth, Georgia, US	9,180 / 9,339 (98.2%)	$1,518,063
Manchester Arena	Manchester, England	5,424 / 6,121 (88.6%)	$682,256
SSE Arena, Wembley	London, England	9,968 / 10,074 (98.9%)	$1,421,480
Qudos Bank Arena	Sydney, Australia	14,317 / 14,491 (98.8%)	$1,542,850

=== Cancelled show ===
List of cancelled concerts
Date	City	Country	Venue
May 9, 2019	Fort Worth	United States	Fort Worth Convention Center

== Personnel ==
Blackpink

- Jisoo
- Jennie
- Rosé
- Lisa

Band

- Omar Dominick: Bass
- Dante Jackson: Keyboard
- Justin Lyons: Guitar
- Bennie Rodgers II: Drums

== Live albums ==
Two live albums were released for the In Your Area World Tour: Blackpink 2018 Tour 'In Your Area' Seoul, and Blackpink 2019–2020 World Tour in Your Area – Tokyo Dome.

=== Blackpink 2018 Tour 'In Your Area' Seoul ===
Blackpink 2018 Tour 'In Your Area' Seoul
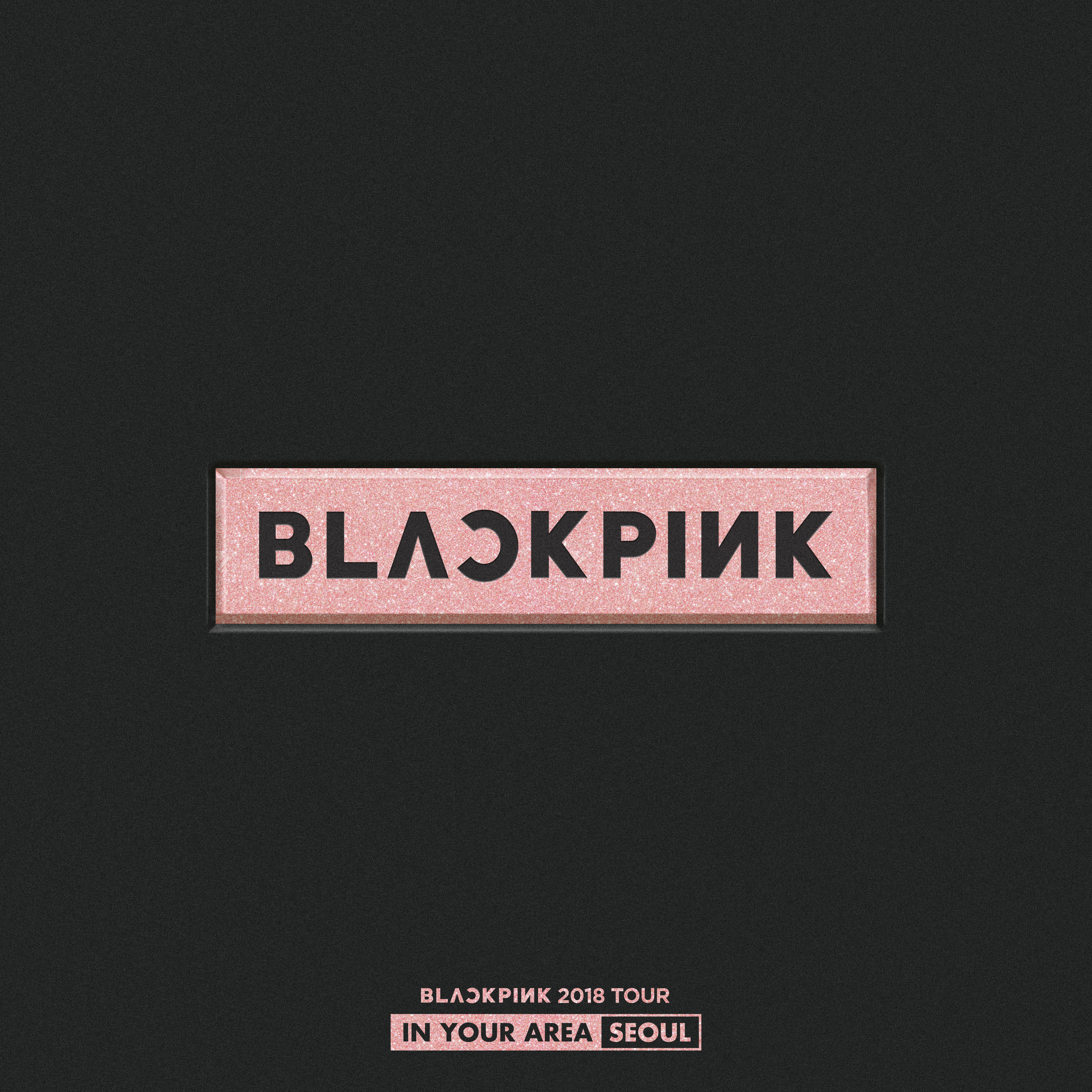
- Digital and streaming cover

Live album by Blackpink
- Released: August 8, 2019
- Recorded: November 10, 2018
- Venue: Olympic Gymnastics Arena
- Genre: K-pop
- Languages: Korean; English
- Labels: YG; YG Plus; Interscope

Blackpink chronology
Kill This Love (2019)	Blackpink 2018 Tour 'In Your Area' Seoul (2019)	Blackpink 2019–2020 World Tour in Your Area – Tokyo Dome (2019)

Blackpink 2018 Tour 'In Your Area' Seoul is the second live album by the South Korean girl group Blackpink. It was released digitally on August 8, 2019, and was released on DVD on August 30, 2019.

==== Track listing ====
1. "Duu-Du Duu-Du"
2. "Forever Young"
3. "Stay"
4. "Sure Thing" (Cover)
5. "Whistle"
6. "Clarity" (Jisoo Solo, cover)
7. "I Like It, Faded, Attention" (Lisa Solo, dance cover)
8. "Let It Be, You & I + Only Look at Me" (Rose Solo)
9. "Solo" (Jennie Solo)
10. "Kiss & Make Up"
11. "Really"
12. "See U Later"
13. "Playing With Fire"
14. "16 Shots" (Dance cover)
15. "Boombayah"
16. "As If It's Your Last"
17. "Whistle" (Acoustic\Remix vers.)
18. "Duu-Du Duu-Du" (Encore vers.)
19. "Stay" (Encore vers.)

=== Blackpink 2019–2020 World Tour in Your Area – Tokyo Dome ===
Blackpink 2019–2020 World Tour In Your Area – Tokyo Dome
- Digital and streaming cover

Live album by Blackpink
- Released: May 14, 2020
- Recorded: December 4, 2019
- Venue: Tokyo Dome
- Genre: J-pop
- Languages: Japanese; English
- Labels: Universal; Interscope

Blackpink chronology
Blackpink 2018 Tour 'In Your Area' Seoul (2019)	Blackpink 2019–2020 World Tour In Your Area – Tokyo Dome (2020)	The Album (2020)

Blackpink 2019–2020 World Tour in Your Area – Tokyo Dome is the third live album by the South Korean girl group Blackpink. It was released on May 14, 2020.

==== Track listing ====
1. "Ddu-Du Ddu-Du" (Japanese version)
2. "Forever Young" (Japanese version)
3. "Stay" (Japanese version, remix)
4. "Whistle" (Japanese version)
5. "Kill This Love" (Japanese version)
6. "Don't Know What to Do" (Japanese version)
7. "Really" (Japanese version)
8. "See U Later" (Japanese version)
9. "Playing with Fire" (Japanese version)
10. "Kick It" (Japanese version)
11. "Boombayah" (Japanese version)
12. "As If It's Your Last" (Japanese version)

== See also ==
- List of highest-grossing concert tours by female groups
