= Forever Young (Blackpink song) =

2018 song by Blackpink

Promotional single by Blackpink

from the EP Square Up
- Released: June 15, 2018
- Recorded: 2015
- Genre: K-pop; moombahton
- Length: 3:59
- Label: YG; Genie
- Songwriters: Teddy; Future Bounce
- Producers: Teddy; Future Bounce

Dance practice video
- "Forever Young" on YouTube

"Forever Young" is a song recorded by South Korean girl group Blackpink. It serves as the sub-title track from the group's first Korean extended play Square Up, released on June 15, 2018. It was written and produced by Teddy and Future Bounce, and originally recorded in 2015. A Japanese version of the song was included in the group's first Japanese compilation album, Blackpink in Your Area (2018).

"Forever Young" experienced commercial success despite not being released as a single, where it peaked at number two on the Gaon Digital Chart in South Korea. It sold over 2.5 million digital downloads and became the group's second song to receive a platinum certification from the Korea Music Content Association (KMCA). In Japan, it peaked at number 36 on the Japan Hot 100 and was certified gold by the Recording Industry Association of Japan (RIAJ) for surpassing 50 million streams in the country. It additionally reached the top five in Malaysia and Singapore.

== Background and development ==
Prior to Blackpink's debut, the members were heard singing the song from outside of YG's building in November 2015.

Blackpink began the recording process for "Forever Young" a year prior to their official debut in 2016. An Instagram video from November 15, 2015, resurfaced following the official release of the song, capturing the group members singing a portion of the then-unreleased track from outside of YG Entertainment's headquarters in Seoul. The person recording originally believed that it was an upcoming song by 2NE1, the agency's only girl group at the time, but expressed doubt as the voices of the singers were different from the members of the group. It was later observed in 2018 that Blackpink members Rosé and Lisa were singing their lines from the first verse.

"Forever Young" was written and produced by Teddy and Future Bounce, and runs for three minutes and fifty-nine seconds. Tamar Herman of Billboard characterized "Forever Young" as a song with a "beachy" vibe rooted in moombahton, where the members proclaim "Blackpink is the revolution" in the lyrics. She also highlighted the inclusion of English-language swear words in the song, which she regarded as an uncommon occurrence in songs by K-pop girl groups. Chase McMullen from The 405 noted the track's influences from reggaeton and balaeric beat. The song was released as the "sub-title" track for the group's first Korean mini album Square Up on June 15, 2018. A Japanese-language version of "Forever Young" was included in the group's first compilation album release in Japan, titled Blackpink in Your Area, which was first made available through YGEX on November 23, 2018.

== Critical reception ==
"Forever Young" was met with generally positive reviews from music critics. Chase McMullen from The 405 wrote that although "YG has been holding on to the song for years", "it hardly matters when the groove kicks in" and deemed it the best track from Square Up. Tone Glow placed it at number 11 on their list of the top 50 Korean songs of 2018, noting that "Forever Young" triumphs due to its "vibrant energy", despite its "straightforward" composition. In 2019, Rhian Daily from NME ranked it as the group's third-best track, commenting that the group embraced the moombahton genre with laser-like house beats and reggaeton rhythms to create a "vibrant and colourful foundation" for a song that celebrates youth. Conversely, Palmer Haasch from Insider felt that while the song is catchy, it lacked a certain connection, resulting in an "ending that was not as satisfying as it could have been."

=== Accolades ===
At year-end award shows, "Forever Young" received a nomination for Artist of the Year – Digital Music (June) at the 8th Gaon Chart Music Awards alongside Square Up's lead single "Ddu-Du Ddu-Du", with the latter winning the award.

== Commercial performance ==
The song was commercially successful in South Korea upon the release of Square Up. "Forever Young" peaked at number two on the Gaon Digital Chart during the week of June 23, 2018, with "Ddu-Du Ddu-Du" occupying number one. It also reached the top five in Malaysia and Singapore, and peaked at number four on the US World Digital Song Sales chart. It additionally peaked at number 10 on the New Zealand Hot Singles chart and number 36 on the Billboard Japan Hot 100. The song was certified platinum for download and streaming by the Korea Music Content Association (KMCA), for reaching 2.5 million digital downloads and 100 million streams, respectively. In July 2023, it was certified gold by the Recording Industry Association of Japan (RIAJ) for having surpassed 50 million streams.

== Promotion and live performances ==
To promote "Forever Young", Blackpink premiered it live along with "Ddu-Du Ddu-Du" on the music program Show! Music Core on June 16, 2018. They performed it on Inkigayo for the first time the following day. On June 20, the dance practice video for "Forever Young" was uploaded to Blackpink's official YouTube channel; it garnered over 200 million views on the platform by December 2021. "Forever Young" was featured on the setlist of Japan Arena Tour (2018), In Your Area World Tour (2018–2020), and Born Pink World Tour (2022–2023).

During Blackpink's appearance at the Lotte Duty Free Family Festival on June 24, a staff member abruptly halted the group's performance of "Forever Young" before escorting the members off stage. The group did not return to finish their performance, leaving fans angry and confused. The event organizers soon apologized for the incident. At year-end award ceremonies and festivals, Blackpink performed a medley consisting of "Solo", "Ddu-Du Ddu-Du" and "Forever Young" at the 2018 SBS Gayo Daejeon held on December 25. They made a performance with the song at the 33rd Golden Disc Awards on January 5 and the 8th Gaon Chart Music Awards on January 23, 2019.

In the United States, Blackpink performed "Forever Young" on Good Morning America and Strahan and Sara in February 2019. In April, it was performed during the group's appearance at the 2019 Coachella Festival as a part of their 11-song setlist. In April 2023, Blackpink became the first Korean artist to headline the festival and concluded their performance with "Forever Young", which was set against a backdrop of exploding fireworks.

== Credits and personnel ==
Credits adapted from Tidal

- Blackpink – vocals
- Teddy – lyricist, composer, arranger
- Future Bounce – composer, arranger
- R. Tee – arranger

== Charts ==
=== Weekly charts ===
Weekly chart performance for "Forever Young"
Chart (2018)	Peak position
Japan Hot 100 (Billboard)	36
New Zealand Hot Singles (RMNZ)	10
Malaysia (RIM)	5
Singapore (RIAS)	3
South Korea (Gaon)	2
South Korea (K-pop Hot 100)	2
UK Independent Singles Breakers (Official Charts)	13
US World Digital Songs (Billboard)	4

=== Monthly charts ===
Monthly chart performance for "Forever Young"
Chart (2018)	Peak position
South Korea (Gaon)	6

=== Year-end charts ===
2018 year-end chart performance for "Forever Young"
Chart (2018)	Position
South Korea (Gaon)	32

2019 year-end chart performance for "Forever Young"
Chart (2019)	Position
South Korea (Gaon)	176

== Certifications ==
Certifications for "Forever Young"
Region	Certification	Certified units/sales
Brazil (Pro-Música Brasil)	2× Platinum	80,000^{‡}
South Korea (KMCA)	Platinum	2,500,000^{*}
Streaming
Japan (RIAJ)	Gold	50,000,000^{†}
South Korea (KMCA)	Platinum	100,000,000^{†}
^{*} Sales figures based on certification alone.^{‡} Sales+streaming figures based on certification alone.^{†} Streaming-only figures based on certification alone.

== See also ==
- List of best-selling girl group singles
- List of certified songs in South Korea
- List of K-pop songs on the Billboard charts
