= Blackpink Arena Tour 2018 =

2018 concert tour by Blackpink

- National tour by Blackpink
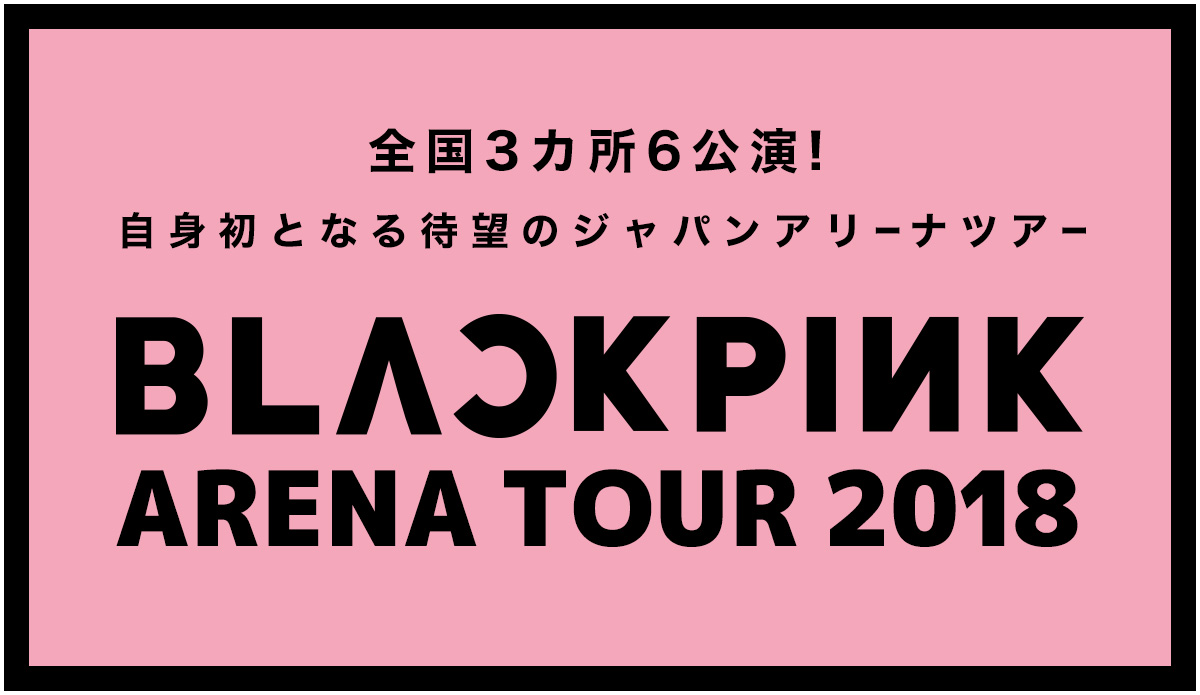
- Blackpink Arena Tour 2018 poster
- Location: Japan
- Associated album: Blackpink; Blackpink in Your Area
- Start date: July 24, 2018
- End date: December 24, 2018
- No. of shows: 8
- Attendance: 125,000

Blackpink concert chronology
- Blackpink Arena Tour (2018); In Your Area World Tour (2018–20)

Blackpink Arena Tour 2018 was the first Japanese concert tour by South Korean girl group Blackpink. The tour was held in Japan, from July 24 to December 24, 2018, to promote their first Japanese extended play Blackpink.

== Background ==
Six shows were initially scheduled. An extra show was later in Chiba added due to overwhelming demand. On July 7, the final stop of the tour was added for December 24 at Kyocera Dome Osaka. They embarked on their first concert tour of Japan titled "Black Pink Arena Tour 2018" in Osaka on July 24 and July 25.

== Set list ==
Setlist from Osaka Jo hall to Mukahari Messe

1. "Ddu-Du-Ddu-Du"
2. "Forever Young"
3. "Whistle" (acoustic version)
4. "Stay" (Japanese version)
5. "Can't Take My Eyes Off You" (Frankie Valli cover) (Jennie solo cover)
6. "Eyes Closed" / "Eyes, Nose, Lips" (Rosé solo cover)
7. "Lemon" / "Faded" / "Attention" (Lisa solo dance cover)
8. "Sakurairo Mau Koro" (Jisoo solo cover)
9. "Yoncé" (Beyoncé cover, dance number)
10. "So Hot" (The Black Label remix) (Wonder Girls cover)
11. "See U Later"
12. "Really"
13. "Boombayah" (Japanese version)
14. "Playing With Fire" (Japanese version)
15. "As If It's Your Last" (Japanese version)

Encore

1. "Whistle" (Japanese version)
2. "Ddu-Du-Ddu-Du"

Setlist for Special Final in Kyocera Dome

1. "Ddu-Du Ddu-Du"
2. "Forever Young"
3. "Whistle (acoustic)"
4. "Stay"
5. "I Like It" / "Faded" / "Attention" (Lisa solo dance cover)
6. "Let It be" / "You & I" / "Only Look At Me" (Rosé solo cover)
7. "Yuki No Hana" (Jisoo solo cover)
8. "Solo" (Jennie solo)
9. "Jingle Bell Rock" (dance cover)
10. "Last Christmas" / "Rudolph The Red-Nosed Reindeer" (cover)
11. "Kiss & Makeup"
12. "So Hot" (The Black Label remix) (Wonder Girls cover)
13. "Really"
14. "See U Later"
15. "Boombayah"
16. "Playing With Fire"
17. "As If Its Your Last"

Encore

1. "Whistle (remix)"
2. "Ddu-Du Ddu-Du"
3. "Stay (remix)"

== Tour dates ==
Date	City	Venue	Attendance
July 24, 2018	Osaka	Osaka-jō Hall	75,000
July 25, 2018	Osaka	Osaka-jō Hall	75,000
August 16, 2018	Fukuoka	Kokusai Center	75,000
August 17, 2018	Fukuoka	Kokusai Center	75,000
August 24, 2018	Chiba	Makuhari Messe	75,000
August 25, 2018	Chiba	Makuhari Messe	75,000
August 26, 2018	Chiba	Makuhari Messe	75,000
December 24, 2018	Osaka	Kyocera Dome Osaka	50,000
Total			125,000

== Live album ==
Blackpink Arena Tour 2018 "Special Final in Kyocera Dome Osaka"
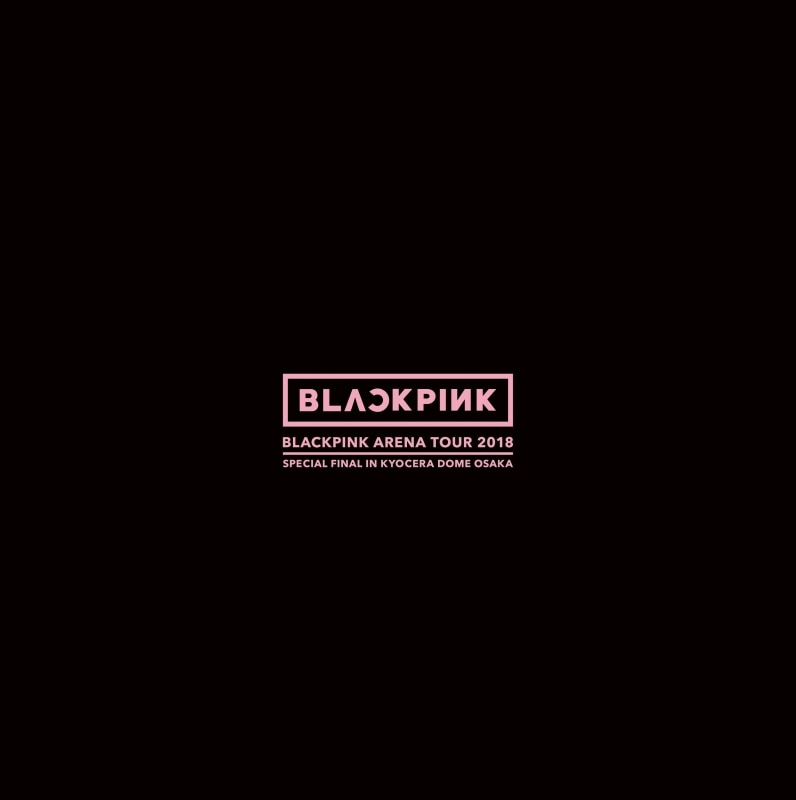

Live album by Blackpink
- Released: March 22, 2019
- Recorded: December 24, 2018
- Venue: Kyocera Dome Osaka
- Genre: J-pop
- Length: 55:46
- Label: YGEX

Blackpink chronology
Blackpink in Your Area (2018)	Blackpink Arena Tour 2018 "Special Final in Kyocera Dome Osaka" (2019)	Kill This Love (2019)

Blackpink Arena Tour 2018 "Special Final in Kyocera Dome Osaka" is the debut live album by the South Korean girl group Blackpink. It was released on March 22, 2019.

=== Background ===
The Blackpink Arena Tour group's first Japanese concert began in July 2018, visited three cities in Japan and hosted a total of eight concerts, bringing together a total of 125,000 spectators. This video album contains live videos of the final show at the Osaka Dome on December 24, 2018, with the participation of 50,000 fans. The album includes live performances and recordings of "Boombayah", "Whistle", "Stay", "Playing with Fire", "As If It's Your Last" and "Ddu-Du Ddu-Du".

The album's release was originally scheduled for March 13, 2019, but was postponed to March 22.

=== Track listing ===
1. "Ddu-Du Ddu-Du" (Japanese version)
2. "Forever Young" (Japanese version)
3. "Whistle" (acoustic; Japanese version)
4. "Stay" (Japanese version)
5. "Let It Be / You & I / Only Look at Me" (Rosé's Solo Stage)
6. "Yukino Hana" (Jisoo's Solo Stage)
7. "Solo" (Jennie's Solo Stage)
8. "Last Christmas / Rudolph the Red-Nosed Reindeer"
9. "Kiss and Make Up" (Blackpink only version) (Cover Song)
10. "So Hot" (The Black Label Remix)
11. "Really" (Japanese version)
12. "See U Later" (Japanese version)
13. "Boombayah" (Japanese version)
14. "Playing with Fire" (Japanese version)
15. "As If It's Your Last" (Japanese version)

== Personnel ==
Blackpink

- Jisoo
- Jennie
- Rosé
- Lisa

Band

- Omar Dominick (Bass)
- Dante Jackson (Keyboard)
- Justin Lyons (Guitar)
- Bennie Rodgers II (Drums)
