= Square Up =

- Digital and Pink version cover

EP by Blackpink
- Released: June 15, 2018
- Recorded: 2015; 2017-2018
- Genres: K-pop; hip hop; dance; R&B
- Length: 14:03
- Languages: Korean; English
- Label: YG
- Producers: Teddy; Bekuh Boom; Future Bounce; R. Tee; 24; Choice37

Blackpink chronology
Blackpink (2017)	Square Up (2018)	Blackpink in Your Area (2018)

Singles from Square Up
- 1. "Ddu-Du Ddu-Du" Released: June 15, 2018

Square Up is the first Korean extended play (second overall) by South Korean girl group Blackpink. It was released on June 15, 2018 by YG Entertainment. The EP is available in two physical versions and contains four tracks, with "Ddu-Du Ddu-Du" released as the lead single. The song peaked at number one in South Korea for three weeks and became the highest-charting song by a female K-pop act in the United States and United Kingdom at the time. The track "Forever Young" was later promoted on Korean music programs and peaked at number two in South Korea.

Upon its release, Square Up debuted atop the Gaon Album Chart and went on to sell almost 179,000 copies in its first fifteen days of availability in South Korea. The EP also debuted at number 40 on the US Billboard 200, becoming Blackpink's highest selling album in a Western market as well as the highest-charting album by a female K-pop group. It was certified platinum by the Korea Music Content Association (KMCA) in March 2019 for selling 250,000 units, and was later certified double platinum in March 2023 for selling 500,000 units.

== Background and release ==
On April 24, 2018, YG Entertainment founder Yang Hyun-suk stated that by the end of 2018, Blackpink would release new music. On May 17, he confirmed that the group would make a comeback in June. An official news report revealed that the EP would be released on June 15.

On June 1, the EP's moving poster was unveiled, followed by the full track list on June 5 and an individual moving poster of the members, teasing the audio of "Ddu-Du Ddu-Du" and "Forever Young". Subsequently, from June 12 to 14, the EP's teaser posters were released.

On June 14, a teaser of the music video for "Ddu-Du Ddu-Du" was released on both Blackpink's official YouTube channel and the group's official V Live channel. On June 15, the EP was released, alongside the music video for "Ddu-Du Ddu-Du".

== Composition ==
The opening track "Ddu-Du Ddu-Du" is a "fierce" hip-hop and pop rap song with bubblegum pop sound and trap beat. It combines instrumentations of oriental percussion rhythms and whistling on top of the bassline. Lyrically, the song is an anthem about the group's success and self-confidence, based around the hook of "Hit you with that ddu-du ddu-du du". The second track "Forever Young" is a mid-tempo "beachy", moombahton-based dance track with "lasering" house beats and reggaeton swing. The lyrics talk about how they celebrate making the most of your youth, while saying "Blackpink is the revolution". The third track "Really" is a "chill" hip-pop and R&B song about pleading with a lover to show him how much they care. The closing track "See U Later" is a "cutting breakup" dance-pop song that mixes pop and hip-hop with a "trap-laden" chorus, "reminiscent" guitar sound and the distortion 808 bass.

== Promotion ==
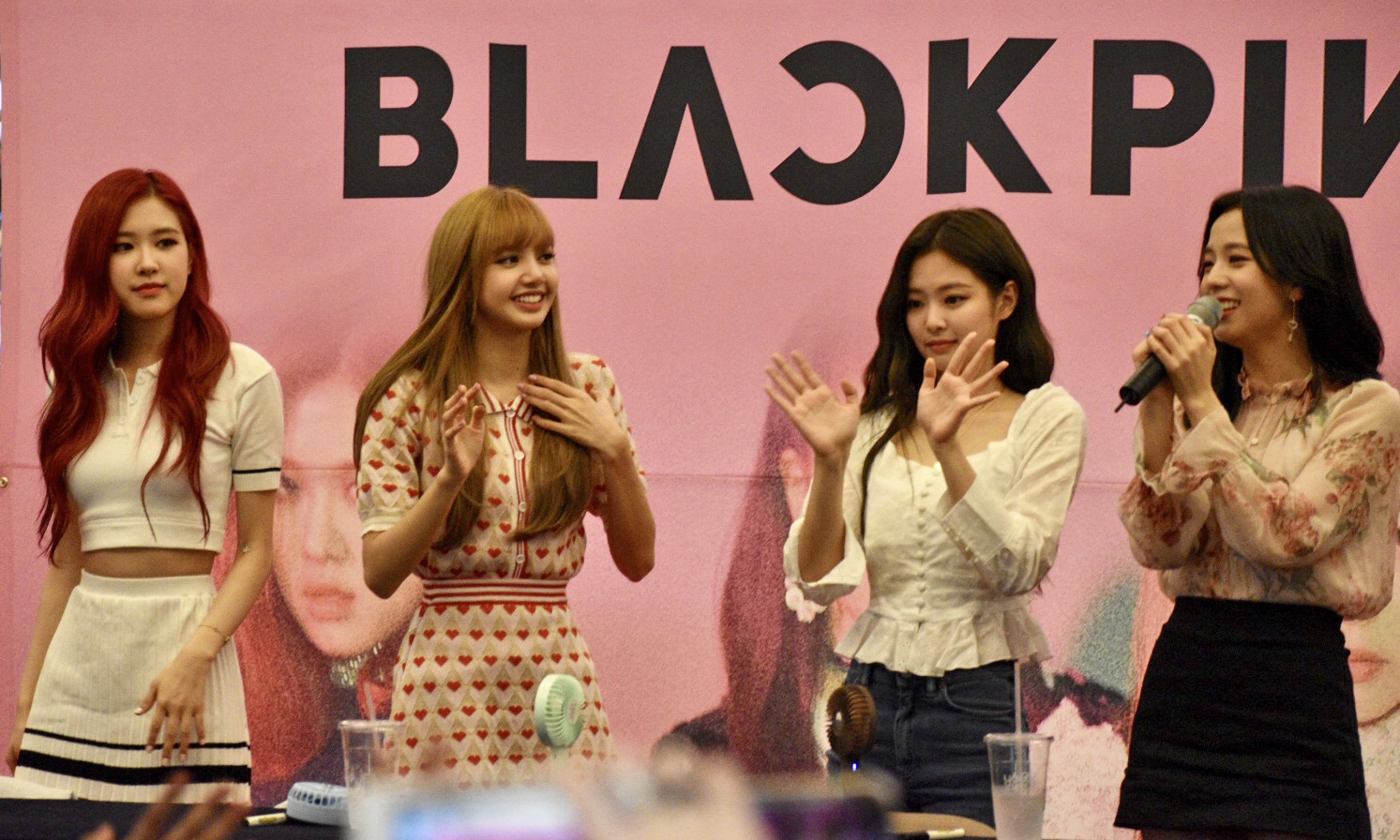
Blackpink at an autograph event for "Square Up" in Bundang on June 24, 2018

On the afternoon of June 15, Blackpink held a press conference for the release of "Square Up" at M-Cube, Sinsa-dong, Seoul. On the same day, one hour prior to the EP's release, a countdown special live was broadcast on Naver's V Live broadcasting site featuring Blackpink discussing the new music. It garnered over 850,000 viewers. On June 16, "Blackpink Area", a Square Up concept pop-up store was made public to the fans, at the same location where Blackpink House was filmed, for 9 days. On June 23, the group appeared as guests on JTBC's Idol Room to promote the EP, making their debut on the show.

Blackpink held their comeback stage on MBC's Show! Music Core on June 16 and on SBS's Inkigayo on June 17 featuring performances of both the lead single "Ddu-Du Ddu-Du" and the second single "Forever Young", and further continued promoting on various music programs in Korea. On July 14, the group finished promotions for "Ddu-Du Ddu-Du" and started promoting "Forever Young" as the second single from the EP and wrapped up their seven week long promotion on August 5 after performing on Inkigayo.

On August 17, it was announced that similar to "Blackpink Area", another pop-up store at BOK Gallery, Takeshita Street in Harajuku, Japan will be made public from August 22–26.

== Critical reception ==
Professional ratings
Review scores
Source	Rating
The 405	8/10

Square Up received generally favorable reviews from critics. Chase McMullen, writing for The 405, praised the album's "readymade hooks and airtight, bursting sonics" and its ability to go "from confrontational to blissfully ecstatic at the drop of a hat", proving Blackpink's mettle in the global K-pop boom. Billboard listed Square Up at number 20 in their list of the best K-pop albums of 2018, describing it as "a testament to their dedication to rambunctious, hip-hop infused dance music" that "[exuded] confidence, sass and an overpowering sense of chic." Refinery29 placed Square Up at number 8 at their best K-pop albums of 2018, saying that it "shimmers with signature Blackpink cheekiness and effortless swagger, momentarily satiating the fans who are waiting for more."

== Awards and nominations ==
Year	Award	Category	Result	Ref.
2018	10th Melon Music Awards	Album of the Year	Nominated	

== Commercial performance ==
In South Korea, the EP debuted at number one on Gaon Albums Chart, while "Ddu-Du Ddu-Du" debuted at number 3 on the Gaon Digital Chart and at number one on the Gaon Download Chart on the chart issue dated June 10–16, 2018 with 31,072,049 digital points. In its second week, "Ddu-Du Ddu-Du" peaked at number one on Digital, Download, Streaming, and Mobile Charts on Gaon with 85,411,467 digital points.

The EP debuted on the top spot of Japan's Oricon Weekly Digital Albums chart with 3,915 downloads. The lead single "Ddu-Du Ddu-Du" debuted as the highest-charting Hot 100 hit ever by an all-female K-pop act, opening at number 55 with 12.4 million US streams and 7,000 downloads sold in the tracking week ending June 21, 2018, according to Nielsen Music, also entering on the US Streaming Songs tally at number 39, where Blackpink became the first K-pop girl group to chart a title. The single also sat atop Billboard World Digital Songs, making it the group's fourth number one song on the chart. Square Up also brought the group their first entry on the US Billboard 200, debuting at number 40 with 14,000 album-equivalent units. The EP also topped the Billboard World Albums chart.

== Track listing ==
Square Up – Standard edition
No.	Title	Lyrics	Music	Arrangement	Length
1.	"Ddu-Du Ddu-Du" (뚜두뚜두)	Teddy	Teddy; 24; R. Tee; Bekuh Boom	Teddy; 24; R. Tee	3:29
2.	"Forever Young"	Teddy	Teddy; Future Bounce	Teddy; Future Bounce; R. Tee	3:57
3.	"Really"	Teddy; Danny Chung	Teddy; Choice37	Choice37	3:17
4.	"See U Later"	Teddy	Teddy; R. Tee; 24	R. Tee; 24	3:18
Total length:					14:03

Square Up – Physical edition hidden track
No.	Title	Lyrics	Music	Arrangement	Length
5.	"As If It's Your Last" (마지막처럼)	Teddy; Brother Su; Choice37	Teddy; Future Bounce; Lydia Paek	Teddy; Future Bounce	3:33
Total length:					17:36

== Charts ==
=== Weekly charts ===
Weekly chart performance for Square Up
Chart (2018)	Peak position
Australia (ARIA)	61
Austrian Albums (Ö3 Austria)	26
Canadian Albums (Billboard)	21
French Albums (SNEP)	125
Hungarian Albums (MAHASZ)	28
Japanese Albums (Oricon)	11
Japanese Digital Albums (Oricon)	1
Japanese Hot Albums (Billboard)	8
South Korean Albums (Gaon)	1
Swiss Albums (Schweizer Hitparade)	24
US Billboard 200	40
US Digital Albums (Billboard)	7
US Independent Albums (Billboard)	4
US World Albums (Billboard)	1

=== Monthly charts ===
Monthly chart performance for Square Up
Chart (2018)	Peak position
South Korean Albums (Gaon)	2

=== Year-end charts ===
2018 year-end chart performance for Square Up
Chart (2018)	Position
South Korean Albums (Gaon)	21
US World Albums (Billboard)	12

2019 year-end chart performance for Square Up
Chart (2019)	Position
South Korean Albums (Gaon)	89

== Certifications and sales ==
Certifications and sales for Square Up
Region	Certification	Certified units/sales
Japan	—	11,978
South Korea (KMCA)	2× Platinum	603,455

== Release history ==
Release dates and formats for Square Up
Region	Date	Format	Label(s)	Ref.
Various	June 15, 2018	Digital download; streaming	YG; YG Plus	
South Korea	June 20, 2018	CD	YG; Genie Music	
Japan	June 22, 2018	CD	YG; Genie Music	

== See also ==
- List of certified albums in South Korea
- List of Gaon Album Chart number ones of 2018
- List of K-pop albums on the Billboard charts
