= List of songs recorded by Blackpink =

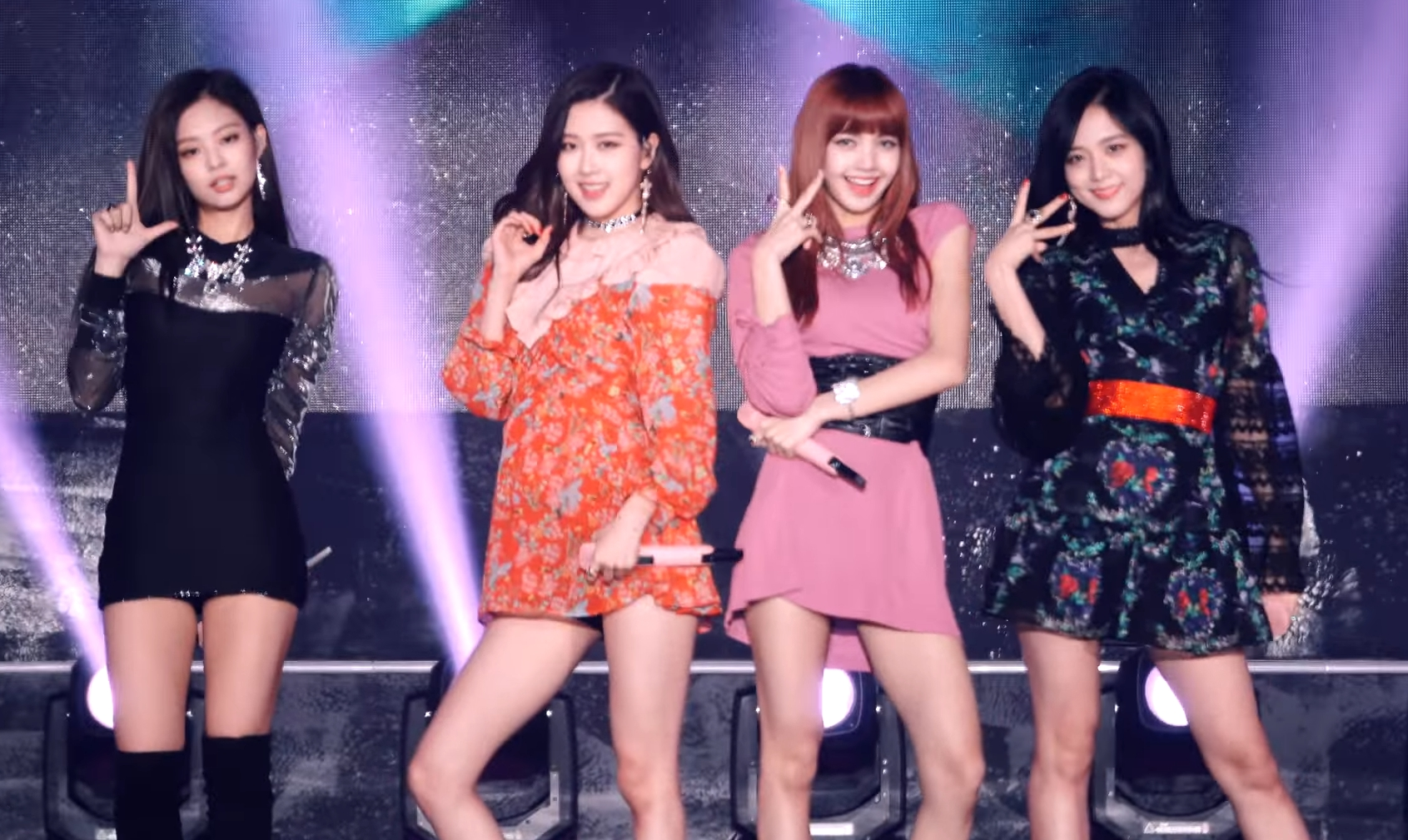
Blackpink in 2017

The following is a list of songs recorded by South Korean girl group Blackpink, consisting of the members Jisoo, Jennie, Rosé, and Lisa. As of February 2026, the girl group has officially released 37 songs, of which 21 songs were originally recorded in Korean and 16 were originally recorded in English. They have also released 17 Japanese versions of their Korean songs.

Key
†	Indicates a single release
#	Indicates a promotional single release

== Songs originally recorded in Korean ==
List of songs, showing year released, lyricist, composer, arranger, and originating album
Song	Year	Lyricist(s)	Composer(s)	Arranger(s)	Album	Ref.
"As If It's Your Last" (마지막처럼) (Note: The Japanese version was released as part of the EP Blackpink (2017).) †	2017	Teddy; Brother Su; Choice37	Teddy; Future Bounce; Lydia Paek	Future Bounce; Teddy	Non-album single	
"Boombayah" (붐바야) †	2016	Teddy; Bekuh Boom	Teddy; Bekuh Boom	Teddy	Square One	
"Ddu-Du Ddu-Du" (뚜두뚜두) (Note: The Japanese version was released as a physical single in 2018 and included on the album Blackpink in Your Area (2018).) †	2018	Teddy	Teddy; 24; R. Tee; Bekuh Boom	Teddy; 24; R. Tee	Square Up	
"Don't Know What to Do" (Note: The Japanese version was released as part of the album Kill This Love (JP Ver.) (2019).) #	2019	Teddy	Teddy; 24; Brian Lee; Bekuh Boom	Teddy; R. Tee; 24	Kill This Love	
"Forever Young" (Note: The Japanese version was released as part of the album Blackpink in Your Area (2018).) #	2018	Teddy	Teddy; Future Bounce	Teddy; Future Bounce; R. Tee	Square Up	
"Hope Not" (아니길)	2019	Teddy; Masta Wu	Teddy; Seo Won-jin; Lydia Paek	Seo Won-jin	Kill This Love	
"How You Like That" (Note: The Japanese version was released as a digital single in 2021 and included on the album The Album (JP Ver.) (2021).) †	2020	Teddy; Danny Chung	Teddy; R. Tee; 24	R. Tee; 24	The Album	
"Kick It"	2019	Teddy; Danny Chung; Taeo	Teddy; 24	24	Kill This Love	
"Kill This Love" †	2019	Teddy; Bekuh Boom	Teddy; 24; R. Tee; Bekuh Boom	Teddy; R. Tee; 24	Kill This Love	
"Lovesick Girls" †	2020	Teddy; Løren; Jisoo; Jennie; Danny Chung	Teddy; 24; Jennie; Brian Lee; R. Tee; Leah Haywood; David Guetta	24; R. Tee	The Album	
"Pink Venom" †	2022	Teddy; Danny Chung	Teddy; 24; R. Tee; Ido	24; R. Tee; Ido	Born Pink	
"Playing with Fire" (불장난) †	2016	Teddy	Teddy; R. Tee	R. Tee	Square Two	
"Pretty Savage"	2020	Teddy; Løren; Vince; Danny Chung	Teddy; R. Tee; 24; Bekuh Boom	Teddy; 24; R. Tee	The Album	
"Ready for Love" #	2022	Teddy; VVN	Teddy; VVN; 24; Kush; Bekuh Boom	24	Born Pink	
"Really"	2018	Teddy; Danny Chung	Teddy; Choice37	Choice37	Square Up	
"See U Later"	2018	Teddy	Teddy; R. Tee; 24	R. Tee; 24	Square Up	
"Shut Down" †	2022	Teddy; Danny Chung; Vince	Teddy; 24	24	Born Pink	
"Stay" †	2016	Teddy	Teddy; Seo Won-jin	Teddy; Seo Won-jin	Square Two	
"Whistle" (휘파람) †	2016	Teddy; Bekuh Boom; B.I.	Teddy; Future Bounce; Bekuh Boom	Teddy; Future Bounce	Square One	
"Yeah Yeah Yeah"	2022	VVN; Kush; Jisoo; Rosé	Kush; R. Tee; VVN; Ido	R. Tee; Kush; Ido	Born Pink	
"You Never Know"	2020	Løren; Bekuh Boom	24; Bekuh Boom	24	The Album	

== Songs originally recorded in English ==
List of songs, showing year released, lyricist, composer, arranger, and originating album
Song	Year	Lyricist(s)	Composer(s)	Arranger(s)	Album	Ref.
"Bet You Wanna" (featuring Cardi B)	2020	Tommy Brown; Steven Franks; Ryan Tedder; Melanie Joy Fontana; Belcalis Almanzar; Torae Carr; Jonathan Descartes	Tommy Brown; Mr. Franks	Tommy Brown; Mr. Franks; Teddy	The Album	
"Champion"	2026	Łukasz Gottwald; Theron Thomas; Ejae	Łukasz Gottwald; Theron Thomas; Ejae	Dr. Luke	Deadline	
"Crazy Over You"	2020	Teddy; Bekuh Boom; Danny Chung	Teddy; Bekuh Boom; 24; R. Tee; Future Bounce	24; R. Tee; Future Bounce	The Album	
"Fxxxboy"	2026	Zikai; Courtlin Jabrae Edwards; Tommy "TB Hits" Brown; Vince	Kush; Ido; Zikai; Courtlin Jabrae Edwards; Tommy "TB Hits" Brown	Teddy; Kush; Ido	Deadline	
"Go" †	2026	Chris Martin; Henry Walter; Rosé; Danny Chung; Jisoo; Jennie; Lisa	Henry Walter; Chris Martin; Rosé	Cirkut; Teddy; Chris Martin	Deadline	
"Hard to Love"	2022	Freddy Wexler; Bianca "Blush" Atterberry; Max Wolfgang; Teddy	Freddy Wexler; Teddy; Bianca "Blush" Atterberry; Max Wolfgang; 24; R. Tee	24; R. Tee	Born Pink	
"Ice Cream" † (with Selena Gomez)	2020	Bekuh Boom; Victoria Monét; Teddy	Tommy Brown; Mr. Franks; Teddy; Bekuh Boom; Victoria Monét; 24; Selena Gomez; Ariana Grande	Tommy Brown; Mr. Franks; 24	The Album	
"Jump" (뛰어) †	2025	Teddy; Zikai; Claudia Valentina; Jumpa; Malachiii; Jesse Bluu	Teddy; Diplo; 24; Zikai; Claudia Valentina; Jumpa; Malachiii; Jesse Bluu	Diplo; 24; Boaz van de Beatz; Zecca; Ape Drums	Deadline	
"Kiss and Make Up" # (with Dua Lipa)	2018	Chelcee Grimes; Dua Lipa; Marc Vincent; Mathieu Jomphe-Lepine; Teddy Parker; Yannick Rastogi; Zacharie Raymond	Chelcee Grimes; Dua Lipa; Marc Vincent; Mathieu Jomphe-Lepine; Teddy Parker; Yannick Rastogi; Zacharie Raymond	Banx & Ranx	Dua Lipa: Complete Edition	
"Love to Hate Me"	2020	Tushar Apte; Rob Grimaldi; Chloe George; Steph Jones; Danny Chung	Tushar Apte; Rob Grimaldi; 24	Tushar Apte; Rob Grimaldi; 24; Vince; Teddy	The Album	
"Me and My"	2026	Łukasz Gottwald; Theron Thomas; Vaughn Oliver; Tobias Wincorn; Rocco Valdes; Jelli Dorman	Łukasz Gottwald; Theron Thomas; Vaughn Oliver; Tobias Wincorn; Rocco Valdes	Dr. Luke; Vaughn Oliver; Tobias Wincorn	Deadline	
"Sour Candy" # (with Lady Gaga)	2020	Burns; BloodPop; Hong Jun Park; Lady Gaga; Madison Emiko Love; Rami Yacoub	Burns; BloodPop; Hong Jun Park; Lady Gaga; Madison Emiko Love; Rami Yacoub	Burns; BloodPop	Chromatica	
"Tally"	2022	Nat Dunn; David Phelan; Alex Oriet; Brian Lee; Soraya LaPread	Nat Dunn; David Phelan; Alex Oriet; Brian Lee; Soraya LaPread; 24	24	Born Pink	
"The Girls" †	2023	Ryan Tedder; Lindgren; Rosé; Jennie; Melanie Fontana; Madison Love; Danny Chung	Ryan Tedder; Lindgren; Rosé; Jennie; Melanie Fontana; Madison Love; Danny Chung	Ryan Tedder; Lindgren	Non-album single	
"The Happiest Girl"	2022	Teddy Sinclair; Willy Sinclair; Paro	Teddy Sinclair; Willy Sinclair; Paro; 24	24; Nohc	Born Pink	
"Typa Girl"	2022	Bekuh Boom	Bekuh Boom; Dominsuk	Dominsuk	Born Pink	

== See also ==
- Blackpink discography
