= Blackpink discography =

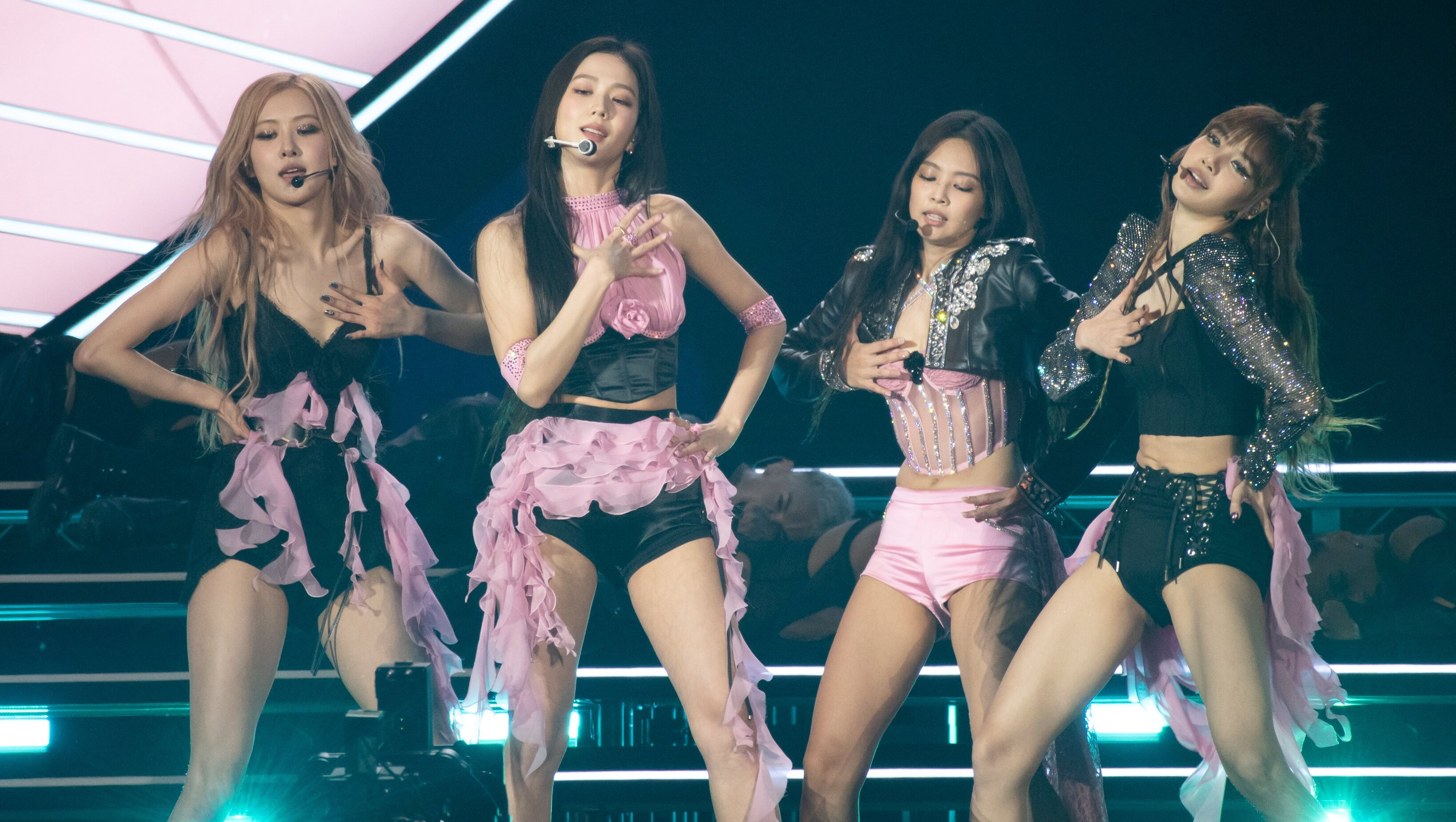
- Blackpink at Coachella 2023
- Studio albums: 2
- EPs: 4
- Live albums: 4
- Compilation albums: 1
- Singles: 15
- Reissues: 1
- Single albums: 5
- Promotional singles: 5

South Korean girl group Blackpink has released two studio albums, four extended plays, one reissue, one compilation album, four live albums, five single albums, fifteen singles and five promotional singles. They released their debut single album Square One on August 8, 2016, which included the songs "Whistle" and "Boombayah". "Whistle" debuted atop the Gaon Digital Chart and sold more than 2.5 million digital copies in South Korea, while "Boombayah" became the group's first number-one hit on the Billboard World Digital Song Sales chart. The group continued their success with the release of Square Two on November 1, which peaked at number 13 on the Billboard Top Heatseekers chart and number two on the World Albums chart. The single album included "Playing with Fire", which reached number three and sold more than 2.5 million digital copies in South Korea. On June 22, 2017, Blackpink released the single "As If It's Your Last", which also peaked at number three and reached 2.5 million certified downloads in South Korea. On August 30, the group made their Japanese debut with the EP Blackpink, which featured Japanese-language versions of the group's existing tracks. The EP was a commercial success, debuting atop the Oricon Albums Chart and selling over 80,000 copies in Japan.

On June 15, 2018, the group released their first Korean EP, Square Up, which debuted atop the Gaon Album Chart and was certified 2× platinum for selling 500,000 copies. It debuted at number 40 on the US Billboard 200, becoming their first entry and the highest-charting album by a female Korean act. The EP spawned the number-one single "Ddu-Du Ddu-Du", which was certified 2× platinum for streaming and platinum for downloads in South Korea. It was the group's first song to enter the US Billboard Hot 100 at number 55, making them the highest-charting female Korean act and the first to be certified gold in the country. On October 19, the group collaborated with British singer Dua Lipa for the track "Kiss and Make Up", achieving commercial success worldwide. On November 23, the group released the Japanese compilation album Blackpink in Your Area, which included Japanese versions of all their tracks. Blackpink's second Korean EP Kill This Love was released on April 5, 2019; it was certified 2× platinum for selling 500,000 copies and debuted at number 24 on the Billboard 200, making them the highest-charting female Korean act on the chart. The EP's lead single of the same name peaked at number two on the Gaon Digital Chart and number 41 on the Billboard Hot 100, extending their record for the highest-charting and longest-charting single by a female Korean act on the latter.

On June 26, 2020, Blackpink released "How You Like That" as a pre-release single from their debut studio album The Album. The song topped the Gaon Digital Chart and debuted at number 33 on the Billboard Hot 100, tying with the group's collaboration with American singer Lady Gaga, "Sour Candy", as the highest-charting songs by a female Korean act. Its physical version debuted at number one on the Gaon Album Chart, selling over 350,000 copies. The group subsequently released the second pre-release single "Ice Cream" featuring American singer Selena Gomez on August 28, which peaked at number 13 on the Billboard Hot 100, becoming the highest-charting as well as the longest-charting song by a female Korean act. On October 2, The Album was released alongside title track “Lovesick Girls", which peaked at number two on both the Billboard Global 200 and the Gaon Digital Chart. The album debuted at number one on the Gaon Album Chart and broke the record for the best-selling album by a Korean female act of all time, selling over 1 million copies in its first month. It also debuted at number two on the Billboard 200, becoming the highest-charting album by a female Korean act and the highest-charting album by a girl group since 2008.

On August 19, 2022, Blackpink released the pre-release single "Pink Venom" from their second studio album Born Pink. The song became their first number-one single on the Billboard Global 200, and peaked at number two on the Circle Digital Chart and number 22 on the Billboard Hot 100. Born Pink was released on September 16, alongside the track "Shut Down", which was their second single to top the Billboard Global 200 and peaked at number three on the Circle Digital Chart and number 25 on the Billboard Hot 100. The album debuted at number one on the Circle Album Chart with 2.2 million copies sold in the first two days, breaking the record for the best-selling album by a Korean female act of all time. It debuted at number one on the Billboard 200, the first album by a female Korean act to do so and the first album by a girl group to do so since 2008. It also debuted at number one on the UK Albums Chart, becoming the first number-one album by a K-pop girl group. On July 11, 2025, Blackpink released the single "Jump", which became their third number-one song on the Billboard Global 200 and their tenth entry on the Billboard Hot 100 at number 28.

== Albums ==
=== Studio albums ===
List of studio albums, with selected details, selected chart positions, sales, and certifications
Title	Details	Peak chart positions										Sales	Certifications (Note: In April 2018, the Korea Music Content Association introduced music recording certifications for albums and singles.)
Title	Details	KOR	AUS	CAN	FRA	GER	JPN	NZ	POL	UK	US	Sales	Certifications
The Album	Released: October 2, 2020; Released: August 3, 2021 (JPN); Label: YG, Interscope, Universal; Formats: CD, LP, DVD, cassette, digital download, streaming	1	2	5	11	7	3 (Note: The Korean version of The Album peaked at 4, and the Japanese version peaked at 3.)	1	4	2	2	KOR: 1,817,117; JPN: 66,862 (Note: Japanese sales of The Album: Physical sales of The Album: 28,554; Digital sales of The Album: 3,929; Physical sales of The Album – JP Ver.: 34,379); UK: 5,700 (Note: Disclosed UK sales figure for cassette format.); US: 117,000; WW: 1,510,000	KMCA: Million; BPI: Gold; MC: Gold; RMNZ: Gold; SNEP: Gold; ZPAV: Platinum
Born Pink	Released: September 16, 2022; Label: YG, Interscope; Formats: CD, Kit, LP, cassette, digital download, streaming	1	2	1	3	3	3	2	3	1	1	KOR: 3,085,115; JPN: 34,475 (Note: Japanese sales of Born Pink: Physical sales: 31,385; Digital sales: 3,090); US: 101,500	KMCA: 2× Million; BPI: Silver; RMNZ: Gold; SNEP: Platinum; ZPAV: Platinum

=== Compilation albums ===
List of compilation albums, with selected details, selected chart positions, and sales
Title	Details	Peak chart positions		Sales
Title	Details	JPN	JPN Hot	Sales
Blackpink in Your Area	Released: December 5, 2018; Label: YGEX; Formats: CD, DVD, digital download, streaming	9	12	JPN: 22,464

=== Live albums ===
List of live albums, with selected details, selected chart position, and sales
Title	Details	Peak chart positions	Sales
Title	Details	KOR	Sales
Blackpink Arena Tour 2018 "Special Final In Kyocera Dome Osaka"	Released: March 22, 2019; Label: YGEX; Formats: CD, DVD, digital download, streaming	—	
Blackpink 2018 Tour 'In Your Area' Seoul	Released: August 30, 2019; Label: YG, Interscope; Formats: CD, DVD, digital download, streaming	—	
Blackpink 2019–2020 World Tour in Your Area – Tokyo Dome	Released: May 14, 2020; Label: Universal, Interscope; Formats: CD, DVD, digital download, streaming	—	
Blackpink 2021 'The Show' Live	Released: June 1, 2021; Label: YG, Interscope; Formats: CD, DVD, digital download, streaming	8	KOR: 34,906
"—" denotes a recording that did not chart or was not released in that territory.

== Extended plays ==
=== Korean extended plays ===
List of Korean extended plays, with selected details, selected chart positions, sales, and certifications
Title	Details	Peak chart positions										Sales	Certifications
Title	Details	KOR	AUS	CAN	FRA	JPN	NZ	SWI	UK	US	US World	Sales	Certifications
Square Up	Released: June 15, 2018; Label: YG; Formats: CD, digital download, streaming	1	61	21	125	11	—	24	—	40	1	KOR: 607,235; JPN: 11,978 (Note: Japanese sales of Square Up: Physical sales: 6,419; Digital sales: 5,559)	KMCA: 2× Platinum
Kill This Love	Released: April 5, 2019; Released: October 16, 2019 (JPN); Label: YG, Interscope, Universal; Formats: CD, digital download, streaming	3	18	8	—	5 (Note: The Korean version of Kill This Love peaked at 17, and the Japanese version peaked at 5.)	10	—	40	24	1	KOR: 865,862; JPN: 29,040 (Note: Japanese sales of Kill This Love: Physical sales of Kill This Love: 8,846; Digital sales of Kill This Love: 3,531; Physical sales of Kill This Love – JP Ver.: 15,836; Digital sales of Kill This Love – JP Ver.: 827); US: 9,100	KMCA: 3× Platinum
Deadline	Released: February 27, 2026; Label: YG; Formats: CD, digital download, streaming	1	30	25	2	9	12	6	11	8	—	KOR: 1,988,245; JPN: 14,784 (Note: Japanese sales of Deadline: Physical sales: 13,844; Digital sales: 940); US: 41,000	KMCA: Million; SNEP: Gold
"—" denotes a recording that did not chart or was not released in that territory.

=== Japanese extended plays ===
List of Japanese extended plays, with selected details, selected chart positions, and sales
Title	Album details	Peak chart positions		Sales
Title	Album details	JPN	JPN Hot	Sales
Blackpink	Released: August 30, 2017; Repackaged: March 28, 2018; Label: YGEX; Formats: CD, DVD, digital download, streaming	1	1	JPN: 60,668

== Single albums ==
=== Korean single albums ===
List of Korean single albums, with selected details, selected chart positions, sales, and certifications
Title	Details	Peak chart positions			Sales	Certifications
Title	Details	KOR	US Heat.	US World	Sales	Certifications
Square One	Released: August 8, 2016; Label: YG; Formats: Digital download, streaming	—	—	—		
Square Two	Released: November 1, 2016; Label: YG; Formats: Digital download, streaming	—	13	2	US: 7,000	
How You Like That	Released: July 17, 2020; Label: YG, Interscope; Formats: CD, digital download, streaming	1	—	—	KOR: 357,522	KMCA: Platinum
The Girls	Released: August 25, 2023; Label: YG, TakeOne; Formats: Cassette, digital download, streaming	1	—	—	KOR: 191,610	
"—" denotes a recording that did not chart or was not released in that territory.

=== Japanese single albums ===
List of Japanese single albums, with selected details, selected chart position, and sales
Title	Details	Peak chart positions	Sales
Title	Details	JPN	Sales
Ddu-Du Ddu-Du	Released: August 22, 2018; Label: YGEX; Formats: CD, DVD, digital download, streaming	7	JPN: 29,388

== Singles ==
=== As lead artist ===
List of singles, with year released, selected chart positions, sales, certifications, and album name
Title	Year	Peak chart positions										Sales (Note: Korean sales are paid digital downloads, previously weekly, monthly and annually provided by the Circle Digital Chart. In 2018, Circle replaced detailed downloads and streaming numbers with the Circle Digital Index. Sales are now monthly reported on the 'Observation Board' if a song reaches a specific milestone. Japanese sales are digital single sales, provided by Oricon.)	Certifications	Album
Title	Year	KOR	AUS	CAN	FRA	JPN Hot	NZ	SGP	UK	US	WW	Sales	Certifications	Album
"Whistle" (휘파람)	2016	1	—	—	—	—	—	—	—	—	— (Note: "Whistle" did not enter the Billboard Global 200, but peaked at number 2 on the World Digital Song Sales chart.)	KOR: 2,500,000; US: 6,000	RMNZ: Gold	Square One
"Boombayah" (붐바야)	2016	7	—	—	196	15	—	—	—	—	— (Note: "Boombayah" did not enter the Billboard Global 200, but peaked at number 1 on the World Digital Song Sales chart.)	KOR: 605,048; US: 6,000	BPI: Silver; RIAJ: Gold (Note: Streaming certification for Japanese version); RIAJ: Gold (Note: Streaming certification for Korean version); RMNZ: Gold	Square One
"Playing with Fire" (불장난)	2016	3	—	92	—	81	—	—	—	—	— (Note: "Playing With Fire" did not enter the Billboard Global 200, but peaked at number 1 on the World Digital Song Sales chart.)	KOR: 2,500,000; US: 4,000	RIAJ: Gold (Note: Streaming certification for Korean version); RMNZ: Gold	Square Two
"Stay"	2016	10	—	—	—	—	—	—	—	—	— (Note: "Stay" did not enter the Billboard Global 200, but peaked at number 4 on the World Digital Song Sales chart.)	KOR: 243,508; US: 3,000		Square Two
"As If It's Your Last" (마지막처럼)	2017	3	—	45	— (Note: "As If It's Your Last" did not enter the SNEP Top Singles Chart, but peaked at number 181 on the SNEP Top Downloaded Singles Chart.)	19	— (Note: "As If It's Your Last" did not enter the NZ Top 40 Singles Chart, but peaked at number three on the NZ Heatseekers Singles Chart.)	—	— (Note: "As If It's Your Last" did not enter the UK Singles Chart, but peaked at number 45 on the UK Independent Singles Chart.)	— (Note: "As If It's Your Last" did not enter the Billboard Hot 100, but peaked at number 13 on the Bubbling Under Hot 100 chart.)	— (Note: "As If It's Your Last" did not enter the Billboard Global 200, but peaked at number 1 on the World Digital Song Sales chart.)	KOR: 2,500,000; US: 9,000	BPI: Silver; RIAJ: Platinum (Note: Streaming certification for Korean version); RIAJ: Platinum (Note: Streaming certification for Japanese version); RMNZ: Gold	Non-album single
"Ddu-Du Ddu-Du" (뚜두뚜두)	2018	1	— (Note: Due to its short length, the EP Square Up ranked at number 61 on the singles chart, but "Ddu-Du Ddu-Du" was not recognised separately.)	22	— (Note: "Ddu-Du Ddu-Du" did not enter the SNEP Top Singles Chart, but peaked at number 95 on the SNEP Top Downloaded Singles Chart.)	7	— (Note: "Ddu-Du Ddu-Du" did not enter the NZ Top 40 Singles Chart, but peaked at number two on the NZ Heatseekers Singles Chart.)	1	78	55	158	KOR: 2,500,000; US: 7,000	KMCA: 2× Platinum (Note: Streaming certification); KMCA: Platinum (Note: Download certification); ARIA: Platinum; BPI: Silver; RIAA: Gold; RIAJ: Platinum (Note: Streaming certification); RMNZ: Platinum; SNEP: Platinum	Square Up
"Kill This Love"	2019	2	— (Note: Due to its short length, the EP Kill This Love ranked at number 18 on the singles chart, but the single was not recognised separately.)	11	126	6	24	13	33	41	181	JPN: 8,604; US: 7,000	KMCA: Platinum; ARIA: Platinum; BPI: Silver; RIAJ: Platinum (Note: Streaming certification); RMNZ: Platinum; SNEP: Platinum	Kill This Love
"How You Like That"	2020	1	12	11	78	8	14	1	20	33	24	JPN: 11,106; US: 16,400	KMCA: Platinum; ARIA: Platinum; BPI: Gold; MC: 2× Platinum; RIAJ: Platinum (Note: Streaming certification); RMNZ: Platinum; SNEP: Platinum	The Album
"Ice Cream" (with Selena Gomez)	2020	8	16	11	135	22	18	2	39	13	8	US: 23,000	ARIA: Platinum; BPI: Silver; MC: Platinum; RIAJ: Gold (Note: Streaming certification); RMNZ: Gold	The Album
"Lovesick Girls"	2020	2	27	29	130	12	35	1	40	59	2	WW: 17,000	KMCA: Platinum; ARIA: Gold; RIAJ: Platinum (Note: Streaming certification); RMNZ: Gold	The Album
"Pink Venom"	2022	2	1	4	44	10	9	1	22	22	1	JPN: 7,438; US: 11,000; WW: 46,000	KMCA: Platinum; ARIA: Gold; BPI: Silver; MC: Platinum; RIAJ: Gold (Note: Streaming certification); RMNZ: Platinum; SNEP: Gold	Born Pink
"Shut Down"	2022	3	5	7	51	15	6	1	24	25	1	JPN: 1,554; US: 4,000; WW: 17,000	KMCA: Platinum; ARIA: Gold; BPI: Silver; MC: Platinum; RIAJ: Gold (Note: Streaming certification); RMNZ: Gold; SNEP: Gold	Born Pink
"The Girls"	2023	— (Note: "The Girls" did not enter the Circle Digital Chart, but peaked at number 34 on the Circle Download Chart.)	—	—	—	—	— (Note: "The Girls" did not enter the NZ Top 40 Singles Chart, but peaked at number 10 on the NZ Hot 40 Singles Chart.)	16	— (Note: "The Girls" did not enter the UK Singles Chart, but peaked at number 57 on the UK Singles Downloads Chart.)	— (Note: "The Girls" did not enter the Billboard Hot 100, but peaked at number 39 on the Digital Song Sales chart.)	69			Non-album single
"Jump" (뛰어)	2025	2	12	19	15	8	13	1	18	28	1	JPN: 10,262; US: 3,600; WW: 14,000	ARIA: Platinum; BPI: Silver; MC: Platinum; RIAA: Gold; RIAJ: Gold (Note: Streaming certification); RMNZ: Gold; SNEP: Diamond	Deadline
"Go"	2026	10	— (Note: Due to its short length, the EP Deadline ranked at number 30 on the singles chart, but "Go" was not recognised separately.)	50	65	42	— (Note: "Go" did not enter the NZ Top 40 Singles Chart, but peaked at number 7 on the NZ Hot 40 Singles Chart.)	3	44	63	17			Deadline
"—" denotes a recording that did not chart or was not released in that territory.

=== Promotional singles ===
List of promotional singles, with year released, selected chart positions, sales, certifications, and album name
Title	Year	Peak chart positions										Sales	Certifications	Album
Title	Year	KOR	AUS	CAN	JPN Hot	MLY	NZ	SGP	UK	US	WW	Sales	Certifications	Album
"Forever Young"	2018	2	—	—	36	5	— (Note: "Forever Young" did not enter the NZ Top 40 Singles Chart, but peaked at number 10 on the NZ Hot 40 Singles Chart.)	3	—	—	— (Note: "Forever Young" did not enter the Billboard Global 200, but peaked at number 4 on the World Digital Song Sales chart.)	KOR: 2,500,000	KMCA: Platinum; KMCA: Platinum; RIAJ: Gold (Note: Streaming certification)	Square Up
"Kiss and Make Up" (with Dua Lipa)	2018	75	33	44	90	1	32	1	36	93	—	US: 11,000	ARIA: Platinum; BPI: Gold; RMNZ: Platinum	Dua Lipa: Complete Edition
"Don't Know What to Do"	2019	38	—	—	49	2	— (Note: "Don't Know What to Do" did not enter the NZ Top 40 Singles Chart, but peaked at number 11 on the NZ Hot 40 Singles Chart.)	—	—	—	— (Note: "Don't Know What to Do" did not enter the Billboard Global 200, but peaked at number 4 on the World Digital Song Sales chart.)		ARIA: Gold	Kill This Love
"Sour Candy" (with Lady Gaga)	2020	178	8	18	43	1	12	1	17	33	—	US: 7,000	ARIA: Gold; BPI: Silver; MC: Gold; RIAA: Gold; RMNZ: Gold	Chromatica
"Ready for Love"	2022	52	—	—	—	— (Note: "Ready for Love" did not enter the Official Malaysia Chart, but peaked at number 10 on the Billboard Malaysia Songs chart.)	—	12	—	—	60			Born Pink
"—" denotes a recording that did not chart or was not released in that territory.

== Other charted songs ==
List of other charted songs, with year released, selected chart positions, certifications, and album name
Title	Year	Peak chart positions										Certifications	Album
Title	Year	KOR	KOR Billb. (Note: Includes the Billboard K-pop Hot 100 (discontinued between July 16, 2014 and June 4, 2017 and since April 30, 2022), the South Korea Songs chart (launched on May 7, 2022 and discontinued since January 18, 2025), and the Billboard Korea Hot 100 (launched on December 6, 2025).)	AUS	CAN	HK	MLY	NZ Hot	SGP	US World	WW	Certifications	Album
"Whistle" (휘파람; acoustic version)	2016	88	—	—	—	—	—	—	—	—	—		Square Two
"Really"	2018	18	8	—	—	—	14	—	10	11	—		Square Up
"See U Later"	2018	26	10	—	—	—	19	—	14	12	—		Square Up
"Kick It"	2019	89	89	—	—	—	5	17	—	8	—		Kill This Love
"Hope Not" (아니길)	2019	108	—	—	—	—	7	20	—	9	—		Kill This Love
"Ddu-Du Ddu-Du" (뚜두뚜두; remix)	2019	— (Note: "Ddu-Du Ddu-Du" (remix) did not enter the Circle Digital Chart, but peaked at number 100 on the Circle Download Chart.)	—	—	—	—	—	—	—	—	—		Kill This Love
"Pretty Savage" (Note: Japanese version of the song was released as a single to digital music stores.)	2020	45	36	71	87	—	2	8	3	2	32	ARIA: Gold; RMNZ: Gold	The Album
"Bet You Wanna" (featuring Cardi B)	2020	34	14	42	58	—	4	4	4	—	25		The Album
"Crazy Over You"	2020	106	50	—	—	—	8	13	8	—	49		The Album
"Love to Hate Me"	2020	80	48	—	—	—	7	—	10	—	54		The Album
"You Never Know"	2020	101	51	—	—	—	5	—	7	4	64		The Album
"Lovesick Girls" (live)	2021	— (Note: "Lovesick Girls" (live) did not enter the Circle Digital Chart, but peaked at number 189 on the Circle Download Chart.)	—	—	—	—	—	—	—	—	—		Blackpink 2021 'The Show' Live
"Typa Girl"	2022	93	20	57	51	9	— (Note: "Typa Girl" did not enter the Official Malaysia Chart, but peaked at number three on the Billboard Malaysia Songs chart.)	4	3	— (Note: "Typa Girl" did not enter the World Digital Song Sales chart, but peaked at number 49 on the Digital Song Sales chart.)	16		Born Pink
"Yeah Yeah Yeah"	2022	53	—	—	85	18	— (Note: "Yeah Yeah Yeah" did not enter the Official Malaysia Chart, but peaked at number seven on the Billboard Malaysia Songs chart.)	—	7	9	43		Born Pink
"Hard to Love"	2022	87	22	65	68	12	— (Note: "Hard to Love" did not enter the Official Malaysia Chart, but peaked at number four on the Billboard Malaysia Songs chart.)	6	5	—	27		Born Pink
"The Happiest Girl"	2022	89	—	—	81	14	— (Note: "The Happiest Girl" did not enter the Official Malaysia Chart, but peaked at number five on the Billboard Malaysia Songs chart.)	9	6	—	34		Born Pink
"Tally"	2022	141	—	—	90	21	— (Note: "Tally" did not enter the Official Malaysia Chart, but peaked at number six on the Billboard Malaysia Songs chart.)	—	8	—	52		Born Pink
"Me and My"	2026	168	—	—	—	21	19	12	24	—	119		Deadline
"Champion"	2026	90	76	—	—	10	4	11	7	—	76		Deadline
"Fxxxboy"	2026	— (Note: "Fxxxboy" did not enter the Circle Digital Chart, but peaked at number 32 on the Circle Download Chart.)	—	—	—	15	—	15	26	—	— (Note: "Fxxxboy" did not enter the Billboard Global 200, but peaked at number 116 on the Billboard Global Excl. US.)		Deadline
"—" denotes a recording that did not chart or was not released in that territory.

== See also ==
- Jisoo § Discography
- Jennie discography
- Rosé discography
- Lisa (rapper) discography
- List of artists who have achieved simultaneous UK and U.S. number-one hits
- List of artists who reached number one on the Australian singles chart
- List of K-pop on the Billboard charts
