= Rosé discography =

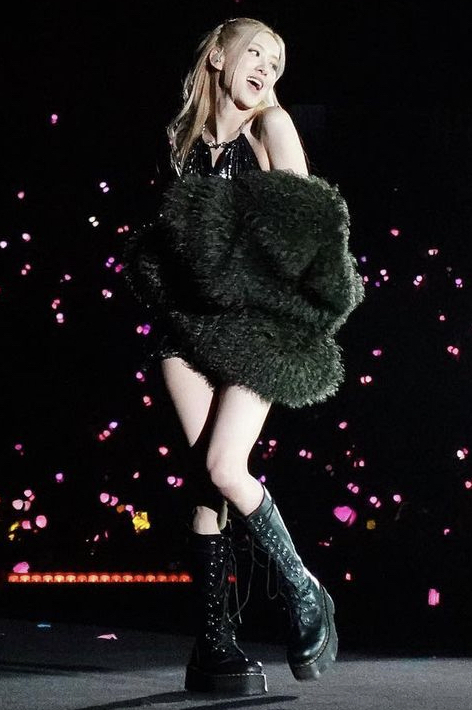
- Rosé performing in 2022
- Studio albums: 1
- Singles: 8
- Music videos: 8
- Single albums: 1

New Zealand and South Korean singer and songwriter Rosé has released one studio album, one single album, and eight singles.

Rosé began her career as a member of girl group Blackpink in August 2016. She released her debut solo single album R through YG Entertainment and Interscope Records in March 2021. It debuted at number two on the Circle Album Chart in South Korea and was certified triple platinum for surpassing 750,000 copies sold. The album's lead single "On the Ground" was the first song by a K-pop solo artist to reach number one on the Billboard Global 200 and Global Excl. US charts. It peaked at number four on South Korea's Circle Digital Chart, topped the charts in Malaysia and Singapore, and became the highest-charting song at the time by a female K-pop soloist on the US Billboard Hot 100, the Canadian Hot 100, and the UK Singles Chart and is certified gold in New Zealand. The second single from R, "Gone", peaked at number six on the Circle Digital Chart and number one in Malaysia.

In 2024, Rosé signed with The Black Label and Atlantic Records and released "APT.", a collaboration with Bruno Mars and the lead single of her debut studio album, Rosie (2024). It became her second number-one single on the Billboard Global 200 and Global Excl. US and topped charts in numerous countries including New Zealand, Malaysia, Singapore, and South Korea. It became the first song by a female K-pop soloist to reach number one on Australia's ARIA Singles Chart and the top ten on the UK Singles Chart at number two. It was also the first song by a female K-pop act to enter the top five of the US Billboard Hot 100, peaking at number three. Rosie debuted at number two on the Circle Album Chart and was certified double platinum for surpassing 500,000 copies sold in South Korea as well as gold in New Zealand. It also debuted at number three on the US Billboard 200 and number four on the UK Albums Chart, becoming the highest-ranked album by a female K-pop soloist on both charts.

== Albums ==
=== Studio albums ===
List of studio albums, with selected details, selected chart positions, sales, and certifications
Title	Details	Peak chart positions										Sales	Certifications
Title	Details	KOR	NZ	AUS	CAN	FRA	GER	JPN	SWI	UK	US	Sales	Certifications
Rosie	Released: 6 December 2024; Label: The Black Label, Atlantic; Formats: CD, LP, cassette, digital download, streaming	2	3	2	4	16	8	10	8	4	3	KOR: 654,747; JPN: 25,278 (Note: Japanese sales of Rosie: Physical sales: 22,294; Digital sales: 2,984); US: 82,000	KMCA: 2× Platinum; RMNZ: Platinum; BPI: Silver; MC: Gold; SNEP: Gold

== Single albums ==
List of single albums, with selected details, selected chart positions, sales, and certifications
Title	Details	Peak chart positions				Sales	Certifications
Title	Details	KOR	CRO	JPN Cmb.	UK Phy.	Sales	Certifications
R	Released: 12 March 2021; Label: YG, Interscope; Formats: CD, LP, digital download, streaming	2	10	40	4	KOR: 1,031,970	KMCA: 3× Platinum

== Singles ==
List of singles, with year released, selected chart positions, sales, certifications, and album name
Title	Year	Peak chart positions										Sales	Certifications	Album
Title	Year	KOR	NZ	AUS	CAN	MLY	SGP	TWN	UK	US	WW	Sales	Certifications	Album
"On the Ground"	2021	4	— (Note: "On the Ground" did not enter the NZ Top 40 Singles Chart, but peaked at number 15 on the NZ Top 20 Aotearoa Singles Chart.)	31	35	1	1	—	43	70	1	US: 7,500; WW: 29,000	RMNZ: Gold	R
"Gone"	2021	6	— (Note: "Gone" did not enter the NZ Top 40 Singles Chart, but peaked at number 18 on the NZ Top 20 Aotearoa Singles Chart.)	63	77	1	2	—	— (Note: "Gone" did not enter the UK Singles Chart, but peaked at number 41 on the UK Singles Sales Chart.)	— (Note: "Gone" did not enter the Billboard Hot 100, but peaked at number 15 on the Digital Song Sales chart.)	29	WW: 25,000		R
"APT." (with Bruno Mars)	2024	1	1	1	1	1	1	1	2	3	1	US: 29,100; WW: 272,000	KMCA: Platinum; RMNZ: 5× Platinum; ARIA: 8× Platinum; BPI: 3× Platinum; MC: 9× Platinum; RIAA: 5× Platinum	Rosie
"Number One Girl"	2024	12	— (Note: "Number One Girl" did not enter the NZ Top 40 Singles Chart, but peaked at number 3 on the NZ Top 20 Aotearoa Singles Chart.)	61	63	3	4	2	84	— (Note: "Number One Girl" did not enter the Billboard Hot 100 but peaked at number 1 on the Bubbling Under Hot 100 chart.)	29		ARIA: Gold	Rosie
"Toxic Till the End"	2024	4	— (Note: "Toxic Till the End did not enter the NZ Top 40 Singles Chart, but peaked at number 3 on the NZ Top 20 Aotearoa Singles Chart.)	31	54	3	2	2	72	90	15	WW: 4,000	KMCA: Platinum; RMNZ: Gold; ARIA: Platinum; MC: Gold	Rosie
"Messy"	2025	96	— (Note: "Messy" did not enter the NZ Top 40 Singles Chart, but peaked at number 5 on the NZ Top 20 Aotearoa Singles Chart.)	84	71	6	6	2	100	— (Note: "Messy" did not enter the Billboard Hot 100 but peaked at number 9 on the Bubbling Under Hot 100 chart.)	34			F1 the Album
"On My Mind" (with Alex Warren)	2025	— (Note: "On My Mind" did not enter the Circle Digital Chart, but peaked at number 38 on the Circle Download Chart.)	— (Note: "On My Mind" did not enter the NZ Top 40 Singles Chart, but peaked at number 10 on the NZ Hot 40 Singles Chart.)	91	60	—	—	—	37	60	57		MC: Gold	You'll Be Alright, Kid
"New Trick"	2026	82	— (Note: "New Trick" did not enter the NZ Top 40 Singles Chart, but peaked at number 11 on the NZ Top 20 Aotearoa Singles Chart.)	—	—	—	10	3	— (Note: "New Trick" did not enter the UK Singles Chart, but peaked at number 21 on the UK Singles Sales Chart.)	— (Note: "New Trick" did not enter the Billboard Hot 100 but peaked at number 10 on the Bubbling Under Hot 100 chart.)	179			Non-album single
"—" denotes a recording that did not chart or was not released in that territory.

== Other charted songs ==
List of other charted songs, with year released, selected chart positions, sales, and album name
Title	Year	Peak chart positions										Sales	Album
Title	Year	KOR	NZ Aot.	AUS	CAN	HK	MLY	PHL Hot (Note: Includes Billboard Philippines Songs (discontinued since June 29, 2024) and the subsequent Billboard Philippines Hot 100 (relaunched in July 6, 2024).)	SGP	TWN	WW	Sales	Album
"Without You" (결국) (G-Dragon featuring Rosé) (Note: Credited as "? of YG New Girl Group" at the time of the release.)	2012	10	—	—	—	—	—	—	—	—	—	KOR: 646,074	One of a Kind
"Hard to Love" (Note: Credited under Blackpink but is a solo track performed by Rosé.)	2022	87	— (Note: "Hard to Love" did not enter the NZ Top 20 Aotearoa Singles Chart, but peaked at number 6 on the NZ Hot 40 Singles Chart.)	65	68	12	—	7	5	13	27		Born Pink
"3am"	2024	79	13	—	—	18	11	84	14	19	165		Rosie
"Two Years"	2024	84	17	—	—	17	9	95	13	21	183		Rosie
"Drinks or Coffee"	2024	83	11	—	—	15	10	73	12	20	151		Rosie
"Gameboy"	2024	77	18	—	—	19	15	—	20	25	177		Rosie
"Stay a Little Longer"	2024	88	20	—	—	20	13	94	18	—	198		Rosie
"Not the Same"	2024	116	—	—	—	—	—	—	—	—	—		Rosie
"Call It the End"	2024	107	—	—	—	—	—	—	—	—	—		Rosie
"Too Bad for Us"	2024	115	—	—	—	—	—	—	—	—	—		Rosie
"Dance All Night"	2024	114	—	—	—	—	—	—	—	—	—		Rosie
"—" denotes a recording that did not chart or was not released in that territory.

== Songwriting credits ==
All song credits are adapted from the Korea Music Copyright Association and American Society of Composers, Authors and Publishers databases, unless otherwise noted.

List of songs, with year released, artist name, and album name
Year	Artist	Song	Album	Lyricist		Composition	
Year	Artist	Song	Album	Credited	With	Credited	With
2021	Rosé	"On the Ground"	R	Yes	Amy Allen, Jon Bellion, Jorgen Odegard, Raul Cubina, Teddy	Yes	Amy Allen, Jon Bellion, Jorgen Odegard, Raul Cubina, Teddy
2021	Rosé	"Gone"	R	Yes	Brian Lee, J. Lauryn, Teddy	Yes	Brian Lee, J. Lauryn, Teddy
2022	Blackpink	"Yeah Yeah Yeah"	Born Pink	Yes	VVN, Kush, Jisoo	No	N/A
2023	Blackpink	"The Girls"	Non-album single	Yes	Danny Chung, Jennie, Madison Love, Melanie Fontana, Michel Schulz, Ryan Tedder	Yes	Danny Chung, Jennie, Madison Love, Melanie Fontana, Michel Schulz, Ryan Tedder
2024	Rosé	"Number One Girl"	Rosie	Yes	Amy Allen, Bruno Mars, Dernst Emile II, Carter Lang, Dylan Wiggins, Omer Fedi	Yes	Amy Allen, Bruno Mars, Dernst Emile II, Carter Lang, Dylan Wiggins, Omer Fedi
2024	Rosé	"3AM"	Rosie	Yes	Amy Allen, Jacob Weinberg, Raul Cubina, Mark Williams	Yes	Amy Allen, Jacob Weinberg, Raul Cubina, Mark Williams
2024	Rosé	"Two Years"	Rosie	Yes	Gregory Aldae Hein, Michael Pollack, Isaiah Tejada, Jordan K. Johnson, Stefan Johnson	Yes	Gregory Aldae Hein, Michael Pollack, Isaiah Tejada, Jordan K. Johnson, Stefan Johnson
2024	Rosé	"Toxic Till the End"	Rosie	Yes	Michael Pollack, Emily Warren, Evan Blair	Yes	Michael Pollack, Emily Warren, Evan Blair
2024	Rosé	"Drinks or Coffee"	Rosie	Yes	Amy Allen, Omer Fedi, Carter Lang, Dylan Wiggins, Blake Slatkin	Yes	Amy Allen, Omer Fedi, Carter Lang, Dylan Wiggins, Blake Slatkin
2024	Rosé and Bruno Mars	"APT."	Rosie	Yes	Bruno Mars, Amy Allen, Christopher Brody Brown, Henry Walter, Michael Chapman, Nicholas Chinn, Omer Fedi, Phillip Lawrence, Rogét Chahayed, Theron Thomas	Yes	Bruno Mars, Amy Allen, Christopher Brody Brown, Henry Walter, Michael Chapman, Nicholas Chinn, Omer Fedi, Phillip Lawrence, Rogét Chahayed, Theron Thomas
2024	Rosé	"Gameboy"	Rosie	Yes	Amy Allen, Rob Bisel, Raul Cubina, Gregory Aldae Hein, Mark Williams	Yes	Amy Allen, Rob Bisel, Raul Cubina, Gregory Aldae Hein, Mark Williams
2024	Rosé	"Stay a Little Longer"	Rosie	Yes	Sarah Aarons, Andrew Wells	Yes	Sarah Aarons, Andrew Wells
2024	Rosé	"Not the Same"	Rosie	Yes	Amy Allen, Rob Bisel, Raul Cubina, Mark Williams	Yes	Amy Allen, Rob Bisel, Raul Cubina, Mark Williams
2024	Rosé	"Call It the End"	Rosie	Yes	Elof Loelv, Michael Pollack, Emily Warren, Griff Clawson	Yes	Elof Loelv, Michael Pollack, Emily Warren, Griff Clawson
2024	Rosé	"Too Bad for Us"	Rosie	Yes	Jason Evigan, Wayne Hector, Gian Stone, Freddy Wexler, Ben Fielding, Dean Ussher	Yes	Jason Evigan, Wayne Hector, Gian Stone, Freddy Wexler, Ben Fielding, Dean Ussher
2024	Rosé	"Dance All Night"	Rosie	Yes	Maureen MacDonald, Greg Kurstin	Yes	Maureen MacDonald, Greg Kurstin
2024	Rosé	"Vampirehollie"	Rosie	Yes	Amy Allen, Henry Walter, Omer Fedi	Yes	Amy Allen, Henry Walter, Omer Fedi
2025	Rosé	"Messy"	F1 the Album	Yes	Cleo Tighe, Delacey, Peter Rycroft, Matthew James Burns	Yes	Cleo Tighe, Delacey, Peter Rycroft, Matthew James Burns
2025	Alex Warren and Rosé	"On My Mind"	You'll Be Alright, Kid	Yes	Alex Warren, Alexander Izquierdo, John Ryan, Joshua Coleman	Yes	Alex Warren, Alexander Izquierdo, John Ryan, Joshua Coleman
2026	Blackpink	"Go"	Deadline	Yes	Jennie, Jisoo, Lisa, Chris Martin, Henry Walter, Danny Chung	Yes	Chris Martin, Henry Walter
2026	Rosé	"New Trick"	Non-album single	Yes	Andrew Wells, Amy Allen	Yes	Andrew Wells, Amy Allen

== Music videos ==
Title	Year	Director(s)	Length	Ref.
"On the Ground"	2021	Han Sa-min	3:09	
"Gone"	2021	Kwon Yong-soo	3:41	
"APT." (with Bruno Mars)	2024	Daniel Ramos and Bruno Mars	2:53	
"Number One Girl"	2024	Rosé	3:38	
"Toxic Till the End"	2024	Ramez Silyan	3:54	
"Messy"	2025	Colin Tilley	3:05	
"On My Mind" (with Alex Warren)	2025	Colin Tilley	3:41	
"New Trick"	2026	Dave Meyers	3:01	

== See also ==
- Blackpink discography
- List of artists who reached number one on the Australian singles chart
- List of artists who reached number one on the Canadian Hot 100
- List of artists who reached number one on the Japan Hot 100
- List of artists who reached number one on the UK Singles Downloads Chart
- List of artists who reached number one on the U.S. Pop Airplay chart
- List of K-pop on the Billboard charts
