= Tally (song) =

2022 song by Blackpink

Song by Blackpink

from the album Born Pink
- Released: September 16, 2022
- Recorded: The Black Label (Seoul)
- Genre: Pop rock
- Length: 3:04
- Label: YG; Interscope
- Composers: Nat Dunn; David Phelan; Alex Oriet; Brian Lee; Soraya LaPread; 24
- Lyricists: Nat Dunn; David Phelan; Alex Oriet; Brian Lee; Soraya LaPread

Audio video
- "Tally" on YouTube

"Tally" is a song recorded by South Korean girl group Blackpink. It is the seventh track on group's second studio album, Born Pink (2022), which was released on September 16, 2022, through YG and Interscope. The track was composed by its writers Nat Dunn, David Phelan, Alex Oriet, Brian Lee, and Soraya LaPread, as well as 24. "Tally" is a rock-based pop song with lyrics that comprise an unapologetic message promoting female empowerment and sexual liberation.

"Tally" was subject to generally positive reviews from music critics for its bold message and personal lyrics, and has been described by Blackpink as a meaningful song in their discography. The song peaked at number 52 on the Billboard Global 200 and was a top-ten hit in Malaysia, the Philippines, Singapore and Vietnam.

== Background ==
On July 31, 2022, YG Entertainment officially released the album trailer video on the group's official social media accounts, announcing that the group's new world tour would start in October, following a pre-release single in August and the album itself in September. "Tally" was announced as the seventh track of Born Pink on September 7, 2022, through the group's official social media accounts. The song was released alongside the album on September 16, 2022, by YG and Interscope.

== Development and recording ==
"Tally" was written by Nat Dunn, David Phelan and Alex Oriet of the production duo Saltwives, Brian Lee, and Soraya LaPread, and composed by them alongside 24. LaPread described coming up with its concept in a session with Dunn and Saltwives at the latter's house. Seeking to create a song with a rock element, they formed the song's melody and guitar backing first, drawing from 1980s punk music, after which the hook came naturally. LaPread brought up the subject of the song, having been inspired by a discussion in which her friend talked about having relations with multiple men and uttered "no one's keeping tally on my pussy," which developed into the song's final hook. After the session, the track remained in the vault for years, and LaPread confessed she had actually forgotten about it. However, Australian songwriter Nat Dunn later expressed interest in the track and shopped the song to various artists, including Bebe Rexha and Doja Cat. Dunn played the demo for Brian Lee in London, who saw the potential and contributed to the song, advising that the "melody has to pull on your heartstrings in the pre-chorus."

Lee eventually played "Tally" to producer Teddy Park, who handpicked the song for Blackpink's album Born Pink. The track was not intended with the K-pop group in mind, and Lee was surprised to find out that the song had made it on their album. In an interview with Variety, the songwriters agreed that Blackpink was the right choice for the song's feminist message, with Dunn stating, "Judgment is something that a lot of women come across. These lyrics are so impactful coming from them," and Saltwives agreeing, "We can’t imagine an act who better embodies its [defiant] message than Blackpink." The final version of the song was recorded by Blackpink at The Black Label in Seoul, South Korea. "Tally" is performed in the key of D major with a tempo of 130 beats per minute in common time.

== Lyrics and production ==
"Tally" is a midtempo pop ballad that incorporates rock and hip-hop elements and features a punk guitar tone in the introduction. The song is an anthem for female empowerment and sexual liberation that speaks out against the judgement and double standards that women face for being themselves. In the opening line, Rosé boldly proclaims that they do not care about others' opinion and will do as they please: "I say fuck it when I feel it, ‘cause no one’s keeping tally I do what I want with who I like./ I ain’t gonna conceal it, when you’re talking all that shit I’ll be getting mine." They continue to express their freedom with lyrics such as Jennie's line, "Sometimes, I like to go play dirty/ Just like all the fuck boys do/ That’s my choice," flipping the double standards that the girl group and many other women have faced throughout their careers. Later, Jisoo decries onlookers' intense focus on their looks and body with, "My body don’t belong to none of them though/ And I’m not going to change ’cause you say so," in which she declares that their beauty isn't for the pleasure of anyone but themselves. The expletive-filled song and its daring message marked a more mature direction for Blackpink compared to their previous releases, and was seen as a ground-breaking move for a band in the more restrictive K-pop industry.

In an interview with Dua Lipa on her BBC Sounds podcast Dua Lipa: At Your Service, Blackpink member Jennie expressed "Tally" was one of her favorite songs to perform and explained how it related to the expectations she faced as a K-pop idol, stating: "Starting my career in Korea as a K-pop artist has restricted so many sides of me, where it wasn’t just allowed to be shown because I’m a K-pop idol [...] And as things grew, over time, I was able to express myself and people would see it as breaking the boundaries rather than ‘she’s doing something that she’s not allowed to do’ and being able to open a new chapter for people that are starting in the business in Korea. That's when I realized I want to break more boundaries for people in my culture." She specifically discussed "Tally" as a meaningful song in the group's journey, explaining that it "was one of the first songs that we actually say the F-word. And at first when I started performing the song, I couldn’t even say it out loud. I was like, 'oh can I move away from the mic?' Do people think this is like, not right? And then more fans were loving the song and I was connecting with Blinks. While I was on stage when I was singing that song, they were like, ‘yeah, do your thing.’ And they were the ones who gave me my confidence and support to really enjoy the song." Jennie described how she gained the confidence to express herself on stage from the group's fans, named Blinks, and how Blackpink's headlining set at Coachella, which contained "Tally" in the setlist, was an emotional experience, resulting in her first time crying afterwards due to the overwhelming support she received from the crowd.

== Critical reception ==
Jeff Benjamin from Billboard ranked "Tally" as the third best song on the album. He praised the "savage" lyrics speaking out against the double standards and beauty standards placed on Blackpink as K-pop idols, describing it as "revolutionary in K-pop lyricism." Writing for Rolling Stone, Rob Sheffield named the song one of the "best bangers" on the album and praised the punk guitar introduction and the bold opening line for being attention-grabbing. Park Jun-hee of The Korea Herald commended the song for "infusing a fresh sound to Blackpink's musical vessel" and predicted that it "will likely have a special place in people’s hearts." He noted that all four members had moments to shine on the song, but highlighted Jisoo in particular for delivering one of her best performances, including her ability to drop expletives as well as convey sadness.

Vince Ferreras from CNN Philippines called "Tally" a prime example of Blackpink's new level of maturity in the album, and praised it as "an empowering anthem for girls." In her review for AllMusic, Neil Z. Yeung approved of the song's honest and relatable lyrics as "refreshing" and an impressive change of pace from the "typical K-pop sanitizing" expected in the music from K-pop groups. The Harvard Crimson's Alisa S. Regassa praised the production for taking its stripped electric guitar loop and elevating it "into something modern and deeply nostalgic with the complex layering of swelling violins."

On the other hand, Tanu I. Raj from NME saw potential in the song's hip-hop and rock production but was disappointed by the lyrics, which she believed fell short of being "anthemic and empowering" as intended. Likewise, Sputnikmusic's Raul Stanciu compared the song to Red Velvet's "Psycho" and felt that the song lacked a strong hook. Benedetta Geddo of The Mary Sue felt that it sounded "middle range" and deemed it one of the two worst tracks from Born Pink, along with "Ready for Love".

== Commercial performance ==
"Tally" debuted at number 52 on the Billboard Global 200 and at number 35 on the Billboard Global Excl. U.S. chart. In South Korea, the song debuted at number 173 and peaked at number 141 on the Circle Digital Chart. It also peaked within the top ten on Billboard's Philippines Songs, Malaysia Songs, and the Vietnam Hot 100, as well as the RIAS top streaming chart.

== Live performances ==
Blackpink included "Tally" on the set list of their Born Pink World Tour (2022–23). In April and June 2023, Blackpink performed the song during their headlining sets at the Coachella Valley Music and Arts Festival in Indio, California and BST Hyde Park in London.

== Credits and personnel ==
Credits adapted from the liner notes of Born Pink.

Recording

- Recorded at The Black Label Studio (Seoul)
- Mixed at Gudwin Music Group Inc
- Mastered at Sterling Sound (New York City)

Personnel

- Blackpink – vocals
- Nat Dunn – lyricist, composer
- David Phelan – lyricist, composer
- Alex Oriet – lyricist, composer
- Brian Lee – lyricist, composer
- Soraya LaPread – lyricist, composer
- 24 – composer, arranger
- Youngju Bang – recording engineer
- Josh Gudwin – mixing engineer
- Chris Gehringer – mastering engineer

== Charts ==
Chart performance for "Tally"
Chart (2022–2023)	Peak position
Canada Hot 100 (Billboard)	90
Global 200 (Billboard)	52
Hong Kong (Billboard)	21
Hungary (Single Top 40)	23
Indonesia (Billboard)	12
Malaysia (Billboard)	6
Philippines (Billboard)	4
Singapore (RIAS)	8
South Korea (Circle)	141
Taiwan (Billboard)	15
Vietnam Hot 100 (Billboard)	8

== See also ==
- List of K-pop songs on the Billboard charts
