= Yeah Yeah Yeah (Blackpink song) =

2022 song by Blackpink

Song by Blackpink

from the album Born Pink
- Language: Korean; English
- Released: September 16, 2022
- Recorded: The Black Label (Seoul)
- Genre: Pop rock; synth-pop
- Length: 2:58
- Label: YG; Interscope
- Composers: Kush; R.Tee; VVN; Ido
- Lyricists: VVN; Kush; Jisoo; Rosé

Audio video
- "Yeah Yeah Yeah" on YouTube

"Yeah Yeah Yeah" is a song recorded by South Korean girl group Blackpink. It is the fourth track on the group's second studio album, Born Pink, which was released on September 16, 2022, through YG and Interscope. The track was written by Kush, Jisoo and Rosé, while the composition was handled by Kush, VVN, R.Tee and Ido. "Yeah Yeah Yeah" is a pop-rock and synth-pop love song with lyrics about the apprehension and pain of falling in love again.

Critics gave "Yeah Yeah Yeah" positive reviews; those complimentary praised the synth-disco production and dubbed it as the highlight on the album. "Yeah Yeah Yeah" peaked at number 43 on the Billboard Global 200, number nine on the US World Digital Song Sales chart, and was a top-ten hit in the Philippines, Malaysia, Singapore and Vietnam.

== Background ==
On July 31, 2022, YG Entertainment officially released the album trailer video on the group's official social media accounts, announcing that the group's new world tour would start in October, following a pre-release single in August and the album itself in September. "Yeah Yeah Yeah" was announced as the fourth track of Born Pink on September 7, 2022, through the group's official social media accounts. It was further revealed that both Jisoo and Rosé participated in the writing of the song.

== Lyrics and production ==
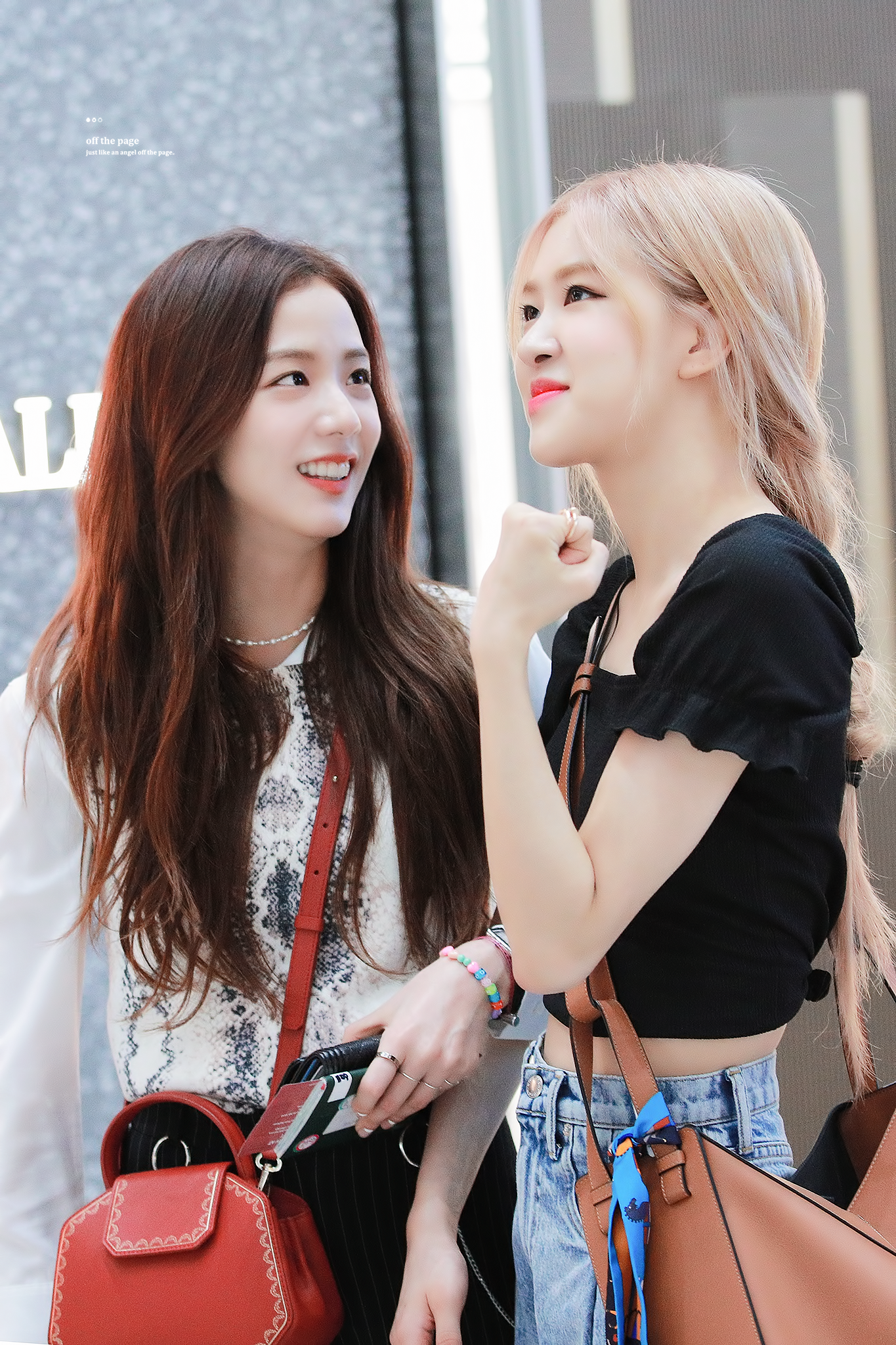
"Yeah Yeah Yeah" features songwriting contributions from Blackpink members Jisoo (left) and Rosé (right).

During a listening party on Stationhead, Rosé shared how "fun" it was to write "Yeah Yeah Yeah" with member Jisoo, since they were "singing in front of a computer" and "brainstorming ideas" about "what’s this fun scenario that we could be writing about?". Blackpink's vocals were recorded at The Black Label in Seoul, South Korea, while the track's production was handled by VVN, Kush, R.Tee and Ido. "Yeah Yeah Yeah" is performed in the key of C♯ minor with a tempo of 124 beats per minute in common time.

"Yeah Yeah Yeah" is a pop-rock and synth-pop love song that incorporates additional pop elements, typical of the 1980s synth-disco sound. Described as new wave-esque by AllMusic, the song is a retro synths-driven track with a jagged, minimalist guitar riff and a bouncy, soaring dance breakdown in the chorus. In the lyrics, Blackpink explore the apprehension and pain of falling in love again with someone completely unexpected. They keep hesitating: "What is this again? I don’t even know myself/ Why did you show up? What is it that I keep remembering", but ultimately want the lover to "just say yeah yeah yeah". Many critics compared its "light but upbeat" sound to the group's songs "Lovesick Girls", "Playing with Fire" and "Forever Young".

== Critical reception ==
"Yeah Yeah Yeah" received positive reviews in the press. Writing for Rolling Stone, Rob Sheffield compared the track to Kelly Clarkson's "Since U Been Gone" and The Cars' "Let's Go" and named it the "killer" track on the album. Tanu I. Raj from NME called the song "a neat callback to 2020's "Lovesick Girls", with a "smooth" and "easy" synth-pop sound. In Sputnikmusic, Raul Stanciu described it as the lightest track on Born Pink, while "dropping their usual shtick, aiming on delivering a lush love song instead". Jeff Benjamin from Billboard compared it as "the brighter follow-up" to the group's 2016 single "Playing with Fire", with an "undeniable dance breakdown in the chorus". Pitchfork's Alex Ramos stated that it represents the album's "first splash of soft and vulnerable" side of the group's "pink" part.

== Commercial performance ==
"Yeah Yeah Yeah" debuted at number 43 on the Billboard Global 200 and at number 27 on the Billboard Global Excl. U.S. chart. In South Korea, the song debuted at number 103 and peaked at number 53 on the Circle Digital Chart. In the United States, the song did not enter the Billboard Hot 100, but did peak at number nine on the Billboard World Digital Song Sales chart. It also entered in the top ten on Billboard's Philippines Songs and Malaysia Songs, as well as the Billboard Vietnam Hot 100.

== Release and promotion ==
"Yeah Yeah Yeah" is track number four on Born Pink, which was released in various countries on September 16, 2022, by YG and Interscope. Blackpink included the song on the set list of their Born Pink World Tour (2022–23) as a part of the encore. The song was also used as the background music in their practice video from October 13, 2022, for the tour. It shows the group heading to a studio, accompanied by a guitarist, bassist, drummer and keyboard player.

== Credits and personnel ==
Credits adapted from the liner notes of Born Pink.

Recording

- Recorded at The Black Label Studio (Seoul)
- Mixed at Gudwin Music Group Inc
- Mastered at Sterling Sound (New York City)

Personnel

- Blackpink – vocals
  - Jisoo – lyricist
  - Rosé – lyricist
- VVN – lyricist, composer
- Kush – lyricist, composer, arranger
- R.Tee – composer, arranger
- Ido – composer, arranger
- Youngju Bang – recording engineer
- Josh Gudwin – mixing engineer
- Chris Gehringer – mastering engineer

== Charts ==
=== Weekly charts ===
Weekly chart performance for "Yeah Yeah Yeah"
Chart (2022)	Peak position
Canada Hot 100 (Billboard)	85
Global 200 (Billboard)	43
Hong Kong (Billboard)	18
Hungary (Single Top 40)	16
Indonesia (Billboard)	21
Malaysia (Billboard)	7
Philippines (Billboard)	8
Singapore (RIAS)	7
South Korea (Circle)	53
US World Digital Song Sales (Billboard)	9
Vietnam Hot 100 (Billboard)	7

=== Monthly charts ===
Monthly chart performance for "Yeah Yeah Yeah"
Chart (2022)	Peak position
South Korea (Circle)	108

== See also ==
- List of K-pop songs on the Billboard charts
