= Born Pink =

- Digital and Kit physical cover

Studio album by Blackpink
- Released: September 16, 2022
- Recorded: 2020–2022
- Studio: The Black Label (Seoul)
- Genres: Pop; hip-hop; rock; EDM
- Length: 24:34
- Languages: English; Korean
- Labels: YG; Interscope
- Producers: Teddy Park; 24; Freddy Wexler; Nohc; Paro

Blackpink chronology
Blackpink 2021 'The Show' Live (2021)	Born Pink (2022)	Deadline (2026)

Singles from Born Pink
- 1. "Pink Venom" Released: August 19, 2022; 2. "Shut Down" Released: September 16, 2022

Born Pink is the second studio album by South Korean girl group Blackpink. It was released on September 16, 2022, through YG Entertainment and Interscope Records. It marked the group's first full-length record since The Album in 2020 and their final release under Interscope. Production of the album was handled by various producers including Teddy Park, 24, Freddy Wexler, Nohc, and Paro. Blackpink conceived Born Pink as "the essence" of the group, taking inspiration from hip-hop and combining various genres.

Born Pink's English-heavy sound draws mostly from pop, hip-hop, rock, and EDM, with melodies characterized by more uptempo production than in its predecessor The Album. The songs incorporate eclectic styles ranging from disco and bubblegum pop to pop-rock and stadium rock. Lyrically, the album discusses themes of love, self-confidence, self-encouragement, dealing with fame and detractors, and more. Blackpink members Jisoo and Rosé co-wrote the fourth track "Yeah Yeah Yeah".

Born Pink was supported by two singles, both of which reached number one on the Billboard Global 200. The pre-release single "Pink Venom" topped the national charts of 10 countries, peaking at number two on South Korea's Circle Digital Chart and at number 22 on the US Billboard Hot 100. The album's second single "Shut Down" peaked at number three on the Circle Digital Chart and at number 25 on the Billboard Hot 100. "Ready for Love", previously released as a promotional single in collaboration with battle royale video game PUBG Mobile, was also included on the tracklist. To promote the album, Blackpink embarked on the Born Pink World Tour beginning in October, which broke the record for the highest-grossing concert tour by a female group.

The album was met with mixed reviews from critics. The album's stronger production and more personal lyrics received praise; however, criticisms were made for its lack of innovation and musical development. Commercially, it debuted at number one on the Circle Album Chart with 2.2 million copies sold in less than two days, becoming the best-selling album by a female act in South Korea and the first to surpass two million sales. In the United States, it became the first album by a female group to reach number one on the Billboard 200 since Danity Kane in 2008. Additionally, Born Pink became the first album by a K-pop girl group to land atop the Billboard 200 and the UK Albums Chart, which earned Blackpink two Guinness World Records. The album has since been certified double million by the Korea Music Content Association (KMCA), gold by Recorded Music NZ (RMNZ), and silver by the British Phonographic Industry (BPI). According to the International Federation of the Phonographic Industry (IFPI), the album was the eighth best-selling album worldwide across all formats in 2022, and the seventh best-selling album in pure sales.

== Background ==
On March 7, 2022, Jennie appeared on the variety show The Game Caterers in an episode featuring YG Entertainment artists, revealing that Blackpink had been working on their new album: "Blackpink is also making a comeback soon. I don't know if I'm allowed to say this, but since I'm the only Blackpink member here, I'll just say it: please look forward to it". In a Rolling Stone interview published on May 23, 2022, Blackpink said that "they were working hard on the preparation of the album and that they were ready to comeback into the swing of things."

In collaboration with battle royale video game PUBG Mobile, "Ready for Love" was released as a promotional single, with an animated music video published on YouTube on July 29, 2022. On July 31, 2022, YG Entertainment officially released the album trailer video on the group's official social media accounts, announcing that the group's new world tour would start in October, following a pre-release single in August and the album itself in September. The label later confirmed that two music videos were filmed to support the album, reportedly with the highest production budgets they have ever invested into a music video. The album's pre-release single, "Pink Venom", was released on August 19. The same day, Blackpink performed the single at the 2022 MTV Video Music Awards, marking their American awards show debut and making them the first female K-pop group in history to do so.

On September 6, 2022, the teaser poster for the title track, "Shut Down", was released on Blackpink's social media accounts. On September 7, the album's eight-song track list was released. It was further revealed that both Jisoo and Rosé helped write "Yeah Yeah Yeah". From September 10 to 13, promotional posters of each of the members were released. On September 16, the album was released alongside the music video for "Shut Down".

== Recording and development ==
"As always, working with the members was fun. From the beginning of the concept meeting to the last moment of recording, new ideas were continuously pouring in. By examining each other's thoughts and feelings in more detail, we were able to bring out something deep inside. We exchanged feedback with each other and realized that the four of us shine the most when we are together. Above all, it was so reassuring and fun to work with YG producers who know us well. I am very satisfied because it seems to be filled with works created by sharing musical synergy."

— Jennie looking back on recording Born Pink, Newsen

In an interview with Newsen, Rosé stated, "If The Album focused solely on music, this album tried to express the essence of Blackpink as its title 'Born Pink', where we keep trying new things while keeping our original identity." Furthermore, she added: "Based on the hip-hop sound throughout the album, various genres were combined, focusing on expressing the light color of Blackpink. I pride myself on creating music that we've never done before". Regarding the creative process and style for the songs, YG Entertainment stated after that "a lot of music that is Blackpink-esque has been completed with much effort over a long period of time", and that the new album was expected to include numerous tracks that "feature the band's signature music style that the members have worked on for a very long time". The label further explained that the album's title Born Pink "portrays Blackpink's confidence and self-esteem for being born different" and that the album lives up to the group's reputation and "unrivaled presence".

In an online press conference in Seoul for the release of "Pink Venom", Jennie explained how the single was chosen to represent Blackpink's identity: "Since our album's title is Born Pink, we wanted to relay our identity in the song as much as we could. Since 'pink' and 'venom' have contradicting images, we thought they were kind of reminiscent of us." During the group's live stream broadcast for Born Pink, Lisa shared the group's first impression of "Shut Down" and how they chose it to be the album's second single: "We listened to the demo version of 'Shut Down' in the studio, and when we first heard it, we exchanged looks and knew that this had to be the title track. I was able to sketch how we'd perform this song". She also revealed that the track is "distinctly Blackpink" and is something the band can express well.

In an article by Variety, several songwriters whose work was featured on Born Pink discussed the stories behind their contributions to the record. The writer of "Typa Girl", Bekuh Boom revealed that she had written the demo for the song in 2021 at The Black Label's studio and that she had originally "thought Lisa might use it for her next solo single". She further described it as a "song to empower women". American songwriter and producer Freddy Wexler conceived "Hard to Love" during a jam session with his friends. He sent the demo to Teddy in June 2022, who video called him the next day along with Lisa and Rosé. He described the song as "an overwhelmingly organic — and fast — process". Over the next month, he would FaceTime with Park and the group, who suggested changes.

The writers of "Tally" discussed the story behind the track: "Judgment is something that a lot of women come across. These lyrics are so impactful coming from [BLACKPINK]". The song was inspired by co-writer Soraya LaPread, who brought up the subject in a session with production duo Saltwives. During the interview with Rolling Stone, LaPread confessed she worked on the song years ago and had actually forgotten about it. The producer then revealed that she only remembered the song after Australian songwriter Nat Dunn showed interest in the track and offered to buy it. He played the demo for Brian Lee in London and later sent it to Teddy Park, who had handpicked every song on the album. Prior to its release, the recording process of "Ready for Love" was shown in the Netflix documentary, Light Up the Sky in October 2020, as it was cut from The Album's final tracklist.

Record producer Ryan Tedder, who last worked with Blackpink on their debut studio album, confirmed in an interview with Good Morning America that he wrote songs with members Jennie and Rosé for the upcoming album. Describing the process, Tedder said it was very much Blackpink's work with him supporting and contributing. Despite working on several songs, none of them made the final album tracklisting, however, one of the tracks, "The Girls", was later released as the official soundtrack to Blackpink: The Game on August 23, 2023.

== Music and lyrics ==
=== Composition ===
Born Pink is twenty-four minutes long and consists of 8 songs. Three of the album's tracks are labelled explicit. It features genres such as hip-hop, pop, disco, ballad, alt-pop, pop-rock, stadium rock, punk, EDM, bubblegum pop and classical interludes. Blackpink worked with many producers, including Teddy Sinclair, Willy Sinclair, Bekuh Boom, R.Tee, Kush and Teddy Park. The first half of the album contains lyrics that show the group's "extremely confident" and "untouchable exteriors", while the second half reveals the insecurities in "emotionally charged" ballads. The uptempo, "English heavy" album was described as "faster" and "shinier" than its predecessor The Album.

=== Songs ===
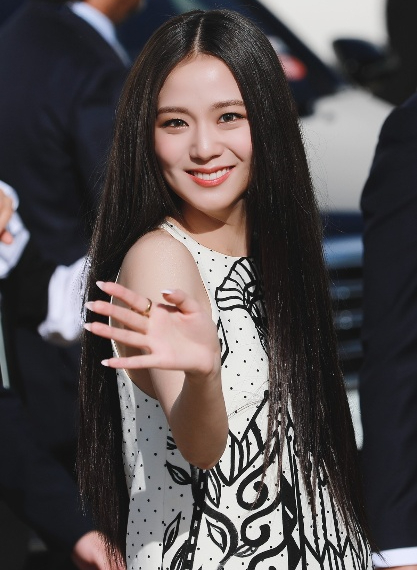
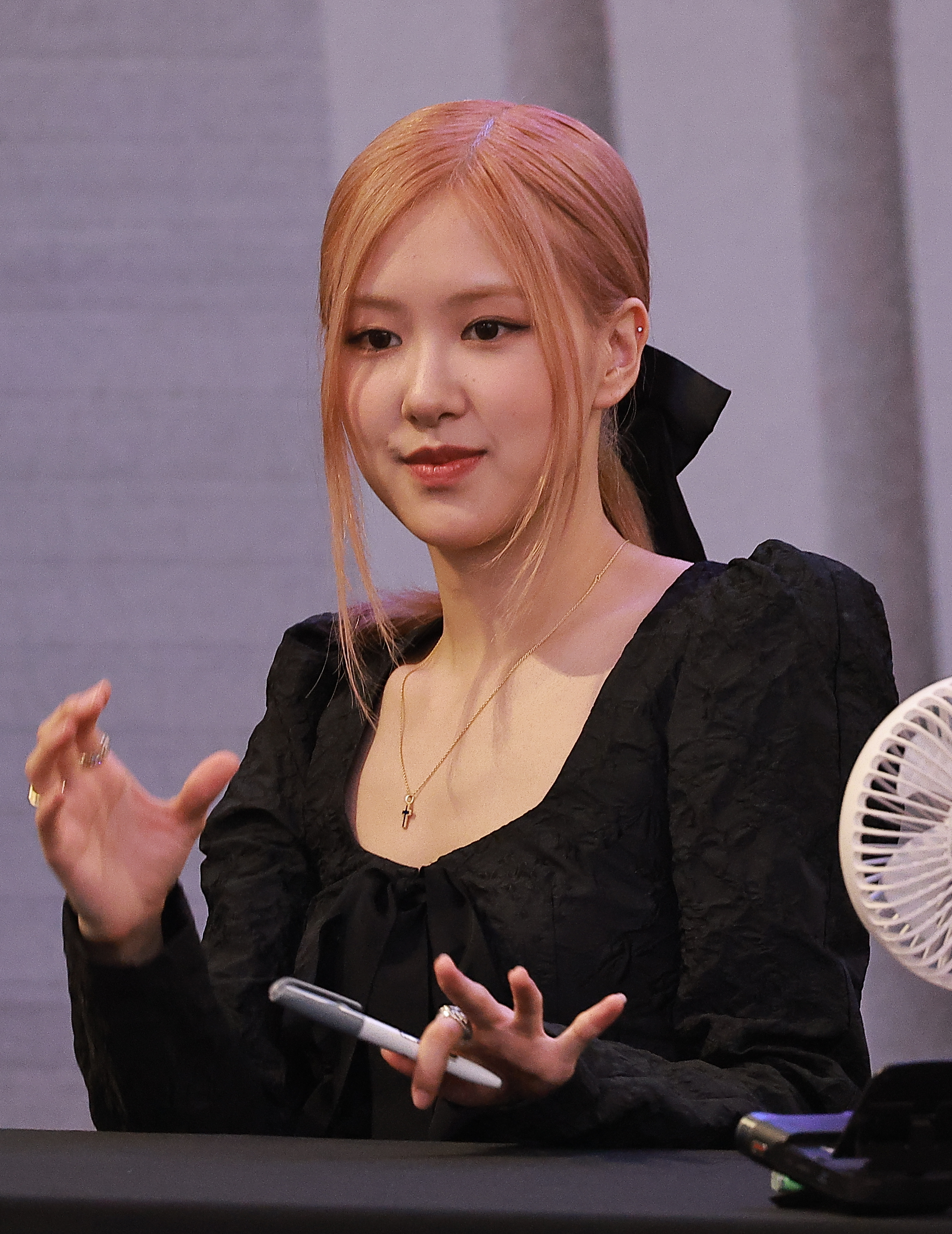
"Yeah Yeah Yeah", the fourth track on Born Pink, features writing credits from Blackpink members Jisoo and Rosé.

The record opens with the pre-release single, "Pink Venom", a hip-hop based track that blends elements of traditional Korean instruments with EDM, pop-rap and Middle Eastern influences. Lyrically, it expresses Blackpink's confidence and dual identity as both sweet and deadly and the group's growing international popularity. The song includes several lyrical references from the 1990s and 2000s: Jennie opens the first verse with "Kick the door, waving the Coco", a play on the lyric "Kick in the door, wavin' the .44" from the Notorious B.I.G.'s "Kick in the Door", while one of Lisa's verses interpolates the lyrics "One by one, then two by two" from Rihanna's debut single "Pon de Replay". "Shut Down" samples the classical composition "La campanella", originally by Niccolò Paganini, mixed with hip-hop and trap hooks, strings and an insistent bass sound. Lyrically it contains self-referential lyrics about the group's fame and success, while telling "their haters and doubters to take a seat". Longtime collaborator Bekuh Boom primarily wrote and produced the third track "Typa Girl", an electronic hip-hop and pop song with a trap beat and strong 1980s sound that speaks "confidently" about being the "type" of person everyone wants and highlights "the potential of a different kind of music".

Members Jisoo and Rosé participated in the writing process for the fourth track, the pop-rock, synth-pop and new wave "lush" love song "Yeah Yeah Yeah", which features retro synths in its arrangement and recalls 1980s music in its composition. The song's production "rides on a jagged guitar riff with lavish flourishes of over-the-top synth-disco." Park Jun-hee of The Star noted that "The disco-style tune that gives off '80s vibes enters the 50-second mark and sketches out a euphoric moment of young love and youthful energy. It reminds us of spending summer nights with a lover under the bright light of the moon". Many critics compared its production to the group's 2020 single "Lovesick Girls". In the lyrics, Blackpink explore the apprehension and pain of falling in love again with someone completely unexpected. Singer-songwriter Freddy Wexler contributed to the composition of the fifth track, "Hard to Love", as co-writer and co-producer, performed by member Rosé as a solo. The guitar pop track incorporates elements of 90's rock and roll, is led by soft piano and a "vintage intro that contrasts with the powerful rhythm of the drop beat", building into a lite-disco and pop-rock sound with funk-inspired guitar and bass groove. In the lyrics, the singer expresses hidden insecurities about their ability to be loved.

Teddy Sinclair and Willy Sinclair co-produced the sixth track, "The Happiest Girl". A downtempo piano ballad track characterized by grand piano instrumentals, the lyrics centers on the narrator's strong will to find happiness despite missing someone, using a "melancholic" melody to convey the desire for contentment. The rock infused ballad "Tally" is a midtempo pop song with elements of hip-hop and rock and "crunchy" guitar in the introduction. The lyrics discuss positivity and the beauty of achieving life's goals. The song "embodies a free, yet elegant mood", allowing the group to present their free spirit while speaking openly about the importance of being oneself. The closing track "Ready for Love" is a pop and dance-pop song with "sparkling" EDM chorus and horn flares with the likes of a house-pop "euphoric" instrumental. The song finds the group truly ready to leave their doubts behind and celebrate the future. On Born Pink as a whole, Park noted that "All the members have moments to shine, infusing a fresh sound into Blackpink's musical vessel".

== Promotion and release ==
Born Pink was released worldwide on September 16, 2022, by YG Entertainment and Interscope Records.

=== Marketing ===
Two singles supported Born Pink. Blackpink released the first, "Pink Venom" on August 19, which they performed at the 2022 MTV Video Music Awards, making them the first female K-pop group in history to do so. Its music video reached 90.4 million views in 24 hours, surpassing the previous record held by their own song "How You Like That" for the most-viewed video by a female artist in a single day. The second and lead single "Shut Down" was released alongside the album on September 16. Both singles peaked in the top twenty-five of the US Billboard Hot 100, and topped the Billboard Global 200 chart. "Ready for Love" was released as a promotional single on July 29, in collaboration with battle royale video game PUBG Mobile.

On September 16, the group held a live stream broadcast on the group's official YouTube channel one hour before the release of Born Pink. During the broadcast, held on a large stage aligning with the concept of the second single "Shut Down", the members revealed a variety of behind-the-scenes stories of the music video filming, discuss their future activities, and introduce the new songs and sneak peeks into the Born Pink World Tour. On the same day, Blackpink was interviewed on US radio stations SiriusXM and 102.7 KIIS FM as part of promotions for both "Shut Down" and the new album. On September 19, they performed the single live for the first time on ABC's Jimmy Kimmel Live!. From September 16 to 18, Spotify held an event called "Born Pink: The Pop-Up Experience" in Los Angeles to celebrate the new album's release. On December 2, Blackpink released the first episode of Born Pink Memories, a YouTube show showing the behind-the-scenes process of the album and its promotions.

=== Tour ===
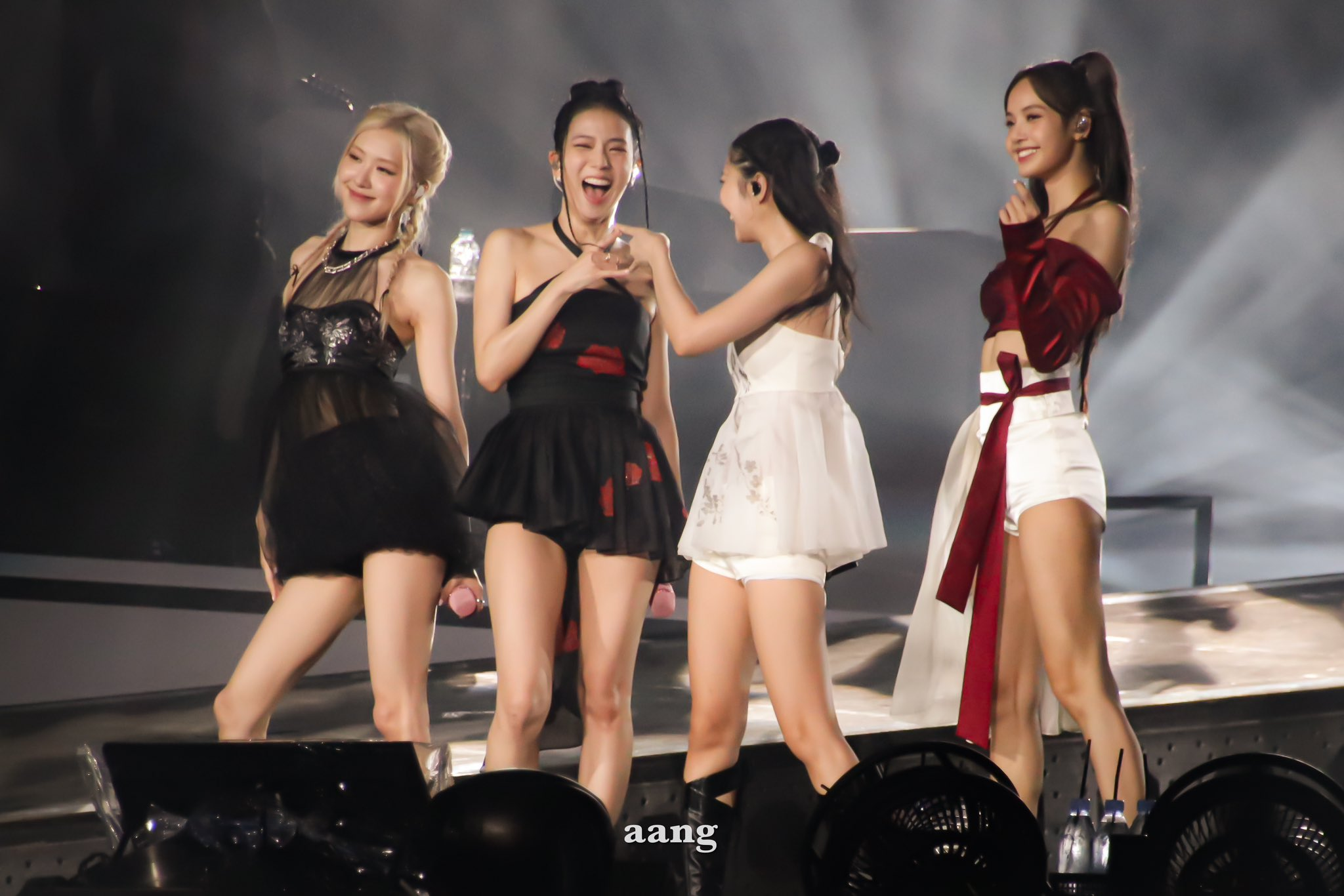
Blackpink performing on the Born Pink World Tour in Hanoi

On July 6, 2022, YG Entertainment confirmed that Blackpink would embark on the largest world tour by a K-pop girl group in history later in the year. On July 31, it was revealed that the group's second Korean studio album Born Pink would release in September, supported by the Born Pink World Tour starting in October. On August 8, Blackpink announced tour dates between October 2022 and June 2023 spanning Asia, North America, Europe, and Oceania. The tour began on October 15, 2022, at the KSPO Dome in Seoul, South Korea. It was followed by a series of arena concerts in North America and Europe from October through December. The tour continued from January to June 2023 with stadium shows across Asia as well as concerts in Mexico and Australia. Blackpink returned to France and the United States for an encore stadium tour in July and August. The tour concluded with two finale concerts at the Gocheok Sky Dome in Seoul, ending on September 17, 2023. The Born Pink World Tour drew 1.8 million attendees in total across 66 shows, making it the most-attended concert tour by a Korean girl group, and broke the record held by Spice Girls' Spice World – 2019 Tour to become the highest-grossing concert tour of all time by a female group.

== Artwork and packaging ==
Born Pink was released in three different physical formats—a box set version, a kit album, and a vinyl record—as well as digital download. The box set version has pink, black, and gray variations, each with a packing box, 80-page photobook, accordion lyrics sheet, photocards, postcards, two instant films and a sticker. The kit album, which allows buyers to listen to the album on their smartphones, contains a set of twelve photo cards, lyric and credit sheet, and a random polaroid card. The pink vinyl is special-edition was set to be released on December 30, 2022. A fourth physical format, called "digipacks", were announced on August 21, 2022; they come in four versions, one for each member, and was released on September 16. The digital cover art consists of two pink fangs that appear from the top against a white background. The group's name and album's title are shown under them in a grey font.

== Critical reception ==
Professional ratings
Aggregate scores
Source	Rating
AnyDecentMusic?	6.4/10
Metacritic	70/100
Review scores
Source	Rating
AllMusic	4/5 stars
The Arts Desk	3/5 stars
Clash	7/10
Evening Standard	2/5 stars
IZM	2/5 stars
The Line of Best Fit	5/10
NME	3/5 stars
Pitchfork	6.5/10
Rolling Stone	4/5 stars
Sputnikmusic	2.7/5
The Telegraph	4/5 stars

Born Pink was met with mixed reviews from music critics. At Metacritic, which assigns a normalized rating out of 100 to reviews from mainstream publications, the album received a weighted average score of 70 based on 9 reviews, indicating "generally favourable reviews".

Rob Sheffield of Rolling Stone proclaimed it "the landmark pop album Blackpink were born to make" and praised the songs as "high-impact bangers and ferocious rock & roll anthems." Park Jun-hee of The Korea Herald described listening to the album as "biting into a trick candy: You don't know what they'll bring out this time, but it'll always be a sweet surprise." Vince Ferreras from CNN Philippines called the album the group's most mature release to date and the one that shows the quartet's notable artistic growth the most. The Telegraph's writer Emma Madden described Born Pink as a "sound of the biggest girlgroup on the planet" where they "marry the very best of Western pop music" with "a romantic, gleefully chaotic South Korean sensibility". In her review for AllMusic, Neil Z. Yeung felt Born Pink "matures Blackpink with stronger production, more personal lyrics, and a bold conviction that cannot be contained". The Harvard Crimson's Alisa S. Regassa praised the album's innovative production and songwriting and felt that it pushed the boundaries of the K-pop industry. Billboard included Born Pink in their list of the 50 best albums of 2022, noting that it showcased "a more mature, grown-up version of the group."

Pitchfork's Alex Ramos noted that rather than following in the steps of "Pink Venom" by experimenting, the rest of the album features "more of the same". Writing for NME, Tanu I. Raj stated that on the album Blackpink treads the well-known thematic territory of pop music, but the imagery of "finding solace from heartbreak at the bottom of a bottle" or "boasting about being the type of girl you take to your 'mama house'" isn't particularly novel.

Billboard, Rolling Stone, and Uproxx named Born Pink one of the best albums released in 2022. Its singles, "Pink Venom" and "Shut Down", were also named among best songs of 2022.

=== Year-end lists ===
Born Pink on year-end lists
Critic/Publication	List	Rank	Ref.
Billboard	The 50 Best Albums of 2022	42	
Billboard	The 25 Best K-Pop Albums of 2022	19	
PopCrush	15 Best Pop Albums of 2022	—N/a	
Rolling Stone	The 100 Best Albums of 2022	25	
Rolling Stone	Rob Sheffield's Top 20 Albums of 2022	20	
Uproxx	The Best Albums of 2022	—N/a	
Uproxx	The Best K-Pop Albums of 2022	—N/a	

== Awards and nominations ==
Awards and nominations for Born Pink
Year	Organization	Award	Result	Ref.
2022	Asian Pop Music Awards	Best Album of the Year (Overseas)	Won	
2022	Asian Pop Music Awards	Best Producer (Overseas) (Note: Producers: Teddy Park, 24, Danny Chung, Bekuh Boom, and R.Tee)	Won	
2022	Asian Pop Music Awards	Top 20 Albums of the Year (Overseas)	Won	
2022	Asian Pop Music Awards	People's Choice Award (Overseas)	5th place	
2022	Genie Music Awards	Album of the Year	Nominated	
2022	MAMA Awards	Album of the Year	Nominated	
2022	Melon Music Awards	Album of the Year	Nominated	
2022	RTHK International Pop Poll Awards	Top Album Award – Korean	Won	
2023	Circle Chart Music Awards	Artist of the Year – Physical Album (4th Quarter)	Nominated	
2023	Golden Disc Awards	Best Album (Bonsang)	Won	
2023	Golden Disc Awards	Album of the Year (Daesang)	Nominated	
2023	Seoul Music Awards	Main Award (Bonsang)	Won	

World records for Born Pink
Year	Organization	Award	Ref.
2022	Guinness World Records	First K-pop group to reach No.1 on the UK albums chart (female)	
2022	Guinness World Records	First K-pop group to reach No.1 on the US albums chart (female)	

== Commercial performance ==
On August 18, 2022, YG Entertainment confirmed that Born Pink surpassed 1.5 million pre-orders in six days, followed by an announcement notifying that the album had sold over two million copies in worldwide pre-orders on August 25, making it the first album by a K-pop female act to achieve the milestone. Following its release, Born Pink became the first album by a K-pop girl group to sell over one million copies on its first day on Hanteo, doing it in less than 12 hours. Born Pink debuted at number one on the Circle Album Chart with 2,141,281 copies sold in less than two days of tracking and became the first album by a K-pop girl group to sell over two million copies. The kit version of the album debuted at number four with 59,718 copies sold. The album also topped the monthly Circle Album Chart, selling 2,457,206 copies as well as 60,000 copies of the kit version in the month of September.

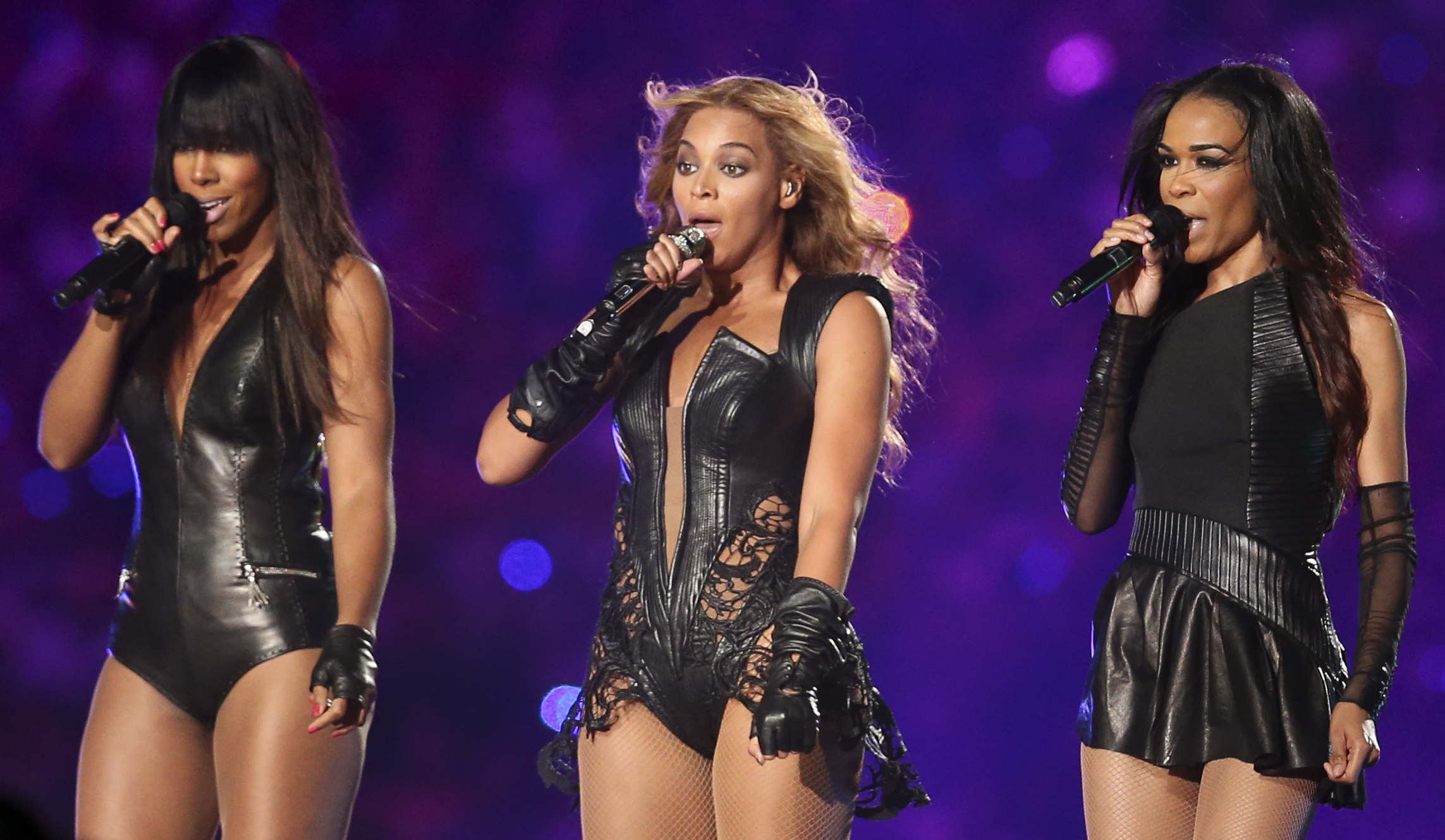
Blackpink became the first girl group to simultaneously top the album charts in the United States and United Kingdom since Destiny's Child in 2001.

In the United States, Born Pink debuted at number one on the Billboard 200 with 102,000 album-equivalent units, including 75,500 pure album sales, 25,000 stream-equivalent sales (resulting from 37.49 million on-demand streams), and 1,500 track-equivalent sales. It became the first album by a female Korean act to top the chart and the first album by a female group to do so since Danity Kane's Welcome to the Dollhouse in 2008. The album also debuted atop the Top Album Sales chart with 75,500 copies sold, which comprised 64,000 CD sales and 11,500 digital sales, earning the seventh-largest sales week of any album in 2022. Blackpink became the eighth all-female group in history to top the Billboard 200, following Diana Ross & The Supremes, The Go-Go's, Spice Girls, TLC, The Chicks, Destiny's Child and Danity Kane. In its second week, the album descended to number four with 40,000 album-equivalent units, including 26,000 pure album sales. In the United Kingdom, Born Pink also became the first album by a K-pop girl group to reach number one on the UK Albums Chart. It marked the first time a girl group simultaneously topped the album charts in the United States and United Kingdom since Destiny's Child's Survivor in 2001. Born Pink also topped the charts in Canada and Portugal and reached the top ten in Netherlands, France, Germany, Lithuania, Sweden and Norway.

All eight tracks on the album collectively drew 371.5 million streams and sold 55,000 downloads worldwide and went on to debut in the top half of the Billboard Global 200 and the top-forty of the Global Excl. U.S. in the week ending September 22. Both "Pink Venom" and "Shut Down" peaked at number one on the Global 200 and Global Excl. U.S., making Born Pink the third album after Sour and Be to yield multiple Global 200 chart-toppers and the second after Be to yield multiple Global Excl. U.S. chart-toppers. According to the International Federation of the Phonographic Industry (IFPI), the album was the eighth best-selling album worldwide across all formats in 2022, marking Blackpink's first album to rank in the top ten. It was the seventh best-selling album worldwide in pure sales in 2022, making it Blackpink's second album to rank in the top ten after The Album (2020).

== Track listing ==
Born Pink track listing
No.	Title	Lyrics	Music	Arrangement	Length
1.	"Pink Venom"	Teddy Park; Danny Chung	Teddy P.; 24; R.Tee; Ido	24; R.Tee; Ido	3:06
2.	"Shut Down"	Teddy P.; Chung; Vince	Teddy P.; 24	24	2:55
3.	"Typa Girl"	Bekuh Boom	Boom; Dominsuk	Dominsuk	2:59
4.	"Yeah Yeah Yeah"	VVN; Kush; Jisoo; Rosé	Kush; R.Tee; VVN; Ido	R.Tee; Kush; Ido	2:58
5.	"Hard to Love" (Rosé solo)	Freddy Wexler; Bianca Atterberry; Max Wolfgang; Teddy P.	Wexler; Teddy P.; Atterberry; Max Wolfgang; 24; R.Tee	24; R.Tee	2:42
6.	"The Happiest Girl"	Teddy Sinclair; Willy Sinclair; Paro	T. Sinclair; W. Sinclair; Paro; 24	24; Nohc	3:42
7.	"Tally"	Nat Dunn; David Phelan; Alex Oriet; Brian Lee; Soraya LaPread	Dunn; Phelan; Oriet; Lee; LaPread; 24	24	3:04
8.	"Ready for Love"	Teddy P.; VVN	Teddy P.; VVN; 24; Kush; Boom	24	3:04
Total length:					24:34

== Personnel ==
Credits adapted from album liner notes and Tidal.

Musicians

- Blackpink – creative directors
  - Jisoo – vocals (tracks 1–4, 6–8), lyricist (track 4)
  - Jennie – vocals (tracks 1–4, 6–8)
  - Rosé – vocals (all tracks), lyricist (track 4)
  - Lisa – vocals (tracks 1–4, 6–8)
- Teddy Park – creative director, lyricist (tracks 1, 2, 5 and 8), composer (tracks 1, 2, 5 and 8)
- Danny Chung – lyricist (tracks 1 and 2)
- 24 – composer (tracks 1, 2, 5–8)
- R.Tee – composer (tracks 1, 4 and 5)
- Vince – lyricist (track 2)
- Bekuh Boom – lyricist (track 3), composer (tracks 3 and 8)
- Dominsuk – composer (track 3)
- Kush – lyricist (track 4), composer (tracks 4 and 8)
- VVN – lyricist (tracks 4 and 8), composer (tracks 4 and 8)
- Freddy Wexler – lyricist (track 5), composer (track 5)
- Bianca "Blush" Atterberry – lyricist (track 5), composer (track 5)
- Max Wolfgang – lyricist (track 5), composer (track 5)
- Teddy Sinclair – lyricist (track 6), composer (track 6)
- Willy Sinclair – lyricist (track 6), composer (track 6)
- Paro – lyricist (track 6), composer (track 6)
- Nat Dunn – lyricist (track 7), composer (track 7)
- David Phelan – lyricist (track 7), composer (track 7)
- Alex Oriet – lyricist (track 7), composer (track 7)
- Brian Lee – lyricist (track 7), composer (track 7)
- Soraya LaPread – lyricist (track 7)

Technical

- Teddy Park – producer (all tracks)
- 24 – arranger (tracks 1, 2, 5–8), producer (track 6), mixer (track 1)
- R.Tee – arranger (tracks 1, 4 and 5), mixer (track 1)
- Ido – arranger (tracks 1 and 4), mixer (track 1)
- Dominsuk – arranger (track 3)
- Freddy Wexler – producer (track 5)
- Nohc – arranger (track 6), producer (track 6)
- Paro – producer (track 6)
- Youngju Bang – recording engineer (all tracks)
- Josh Gudwin – mix engineer (tracks 2–5, 7–8)
- Chris Gehringer – mastering engineer (all tracks)

== Charts ==
=== Weekly charts ===
Weekly chart performance for Born Pink
Chart (2022–2023)	Peak position
Australian Albums (ARIA)	2
Austrian Albums (Ö3 Austria)	6
Belgian Albums (Ultratop Flanders)	3
Belgian Albums (Ultratop Wallonia)	7
Canadian Albums (Billboard)	1
Croatian International Albums (HDU)	1
Danish Albums (Hitlisten)	8
Dutch Albums (Album Top 100)	7
Finnish Albums (Suomen virallinen lista)	3
French Albums (SNEP)	3
German Albums (Offizielle Top 100)	3
Greek Albums (IFPI)	12
Hungarian Albums (MAHASZ)	4
Icelandic Albums (Tónlistinn)	16
Irish Albums (Official Charts)	13
Italian Albums (FIMI)	19
Japanese Albums (Oricon)	3
Japanese Combined Albums (Oricon)	4
Japanese Hot Albums (Billboard Japan)	4
Lithuanian Albums (AGATA)	3
New Zealand Albums (RMNZ)	2
Norwegian Albums (VG-lista)	6
Polish Albums (ZPAV)	3
Portuguese Albums (AFP)	1
Scottish Albums (Official Charts)	2
South Korean Albums (Circle)	1
South Korean Albums (Circle) Kit version	4
South Korean Albums (Circle) LP version	8
Spanish Albums (Promusicae)	9
Swedish Albums (Sverigetopplistan)	8
Swiss Albums (Schweizer Hitparade)	7
UK Albums (Official Charts)	1
US Billboard 200	1

=== Monthly charts ===
Monthly chart performance for Born Pink
Chart (2022–23)	Peak position
Japanese Albums (Oricon)	8
South Korean Albums (Circle)	1
South Korean Albums (Circle) Kit version	13
South Korean Albums (Circle) LP version	28

=== Year-end charts ===
2022 year-end chart performance for Born Pink
Chart (2022)	Position
French Albums (SNEP)	137
German Albums (Offizielle Top 100)	93
Global Albums (IFPI)	8
Japanese Download Albums (Billboard Japan)	89
Portuguese Albums (AFP)	33
South Korean Albums (Circle)	4
UK Cassette Albums (OCC)	8
US Top Album Sales (Billboard)	51

2023 year-end chart performance for Born Pink
Chart (2023)	Position
French Albums (SNEP)	139
Hungarian Albums (MAHASZ)	71
Polish Albums (ZPAV)	97
Portuguese Albums (AFP)	62
South Korean Albums (Circle)	88
US Top Current Album Sales (Billboard)	77

== Certifications and sales ==
Certifications and sales for Born Pink
Region	Certification	Certified units/sales
France (SNEP)	Platinum	100,000^{‡}
Japan	—	34,475
New Zealand (RMNZ)	Gold	7,500^{‡}
Poland (ZPAV)	Platinum	20,000^{‡}
South Korea (KMCA)	2× Million	3,077,249
United Kingdom (BPI)	Silver	60,000^{‡}
United States	—	101,500
^{‡} Sales+streaming figures based on certification alone.

== Release history ==
Release dates and formats for Born Pink
Region	Date	Format(s)	Label(s)	Ref.
Various	September 16, 2022	CD; digital download; streaming	YG; Interscope	
South Korea	September 16, 2022	Kit	YG	
France	September 16, 2022	Cassette	YG; Interscope	
Germany	September 16, 2022	Cassette	YG; Interscope	
Spain	September 16, 2022	Cassette	YG; Interscope	
United Kingdom	September 16, 2022	Cassette	YG; Interscope; Polydor	
Japan	September 21, 2022	CD	YG; Universal Japan	
South Korea	December 30, 2022	Vinyl LP	YG	

== See also ==
- List of best-selling albums in South Korea
- List of best-selling girl group albums
- List of Billboard 200 number-one albums of 2022
- List of certified albums in South Korea
- List of Circle Album Chart number ones of 2022
- Lists of fastest-selling albums
- List of K-pop albums on the Billboard charts
- List of number-one albums of 2022 (Canada)
- List of number-one albums of 2022 (Portugal)
- List of UK Albums Chart number ones of the 2020s
