= Ready for Love (Blackpink song) =

- Promotional graphic

Promotional single by Blackpink

from the album Born Pink
- Language: Korean; English
- Released: July 29, 2022
- Recorded: 2020
- Studio: The Black Label (Seoul)
- Genre: House-pop; EDM
- Length: 3:03
- Label: YG; Interscope
- Composers: Teddy; VVN; 24; Kush; Bekuh Boom
- Lyricists: Teddy; VVN

Music video
- "Ready for Love" on YouTube

"Ready for Love" is a song by South Korean girl group Blackpink for their collaboration with battle royale video game PUBG Mobile. It was released as an animated music video on YouTube on July 29, 2022, making it the group's first Korean release since The Album (2020). It was later featured on the group's second studio album, Born Pink (2022).

== Background and release ==
On July 12, 2022, YG Entertainment revealed that Blackpink would hold a virtual in-game concert entitled "Blackpink: The Virtual" in PUBG Mobile from July 22 to 30, including performances of the group's hit songs as well as a special track to be revealed during the event for the first time. Prior to its release, a scene in Blackpink's 2020 Netflix documentary, Light Up the Sky, showed the members in the recording process of the song. On July 24, 2022, a teaser poster was uploaded to both PUBG Mobile and Blackpink's official social media accounts, confirming the song's release date to be July 29. On July 27, 2022, PUBG Mobile uploaded individual teaser photos on their social media accounts for each member and one as a group, each using avatars. The background of each member's teaser corresponds with the color of the flowers in the song's cover art. The song was released on July 29, 2022 exclusively as an animated music video on YouTube. The song was later included in the album Born Pink, which released on September 16.

== Composition ==
In an interview before the virtual concert, YG Entertainment described the song as "a pop song with a cool [beat] drop that breaks the static flow of a lyrical piano performance." The song has been described as featuring a EDM chorus with the likes of a house-pop instrumental.

== Music video ==
A scene in the music video with virtual avatars of the Blackpink members dancing on a galactic stage

On July 27, 2022, PUBG Mobile released a 17-second concept teaser for the music video, depicting fantastical landscapes in a video game world. Another 14-second long teaser clip of the music video was released by PUBG Mobile on July 28. The official music video was released on July 29 on both of Blackpink and PUBG Mobile’s official YouTube channels. It features virtual avatars of the Blackpink members exploring various mystical settings, riding motorcycles and floating through pink cloudscapes. The environments depicted include a forest with a huge helmet-like object in the centre, an ice-covered land with a frozen lake running by it, a never-ending space full of pink clouds, and lastly a glass flower bursting out. For the song's chorus, the avatars are shown singing and dancing to the song's choreography on a galactic stage.

== Commercial performance ==
"Ready for Love" garnered 43.7 million views and topped YouTube's ranking of the most-viewed music videos globally in its first week. Despite only being available on YouTube, "Ready for Love" debuted on the Billboard Global 200 at number 196 and on the Global Excl. U.S. at number 97. It also debuted at number three on the Billboard Vietnam Hot 100 and number 21 on Malaysia Songs, becoming Blackpink's first top-ten entry on the former chart since its launch in January 2022. Following the track's release with album Born Pink, "Ready for Love" reached a new peak of number 60 on the Global 200 and number 39 on the Global Excl. U.S., as well as number 10 on Malaysia Songs.

== Credits and personnel ==
Credits adapted from the liner notes of Born Pink.

Recording

- Recorded at The Black Label Studio (Seoul)
- Mixed at Gudwin Music Group Inc
- Mastered at Sterling Sound (New York City)

Personnel

- Blackpink – vocals
- Teddy – lyricist, composer
- VVN – lyricist, composer
- 24 – composer, arranger
- Kush – composer
- Bekuh Boom – composer
- Youngju Bang – recording engineer
- Josh Gudwin – mixing engineer
- Chris Gehringer – mastering engineer

== Charts ==
=== Weekly charts ===
Weekly chart performance for "Ready for Love"
Chart (2022)	Peak position
Global 200 (Billboard)	60
Hungary (Single Top 40)	32
Malaysia (Billboard)	10
Philippines (Billboard)	10
Singapore (RIAS)	12
South Korea (Circle)	52
UK Video Streaming (OCC)	25
US World Digital Song Sales (Billboard)	8
Vietnam Hot 100 (Billboard)	3

=== Monthly charts ===
Monthly chart performance for "Ready for Love"
Chart (2022)	Peak position
South Korea (Circle)	105

== See also ==
- List of K-pop songs on the Billboard charts
