= Typa Girl =

Song by Blackpink

from the album Born Pink
- Released: September 16, 2022
- Studio: The Black Label (Seoul)
- Genre: Hip hop; pop; electronic
- Length: 3:00
- Label: YG; Interscope
- Composers: Bekuh Boom; Dominsuk
- Lyricist: Bekuh Boom

Audio video
- "Typa Girl" on YouTube

"Typa Girl" is a song recorded by South Korean girl group Blackpink. It is the third track on group's second studio album, Born Pink (2022), which was released on September 16, 2022, through YG and Interscope. It is a hip-hop, pop and electronic song with a trap beat and synth. It was written by Bekuh Boom, who composed the song with Dominsuk. Lyrically, the track sees the group speak confidently about being the type of person that everyone wants.

"Typa Girl" peaked at number 16 on the Billboard Global 200 and was a top-ten hit in Hong Kong, Indonesia, Malaysia, the Philippines, Singapore, and Vietnam. It also entered the national charts in countries such as Australia, Canada, France, South Korea, and the United Kingdom. In the United States, the song debuted at number 14 on the Bubbling Under Hot 100 chart.

== Background ==
On July 31, 2022, YG Entertainment officially released the album trailer video on the group's official social media accounts, announcing that the group's new world tour would start in October, following a pre-release single in August and the album itself in September. "Tally" was announced as the third track of Born Pink on September 7, 2022, through the group's official social media accounts. The song was released alongside the album on September 16, 2022 by YG and Interscope.

== Lyrics and production ==
"Typa Girl" was written and composed by Bekuh Boom with additional composition and arrangement credits from Dominsuk. In an interview with Variety, Boom said that she had written the demo for the song in 2021 at The Black Label's studio and she had originally "thought Lisa might use it for her next solo single". She further described it as a "song to empower women".

"Typa Girl" is a slow hip-hop, pop, and electronic song that features heavy trap beats and synth. It's incorporates organ, brass sounds, and piano chords in its production. Where it began with a soft piano tune at the intro "that rings like a bell before the hi-hats and snares hit on the beat drop", before it changed into new remastered MIDI sound. In terms of musical notation, the song is written in the key of G major with a tempo of 132 beats per minutes. The Korea Herald described it as a "hardcore hip hop", where the lyrics talks about "How can a powerful and wealthy woman captive a man and put him under her spell".

== Reception ==
Writing for Teen Vogue, Devon Abelman praised "Typa Girl" as an empowering anthem that showed off "Blackpink's signature sassy-yet-genius wordplay" and named it one of the 79 best K-pop songs of 2022. Clash called the song "hard-hitting both lyrically and production wise", naming the lyric "I bring money to the table, not your dinner" for providing an "impressive sting". On the other hand, Pitchfork's Alex Ramos derided the song for its "unsteady attempts at bass-heavy ringtone rap".

=== Accolades ===
At year-end award ceremonies, "Typa Girl" received a nomination for Artist of the Year – Global Digital Music (September) at the 12th Circle Chart Music Awards alongside Born Pink's other songs "Shut Down", "Hard to Love", and "The Happiest Girl", with "Shut Down" ultimately winning the award.

== Commercial performance ==
"Typa Girl" debuted at number 16 on the Billboard Global 200 and at number 13 on the Billboard Global Excl. US. In South Korea, the song debuted at number 140 and peaked at number 93 on the Circle Digital Chart, and also peaked at number 20 on Billboard's South Korea Songs chart. "Typa Girl" debuted at number 93 on the UK Singles Chart, the group's eleventh entry on the chart. In the United States, the song did not enter the Billboard Hot 100, but did peak at number 14 on the Billboard Bubbling Under Hot 100 chart. It also entered in the top ten in Hong Kong, Indonesia, Malaysia, Philippines, Singapore, and Vietnam.

== Live performances and other usage ==
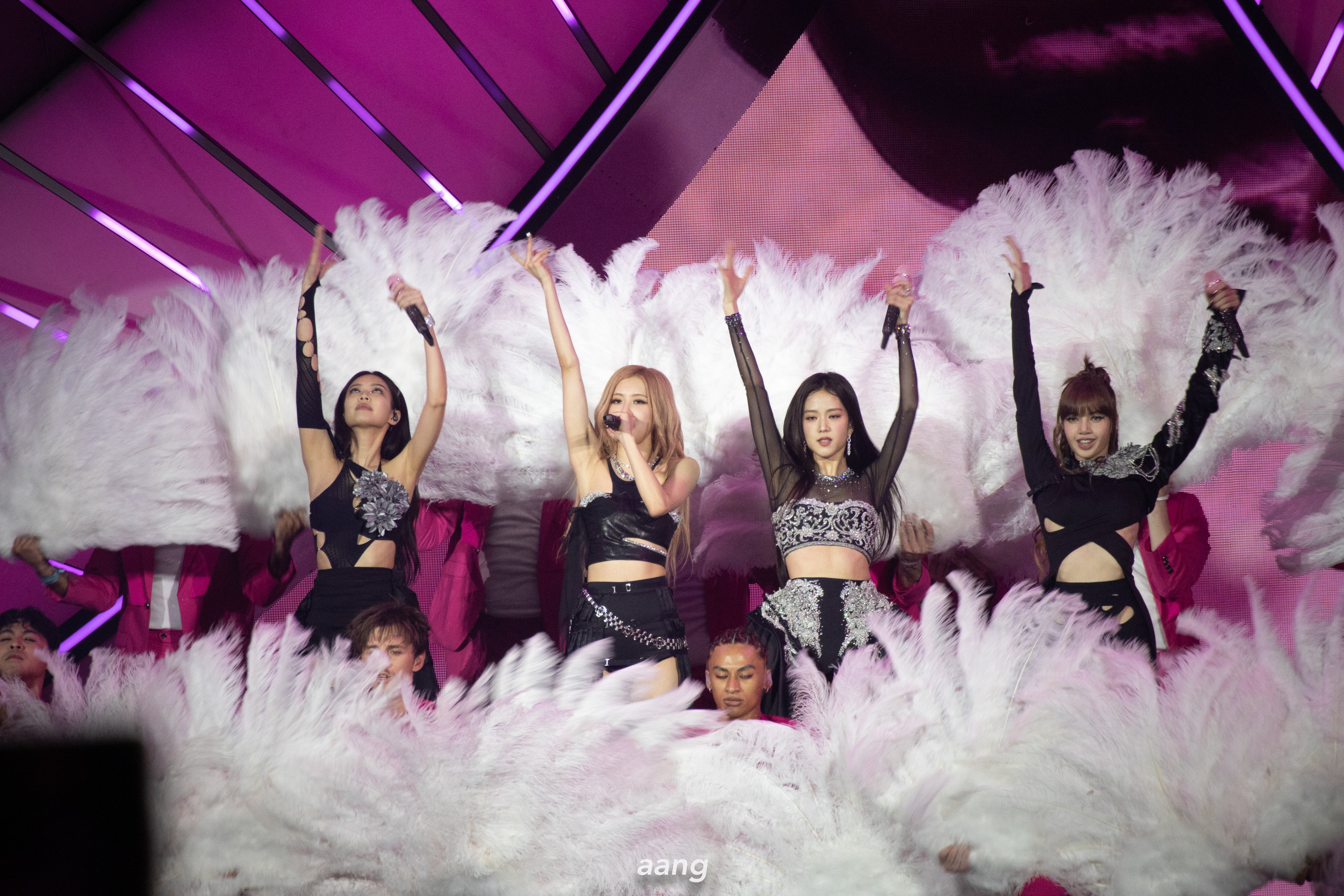
Blackpink performing "Typa Girl" at Coachella with large feather fans

"Typa Girl" was included on the set list of Blackpink's Born Pink World Tour (2022–23). In April 2023, they performed the song during their headlining set at the Coachella Valley Music and Arts Festival in Indio, California, featuring new choreography reminiscent of a burlesque performance. For the song, the Blackpink members appeared inside big feather fans carried onstage by the dance crew one by one. The large feather wings were said to be references to Marilyn Monroe's “Diamonds Are a Girl's Best Friend" performance in Gentlemen Prefer Blondes (1953), as well as the traditional Korean fan dance buchaechum. Blackpink continued to perform "Typa Girl" and its new choreography for the encore leg of the Born Pink World Tour as well during their headlining set in July at BST Hyde Park in London.

American singer-songwriter Tori Kelly covered "Typa Girl" in an acoustic version posted in her TikTok account.

== Credits and personnel ==
Credits adapted from the liner notes of Born Pink.

Recording

- Recorded at The Black Label Studio (Seoul)
- Mixed at Gudwin Music Group Inc
- Mastered at Sterling Sound (New York City)

Personnel

- Blackpink – vocals
- Bekuh Boom – lyricist, composer
- Dominsuk – composer, arranger
- Youngju Bang – recording engineer
- Josh Gudwin – mixing engineer
- Chris Gehringer – mastering engineer

== Charts ==
=== Weekly charts ===
Weekly chart performance for "Typa Girl"
Chart (2022)	Peak position
Australia (ARIA)	57
Canada Hot 100 (Billboard)	51
France (SNEP)	171
Global 200 (Billboard)	16
Hong Kong (Billboard)	9
Hungary (Single Top 40)	34
India International (IMI)	18
Indonesia (Billboard)	7
Malaysia (Billboard)	3
New Zealand Hot Singles (RMNZ)	4
Philippines (Billboard)	3
Portugal (AFP)	101
Singapore (RIAS)	3
South Korea (Circle)	93
Taiwan (Billboard)	14
UK Singles (OCC)	93
US Bubbling Under Hot 100 (Billboard)	14
Vietnam Hot 100 (Billboard)	3

=== Monthly charts ===
Monthly chart performance for "Typa Girl"
Chart (2022)	Peak position
South Korea (Circle)	176

== Certifications ==
Certifications for "Typa Girl"
Region	Certification	Certified units/sales
Brazil (Pro-Música Brasil)	2× Platinum	80,000^{‡}
^{‡} Sales+streaming figures based on certification alone.

== See also ==
- List of best-selling girl group singles
- List of K-pop songs on the Billboard charts
