= The Happiest Girl (song) =

2022 song by Blackpink

Song by Blackpink

from the album Born Pink
- Released: September 16, 2022
- Recorded: The Black Label (Seoul)
- Genre: Pop
- Length: 3:42
- Label: YG; Interscope
- Composers: Teddy Sinclair; Willy Sinclair; Paro; 24
- Lyricists: Teddy Sinclair; Willy Sinclair; Paro

Audio video
- "The Happiest Girl" on YouTube

"The Happiest Girl" is a song recorded by South Korean girl group Blackpink. It is the sixth track on group's second studio album, Born Pink (2022), which was released on September 16, 2022, through YG and Interscope. The track was composed by its writers Teddy Sinclair, Willy Sinclair and Paro, as well as 24. "The Happiest Girl" is a piano ballad that emphasizes the group's vocals, with melancholic lyrics about trying to be happy after a breakup.

"The Happiest Girl" was positively reviewed by critics for Blackpink's vocal delivery and the vulnerable lyrics. The song peaked at number 34 on the Billboard Global 200 and was a top-ten hit in Malaysia, the Philippines, Singapore and Vietnam.

== Background ==
On July 31, 2022, YG Entertainment officially released the album trailer video on the group's official social media accounts, announcing that the group's new world tour would start in October, following a pre-release single in August and the album itself in September. "The Happiest Girl" was announced as the sixth track of Born Pink on September 7, 2022, through the group's official social media accounts. The song was released alongside the album on September 16, 2022 by YG and Interscope.

== Lyrics and production ==
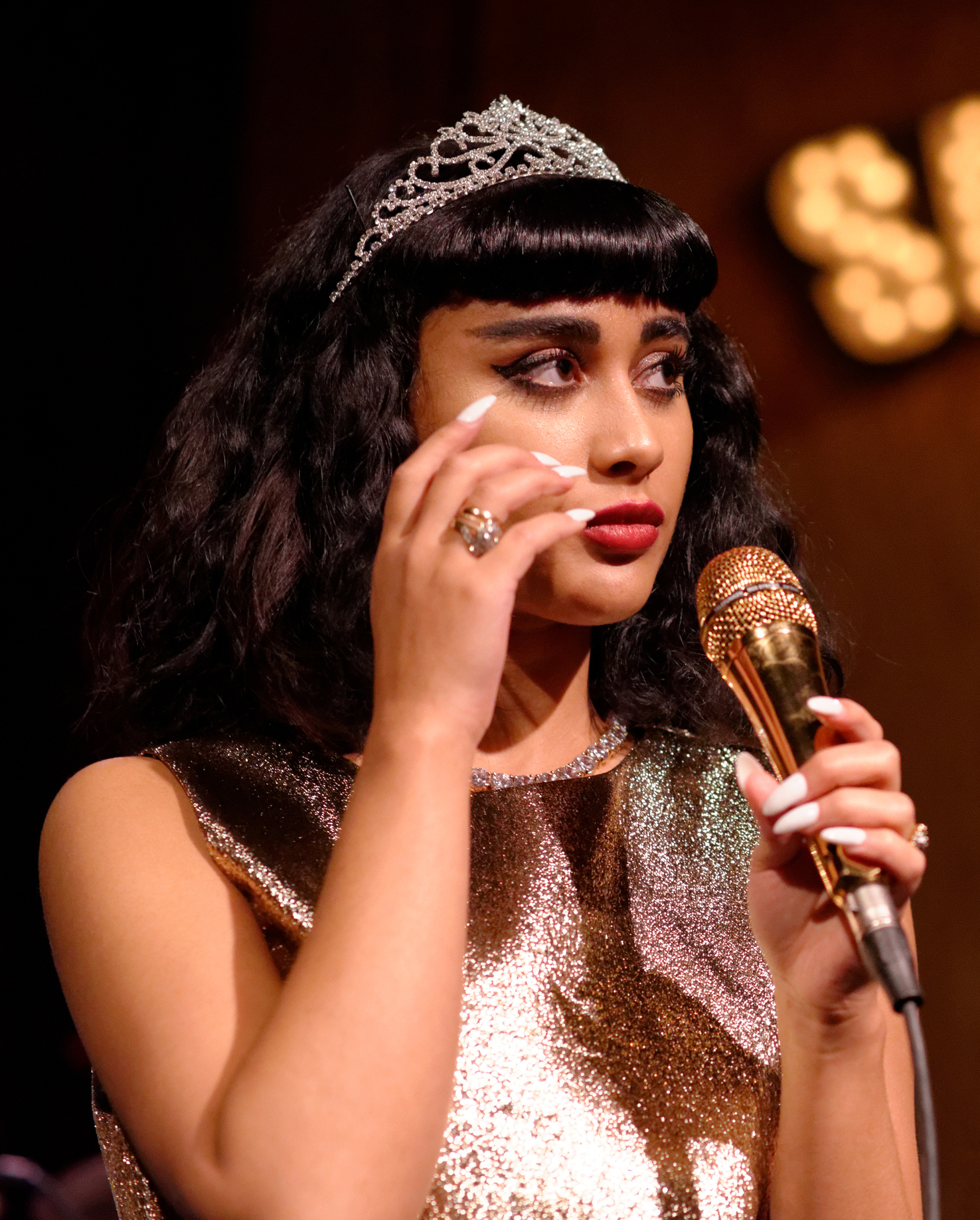
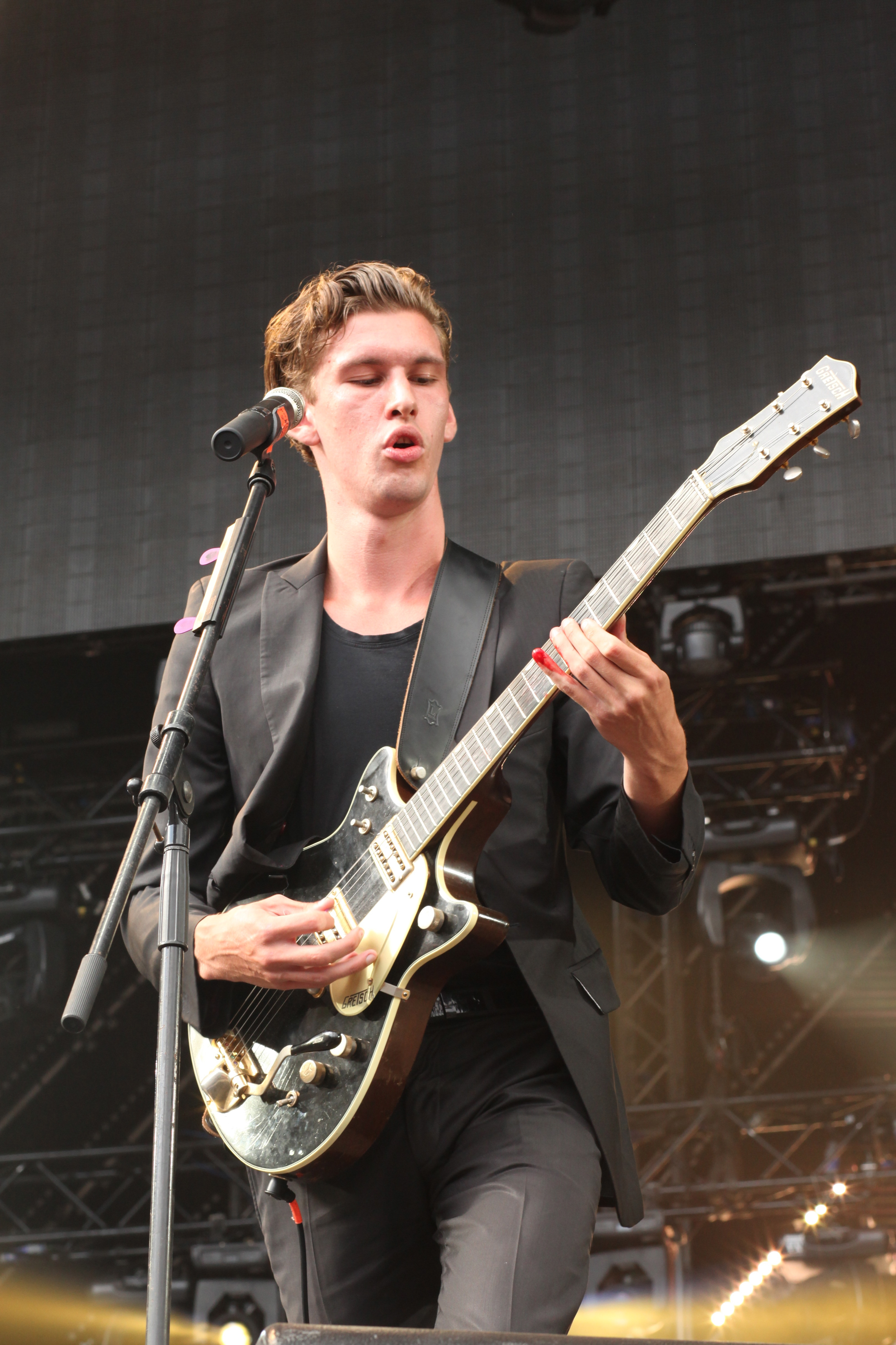
"The Happiest Girl" features songwriting contributions from Teddy Sinclair (left) and Willy Sinclair (right).

"The Happiest Girl" was written by pop-star couple Teddy Sinclair and Willy Sinclair as well as Paro, and composed by them alongside 24. It is a downtempo piano ballad which places emphasis on Blackpink's vocals over grand piano instrumentals. The song is performed in the key of C major with a tempo of 91 beats per minute in common time.

Lyrically, "The Happiest Girl" sees Blackpink sing openly about their desire to be happy after losing a special person. The group sings about trying to find solace from heartbreak through drinking and swallowing the pain away, with the song's hook repeating, “I can stop the tears if I want to.” The song offers a glimpse into their devotion to love and the pain it can bring in vulnerable lines such as "My heart only wants you."

== Critical reception ==
The song received generally positive reviews from music critics for the vulnerable lyrics and Blackpink's vocal delivery. Jeff Benjamin from Billboard ranked "The Happiest Girl" as the second best song on the album for allowing the group to demonstrate their "full-fledged vocal performance." In particular, he praised Jisoo's "gorgeous head voice" for shining with a "new vulnerability" as well as Lisa, who usually raps, for showing off her "mature, steady delivery" on the track. Park Jun-hee of The Korea Herald praised each member's performance on the song, stating that Jisoo and Rosé's falsetto made the song feel "soothing" and left a "deep impression on listeners", while Lisa and Jennie forsook their forte of rapping in order to "tug at people's heartstrings" with their low tones. Similarly, Vince Ferreras from CNN Philippines complimented the track for highlighting the group's vocals and noted Lisa's performance as its "biggest revelation." The Harvard Crimson's Alisa S. Regassa commended Blackpink for stepping outside of their comfort zone and breaking their usual girl crush concept to showcase themselves in a "more raw and authentic light." She concurred with other critics that Lisa and Jennie replacing their usual rap verses for a lyrical ballad was a "novelty" and praised Lisa's "beautiful singing voice." Tanu I. Raj from NME praised the song's initial "simple, poignant piano melody", but felt that the song "loses its charm with repetitive arrangements." Writing for Rolling Stone, Rob Sheffield opined that the song was the "only bummer" on the album and preferred their more joyous songs.

== Commercial performance ==
"The Happiest Girl" debuted at number 34 on the Billboard Global 200 and at number 22 on the Billboard Global Excl. U.S. chart. In South Korea, the song debuted at number 134 and peaked at number 89 on the Circle Digital Chart. It also peaked within the top ten on Billboard's Philippines Songs, Malaysia Songs, and the Vietnam Hot 100, as well as the RIAS top streaming chart.

== Accolades ==
At year-end award ceremonies, "The Happiest Girl" received a nomination for Artist of the Year – Global Digital Music (September) at the 12th Circle Chart Music Awards alongside Born Pink's other songs "Shut Down", "Typa Girl", and "Hard to Love", with "Shut Down" ultimately winning the award.

== Credits and personnel ==
Credits adapted from the liner notes of Born Pink.

Recording

- Recorded at The Black Label Studio (Seoul)
- Mixed at Gudwin Music Group Inc
- Mastered at Sterling Sound (New York City)

Personnel

- Blackpink – vocals
- Teddy Sinclair – lyricist, composer
- Willy Sinclair – lyricist, composer
- Paro – lyricist, composer
- 24 – composer, arranger
- Nohc – arranger
- Youngju Bang – recording engineer
- Josh Gudwin – mixing engineer
- Chris Gehringer – mastering engineer

== Charts ==
=== Weekly charts ===
Weekly chart performance for "The Happiest Girl"
Chart (2022)	Peak position
Canada Hot 100 (Billboard)	81
Global 200 (Billboard)	34
Hong Kong (Billboard)	14
Hungary (Single Top 40)	33
Indonesia (Billboard)	15
Malaysia (Billboard)	5
New Zealand Hot Singles (RMNZ)	9
Philippines (Billboard)	6
Singapore (RIAS)	6
South Korea (Circle)	89
Taiwan (Billboard)	18
Vietnam Hot 100 (Billboard)	6

=== Monthly charts ===
Monthly chart performance for "Hard to Love"
Chart (2022)	Peak position
South Korea (Circle)	172

== See also ==
- List of K-pop songs on the Billboard charts
