= Hard to Love (Blackpink song) =

Song by Blackpink

from the album Born Pink
- Released: September 16, 2022
- Studio: The Black Label (Seoul)
- Genre: Dance; pop rock; disco
- Length: 2:43
- Label: YG; Interscope
- Composers: Freddy Wexler; Teddy; Bianca Atterberry; Max Wolfgang; 24; R.Tee
- Lyricists: Freddy Wexler; Bianca Atterberry; Max Wolfgang; Teddy
- Producers: Wexler; Teddy

Audio sample
- Verse: file; help

Audio video
- "Hard to Love" on YouTube

"Hard to Love" is a song by South Korean girl group Blackpink, sung as a solo by member Rosé. It was released on September 16, 2022, as the fifth track on Blackpink's second studio album Born Pink (2022). It is an upbeat dance, guitar pop, pop rock and disco track with elements of city-pop, 90's rock and roll and "edgy" pop. The track's lyrics revolve around a protagonist expressing hidden insecurities about their ability to be loved.

"Hard to Love" debuted at number 27 on the Billboard Global 200 and entered the national charts in countries such as Australia, Canada, and South Korea. It was also a top-ten hit in Malaysia, the Philippines, Singapore and Vietnam.

== Background ==
In March 2021, New Zealand and South Korean singer Rosé released her debut single album, R, featuring the lead single "On the Ground." The album debuted at number two on the Gaon Album Chart, becoming the best-selling album by a female soloist in the chart's history. Simultaneously, "On the Ground" peaked at number one on the Billboard Global 200 and achieved the highest position ever by a Korean female soloist on the US Billboard Hot 100.

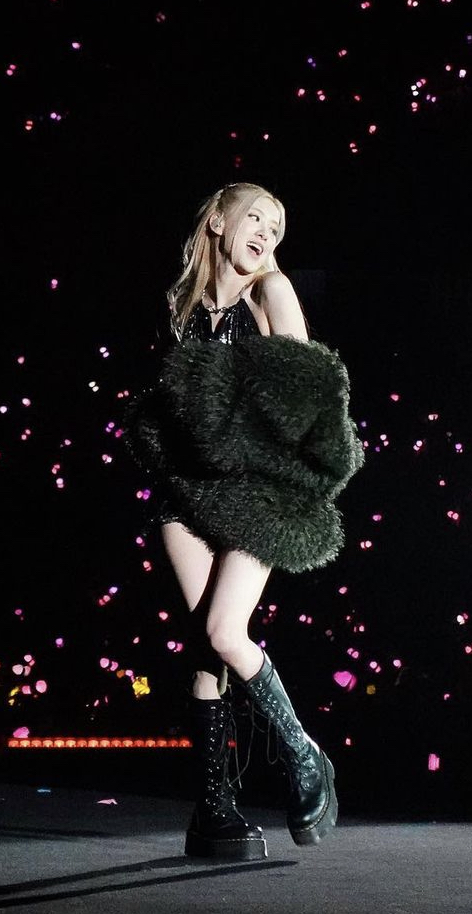
Rosé performing “Hard to Love” during the Born Pink World Tour.

On July 31, 2022, YG Entertainment officially released the album trailer video on the group's official social media accounts, announcing that the group's new world tour would start in October, following a pre-release single in August and the album itself in September. "Hard To Love" was announced as the fifth track of Born Pink on September 7, 2022, through the group's official social media accounts. The song marks the singer's third solo track since the release of her debut single album in March 2021. Blackpink included the song on the set list of their Born Pink World Tour (2022–23), where Rosé performed it as part of her solo stage.

== Lyrics and production ==
The lyrics of the song were written by Freddy Wexler and Bianca Atterberry. Wexler conceived "Hard to Love" while he was on a jam session with his friends. He later sent a demo of the song to Teddy Park in June 2022 and was video called by him, Lisa, and Rosé the next day. Over the next month, he would FaceTime with Park and the group, who suggested changes. Wexler admitted he initially felt "intimidated" since music holds an "almost religious experience" for K-pop fans, creating pressure to deliver something exceptional. However, he shared that the outcome "turned out better than [he] could have ever imagined," noting, "Usually, it’s never as good as it was in your head, but this was an exception." The final version of "Hard to Love" was fully recorded by Blackpink member Rosé at The Black Label in Seoul, South Korea.

"Hard to Love" is an upbeat blend of dance, guitar pop, pop-rock, and lite-disco, infused with elements of '90s rock and roll and edgy pop. The track has a city pop-like feel, built around soft piano, funk-inspired guitar riffs, disco-style handclaps, "glowing" neo-soul keys, and a "thick" bass groove. In the lyrics, the singer expresses hidden insecurities about their ability to be loved. Rosé tells the female perspective, describing how a woman can "make it feel like heaven" and then end up hurting the lover: "Never meant to cause you a problem/Here I am, yet once again/With the same old story". The song is performed in the key of F major with a tempo of 105 beats per minute in common time.

== Commercial performance ==
"Hard to Love" debuted at number 27 on the Billboard Global 200 and at number 19 on the Billboard Global Excl. US. In South Korea, the song debuted at number 146 and peaked at number 87 on the Circle Digital Chart, and also peaked at number 22 on Billboard's South Korea Songs chart. It debuted at number 65 on the ARIA Singles Chart and at number 68 on the Canadian Hot 100, and also reached the top ten in Malaysia, New Zealand, the Philippines, Singapore, and Vietnam.

== Accolades ==
At year-end award ceremonies, "Hard to Love" received a nomination for Artist of the Year – Global Digital Music (September) at the 12th Circle Chart Music Awards alongside Born Pink's other songs "Shut Down", "Typa Girl", and "The Happiest Girl", with "Shut Down" ultimately winning the award.

== Credits and personnel ==
Credits adapted from the liner notes of Born Pink.

Recording

- Recorded at The Black Label Studio (Seoul)
- Mixed at Gudwin Music Group Inc
- Mastered at Sterling Sound (New York City)

Personnel

- Rosé – vocals
- Bianca Atterberry – lyricist, composer
- Freddy Wexler – lyricist, composer
- Max Wolfgang – lyricist, composer
- Teddy – lyricist, composer, creative director
- 24 – composer, arranger
- R.Tee – composer, arranger
- Youngju Bang – recording engineer
- Josh Gudwin – mixing engineer
- Chris Gehringer – mastering engineer

== Charts ==
=== Weekly charts ===
Weekly chart performance for "Hard To Love"
Chart (2022)	Peak position
Australia (ARIA)	65
Canada Hot 100 (Billboard)	68
Global 200 (Billboard)	27
Hungary (Single Top 40)	22
Hong Kong (Billboard)	12
Indonesia (Billboard)	14
Malaysia (Billboard)	4
New Zealand Hot Singles (RMNZ)	6
Philippines (Billboard)	7
Portugal (AFP)	188
Singapore (RIAS)	5
South Korea (Circle)	87
Taiwan (Billboard)	13
Vietnam Hot 100 (Billboard)	5

=== Monthly charts ===
Monthly chart performance for "Hard to Love"
Chart (2022)	Peak position
South Korea (Circle)	161

== See also ==
- List of K-pop songs on the Billboard charts
