= Stony Skunk =

South Korean reggae duo (2003–2008)

- Origin: South Korea
- Genres: reggae, hip hop, rap
- Years active: 2003–2008
- Label: YG Entertainment
- Members: Kush, Skull

Stony Skunk (Korean: 스토니 스컹크; RR: Seutoni Seukunkeu) was a South Korean reggae and hip hop duo. They started as an underground band, then were signed by YG Entertainment. Their first album was released in 2003, titled "Stony Skunk". In 2008, when Skull joined the army they disbanded, it was announced in 2010 that they had disbanded in 2008; Skull left the company at that time. Kush became a producer and songwriter at YG Entertainment using two aliases, Kush and e.knock. He produced several songs for Big Bang and 2NE1. While Skull formed his own company called ‘Lion’ and changed his name to “Skul1” but shortly after joined ‘Brand New Music’.

== Members ==
- Skull (조성진)
- Kush (김병훈)

== Discography ==
- Stony Skunk (2003)
- Ragga Muffin (2005)
- Skunk Riddim (2006)
- More Fyah (2007)
