= Blackpink videography =

Blackpink video discography
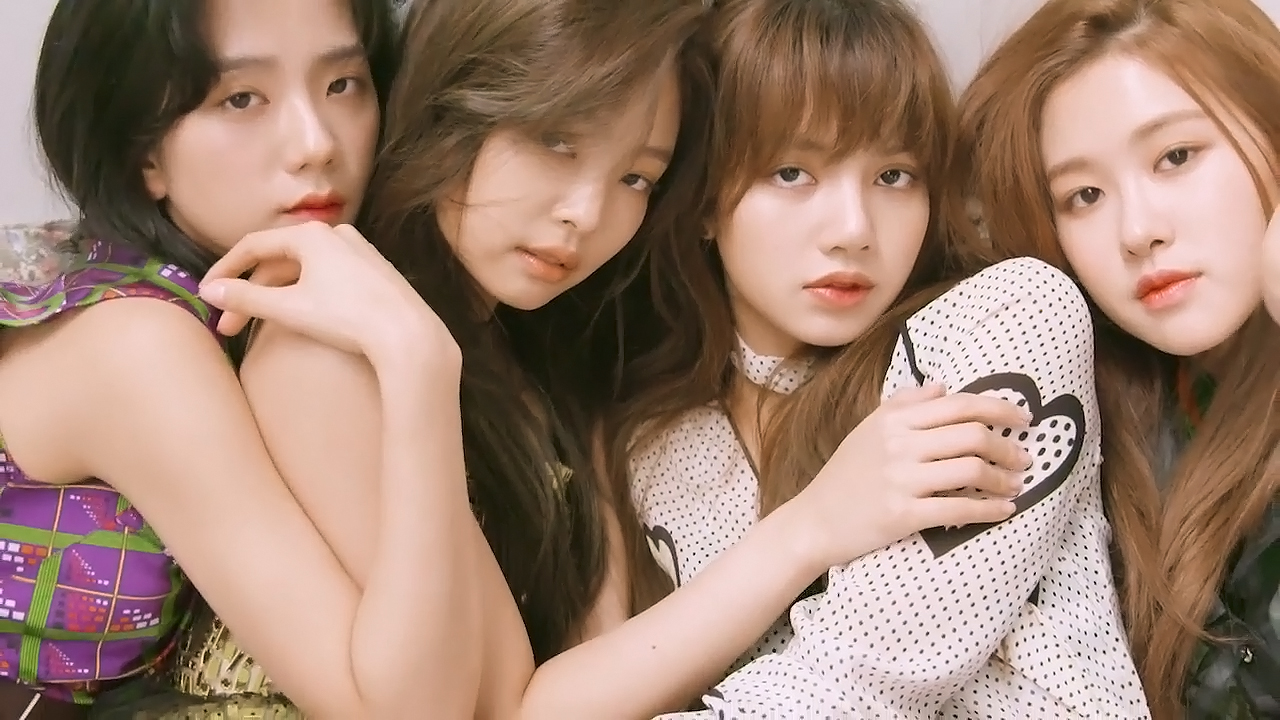
- Blackpink for Marie Claire Korea, February 2018
- Video albums: 11
- Music videos: 16

The videography of South Korean group Blackpink consists of 16 music videos and 11 video albums.

== Music videos ==
Music Video	Year	Director(s)	Length	Ref.
"Whistle" (휘파람)	2016	Jo Beomjin	3:51	
"Boombayah" (붐바야)	2016	Seo Hyun-seung	4:04	
"Playing with Fire" (불장난)	2016	Seo Hyun-seung	3:29	
"Stay"	2016	Han Sa-min	4:01	
"As If It's Your Last" (마지막처럼)	2017	Seo Hyun-seung	3:37	
"Ddu-Du Ddu-Du" (뚜두뚜두)	2018	Seo Hyun-seung	3:36	
"Kill This Love"	2019	Seo Hyun-seung	3:14	
"How You Like That"	2020	Seo Hyun-seung	3:04	
"Ice Cream"	2020	Seo Hyun-seung	3:03	
"Lovesick Girls"	2020	Seo Hyun-seung	3:22	
"Ready for Love"	2022	—N/a	3:06	
"Pink Venom"	2022	Seo Hyun-seung	3:14	
"Shut Down"	2022	Seo Hyun-seung	3:00	
"The Girls"	2023	—N/a	2:44	
"Jump" (뛰어)	2025	Dave Meyers	3:13	
"Go"	2026	Rima Yoon	3:21	

== Albums ==
=== Live video albums ===
Title	Album details	Peak chart positions		Sales
Title	Album details	JPN DVD	JPN BD	Sales
Blackpink Arena Tour 2018 "Special Final In Kyocera Dome Osaka"	Released: March 22, 2019; Label: YGEX; Formats: DVD, Blu-ray, digital download	9	17	JPN: 6,549
Blackpink 2018 Tour 'In Your Area' Seoul	Released: August 30, 2019; Label: YG Entertainment; Formats: DVD, digital download	—	—	
Blackpink 2019-2020 World Tour In Your Area - Tokyo Dome	Released: May 6, 2020; Label: Universal Music; Formats: DVD, Blu-ray, digital download	1	1	JPN: 15,101
Blackpink 2021 'The Show' Live	Released: June 18, 2021; Label: YG Entertainment; Formats: DVD, digital download	—	—	
"—" denotes a release that did not chart or was not released in that region.

=== Other video albums ===
Title	Details	Peak chart positions	
Title	Details	JPN DVD	JPN BD
Blackpink's 2019 Welcoming Collection	Released: February 24, 2019; Label: YG Entertainment; Formats: DVD	—	—
Blackpink House	Released: March 13, 2019 (EP 1–6); Label: YG Entertainment, YGEX; Formats: DVD, Blu-ray	66	52
Blackpink House	Released: March 13, 2019 (EP 7–12); Label: YG Entertainment, YGEX; Formats: DVD, Blu-ray	69	53
2019 Blackpink's Summer Diary [in Hawaii]	Release date: September 9, 2019; Label: YG Entertainment; Formats: DVD	—	—
Blackpink's 2020 Welcoming Collection	Released: March 4, 2020; Label: YG; Formats: DVD	—	—
2020 Blackpink's Summer Diary [in Seoul]	Release date: August 31, 2020; Label: YG Entertainment; Formats: DVD	—	—
Blackpink 5th Anniversary [4+1] 2021 Summer Diary	Release date: August 25, 2021; Label: YG Entertainment; Formats: DVD, KiT	—	—
Blackpink's 2022 Welcoming Collection	Release date: March 2, 2022; Label: YG Entertainment; Formats: Digital code card	—	—
"—" denotes a release that did not chart or was not released in that region.

== See also ==
- Blackpink discography
