= Born Pink World Tour =

2022–23 concert tour by Blackpink

- World tour by Blackpink
- Born Pink World Tour logo
- Location: Asia; Europe; North America; Oceania
- Associated album: Born Pink
- Start date: October 15, 2022
- End date: September 17, 2023
- No. of shows: 66
- Attendance: 1.8 million
- Box office: $330 million

Blackpink concert chronology
- Blackpink: The Virtual (2022); Born Pink World Tour (2022–23); Deadline World Tour (2025–26)

The Born Pink World Tour was the second worldwide concert tour and the third overall by South Korean girl group Blackpink in support of their second studio album Born Pink (2022). The tour began on October 15, 2022, in Seoul, South Korea, and a stadium encore leg began on July 15, 2023, in Saint-Denis, France. The tour concluded on September 17, 2023, in Seoul, South Korea, comprising 66 concerts in 22 countries.

The Born Pink World Tour ranked at number ten on Billboard's 2023 Year End Top 40 Tours chart and earned a worldwide gross of $330 million, breaking the record for the highest-grossing concert tour by a female group and Asian artist in history at the time. In total, the tour was attended by 1.8 million people, making it the most-attended concert tour by a K-pop girl group.

== Background ==
On July 6, 2022, YG Entertainment confirmed that Blackpink would release new music and embark on the largest world tour by a K-pop girl group in history later in the year. On July 31, it was revealed that the group's second Korean studio album Born Pink would be released in September, followed by the world tour starting in October. On August 8, Blackpink announced 36 shows from October 2022 to June 2023 spanning Asia, North America, Europe, and Oceania, with more dates to be added in the future. On September 6, the group unveiled the dates and venues for the North American and European legs of the tour. On October 6, Blackpink released two teaser images of the tour's visual setup, one featuring a black space with clouds of white smoke, and the other featuring a garden-like setting. The tour opened with two concerts on October 15 and 16, 2022, at the KSPO Dome in Seoul, South Korea, which were attended by over 20,000 people. On October 28, the group revealed the dates and venues for the Asian leg of the tour. They announced four dome concerts in two cities in Japan, Tokyo and Osaka, on December 7.

On January 9, 2023, Blackpink announced four additional shows for the Asian leg of the tour in Singapore, Macau and Kaohsiung. On January 31, Blackpink announced ticketing details for the concerts in Australia and that the originally announced Auckland concert was no longer feasible due to "unforeseen logistical challenges." It was also announced that Blackpink would tour for the first time in Mexico City. As part of the encore leg of the tour, Blackpink announced a stadium concert in Paris on March 23, and several stadium concerts in United States on April 16. On June 26, the group announced two shows in Hanoi on July 29 and 30, before their United States encore shows. On August 16, the finale shows in Seoul were announced.

== Production ==
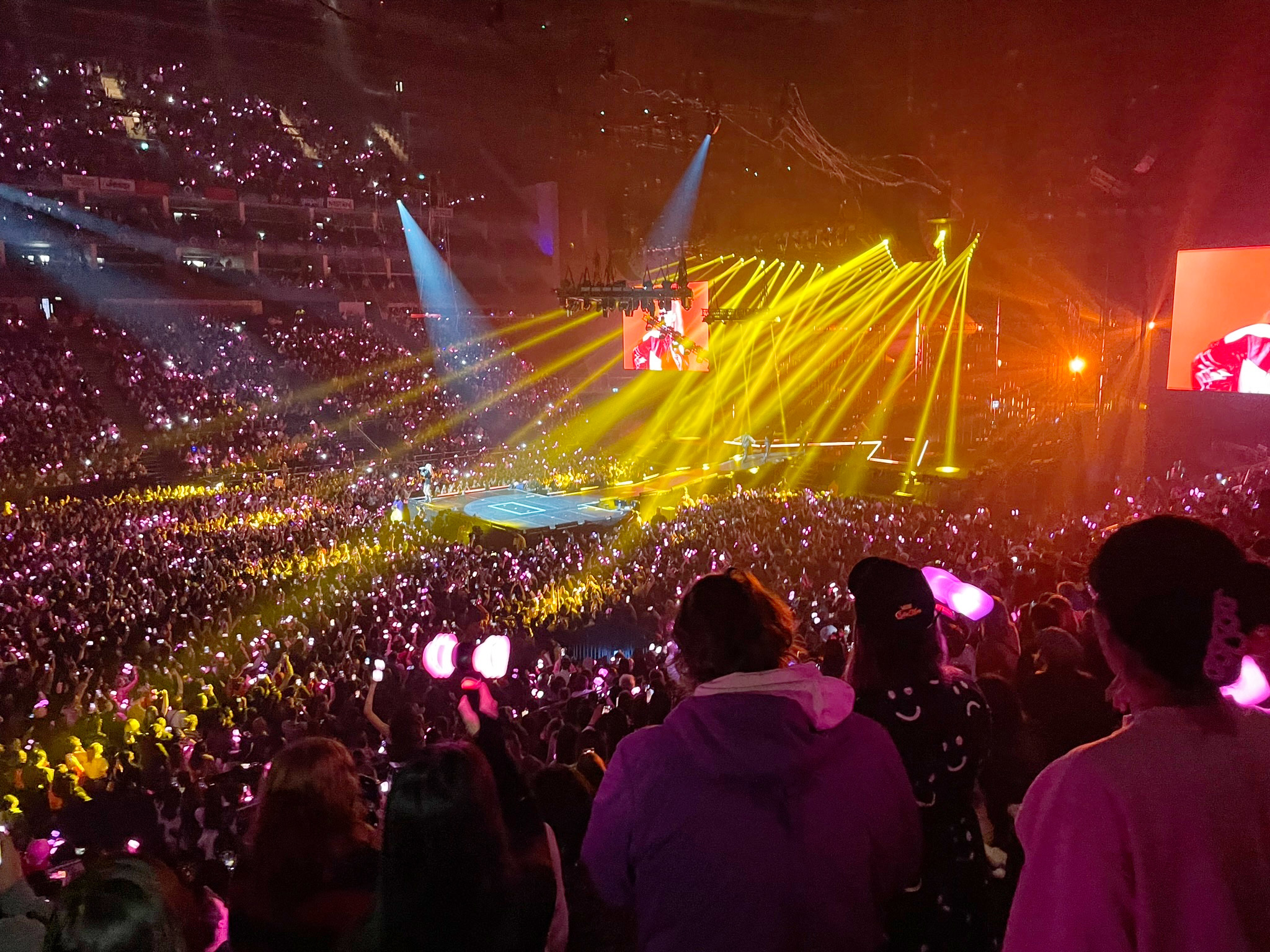
The O2 Arena in London during Blackpink's concert

According to the tour's creative director Amy Bowerman, the show was conceived as a celebration of Blackpink's dual identity, as well as the individuality of the members. Split into four acts, the first act takes place in an enchanted garden and showcases Blackpink's "pink" side. Bowerman described it as a "woodland, nymph-esque world where it's very flirty and feminine." However, certain scenes hint at the group's darker side, with grotesque floral imagery such as a lily leaking metallic liquid and higher-energy music. The second act leans more into the mature aspect of Blackpink, featuring a "heavy monochrome that's very harsh and powerful." The lead single of Born Pink, "Pink Venom", was intended to be the focal point of the show; at the end of the second act, it serves as the turning point at which the color pink first appears in the production and is used heavily thereafter. The third act highlights each member as an individual with solo performances and a "weird trippy mix" of colors. The fourth and final act celebrates Blackpink's concept of duality as a whole, with imagery of dichotomies such as water and earth or fire and ice featured prominently.

To produce the Born Pink World Tour, YG Entertainment approached Ceremony London—a visual production company that previously worked with artists such as Post Malone, Rina Sawayama, Holly Humberstone and Dua Lipa—providing the music and choreography of Born Pink in order to do so. The production was ultimately a multilateral, collaborative effort between YG Entertainment's fully-female production team, the group's American band and music director, and Ceremony London. Bowerman described the evolution of the show's concept as an "organic" process. Blackpink themselves were heavily involved in the show's planning and provided their input, especially regarding the set list. As they rehearsed for the tour, they determined which songs fit together and when, resulting in changes to the visuals, movements, and stage; however, "Pink Venom" remained the show's focal point. Fan interactions were also considered during the development of the show, with time allotted for Blackpink to spend engaging with their fans, called "Blinks".

== Concert synopsis ==
The show begins with a video interlude depicting Blackpink in an enchanted garden, after which the group rises from above the stage. Blackpink performs their harder-hitting songs "How You Like That", "Pretty Savage", and "Whistle", after which they introduce themselves and interact with the audience. The next portion of the setlist showcases the group's softer side with the songs "Don't Know What to Do" and "Lovesick Girls". The members then depart the stage for a costume change.

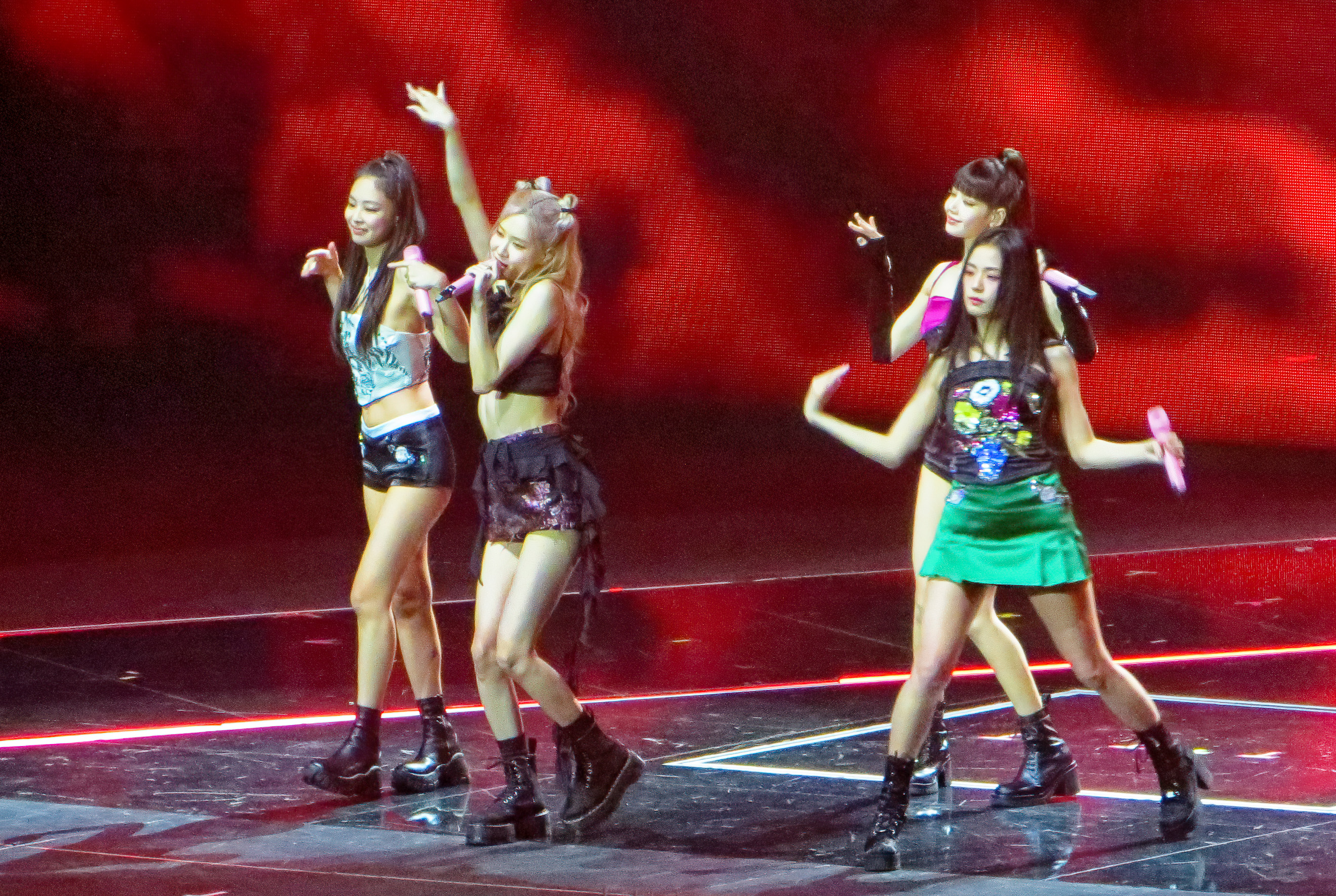
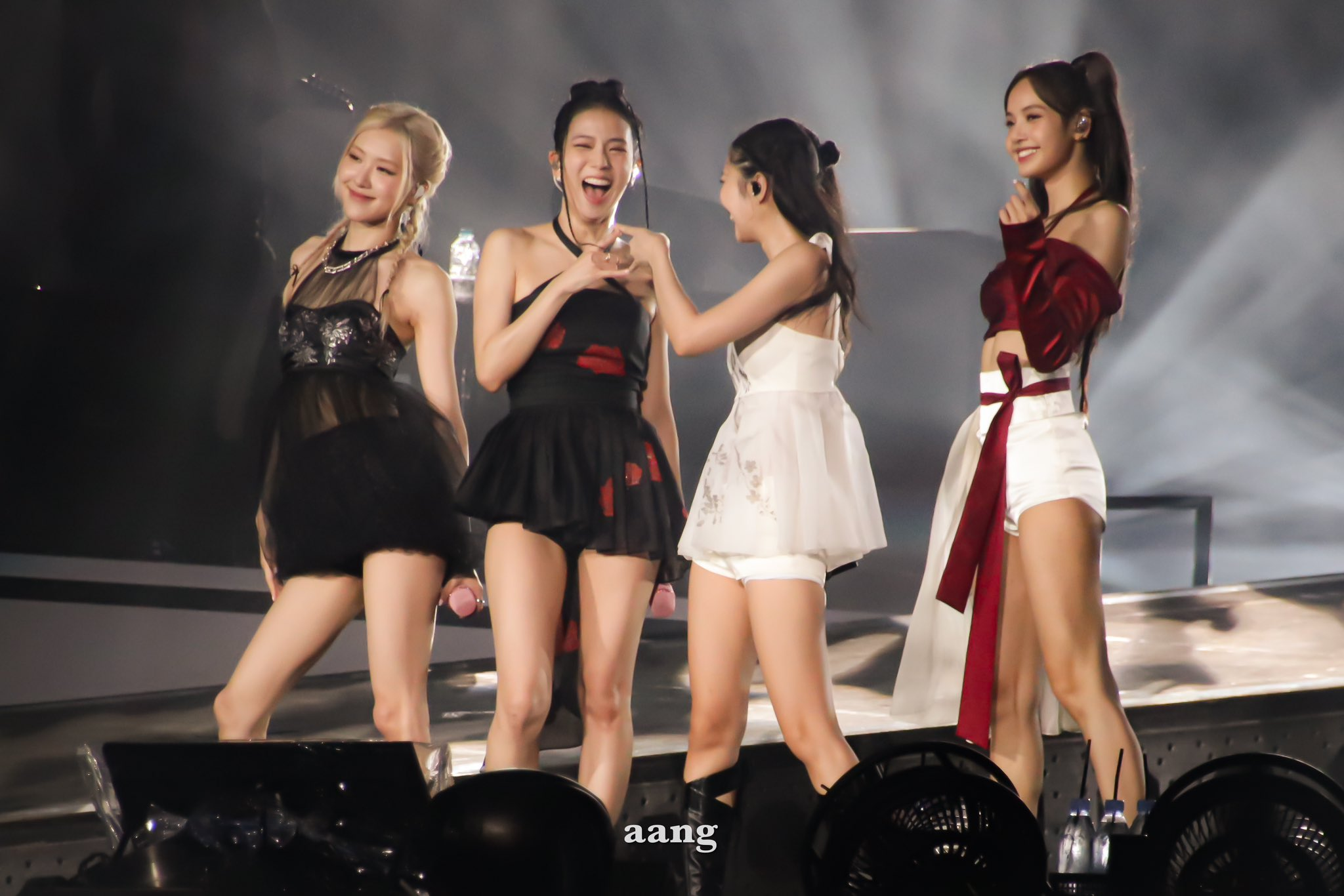
Blackpink performing "Kill This Love" in London (top) and the group performing "Really" in Hanoi (bottom)

The second act of the concert begins with a black-and-white video interlude of Blackpink in a dystopian setting. They return to the stage with "Kill This Love", followed by "Crazy Over You", "Playing with Fire", "Tally", and "Pink Venom". Afterward, the members depart for a costume change, while the dancers participate in a dance circle onstage and the touring band plays guitar, bass, drum, and keyboard solos. The third act of the concert features solo performances by the members, each preceded by backdrops with their names on the main stage screen. Jisoo commences with a cover of Camila Cabello's "Liar", which is replaced by her song "Flower" from the Tokyo shows onwards. Jennie is next, performing her song "You & Me" as a partnered dance with dimmed lighting and a backdrop of their projected silhouettes. The third solo performance is by Rosé, who sings her songs "Hard to Love" and "On the Ground". Finally, Lisa performs a shortened version of her song "Lalisa" followed by her song "Money", which includes a pole dance routine and an extended dance break.

After another video interlude, Blackpink returns as a group for the fourth act of the concert and performs "Shut Down" and "Typa Girl". The members then pause to interact with the audience and teach the key choreography for the next song, "Ddu-Du Ddu-Du", whose performance features an extended dance break. The last song of the act is "Forever Young", after which Blackpink bids their goodbyes and departs the stage. However, Blackpink returns for an encore in casual shirts and sweatshirts from their tour's merchandise line. They perform "Yeah Yeah Yeah" and "Stay", taking different sides of the stage to dance with the audience and play with the cameras. Blackpink ends with "As If It's Your Last" and says a final goodbye before exiting the stage.

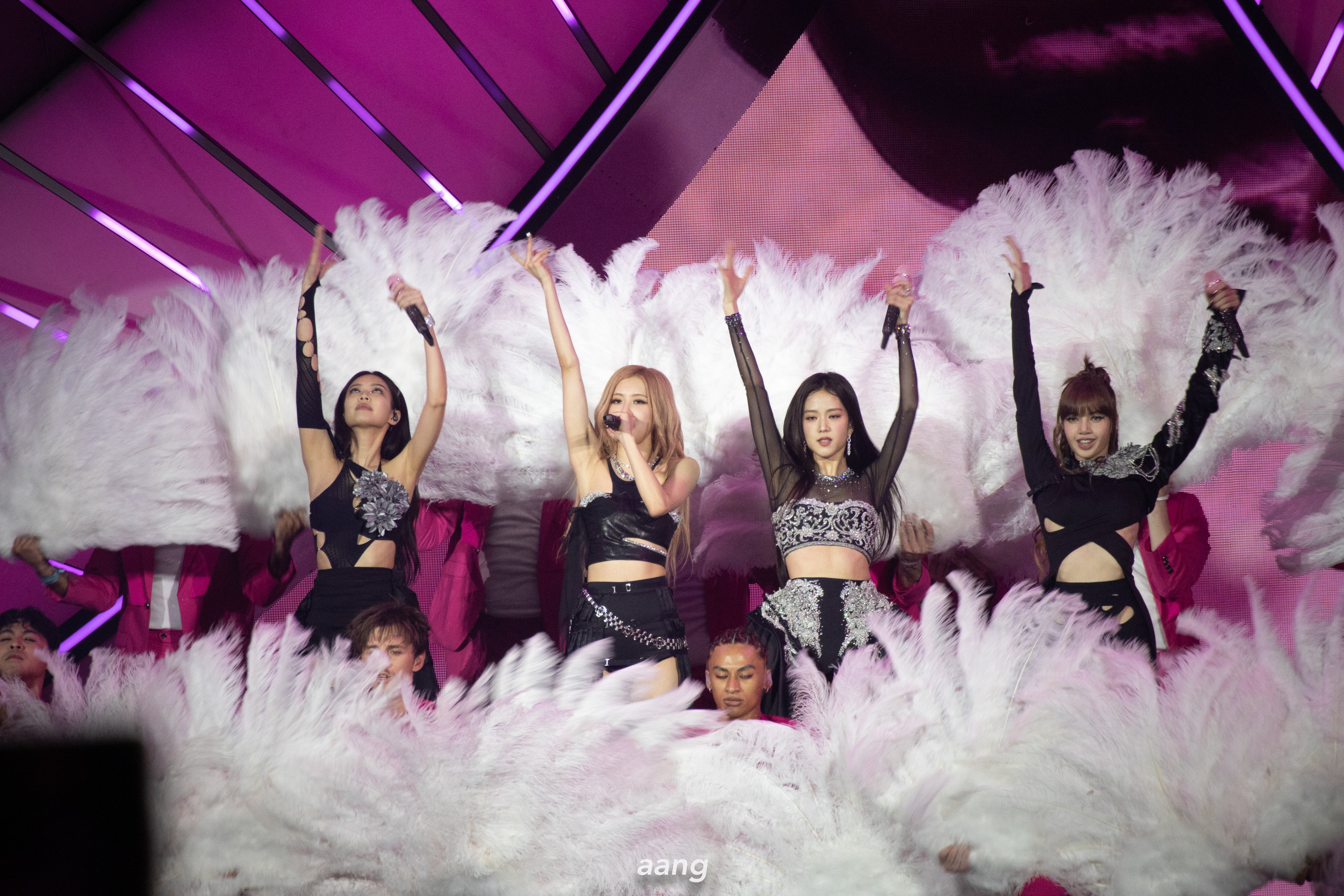
Blackpink performing "Typa Girl" as part of their headlining set at Coachella 2023.

The encore stadium shows in France and the United States feature a completely revamped setlist and stage design which was first performed on the group's headlining appearances at the Coachella Valley Music and Arts Festival and British Summer Time Hyde Park. The majority of the video interludes are absent from the show. "Pink Venom" starts off the new setlist with an explosive extended intro involving the backup dancers. "Pretty Savage" features a new chair dance break, after which Blackpink performs "Kick It" while sitting. For her solo stage, Jennie performs a remixed version of "You & Me" followed by her song "Solo". Jisoo performs her song "All Eyes on Me" followed by a shortened version of "Flower". Rosé performs a shortened version of her song "Gone" followed by "On the Ground". Lisa performs an explicit version of "Money" with an extended dance break. The performance of "Typa Girl" includes new choreography involving giant feathers and a new extended intro. The show ends with a series of fireworks as the members thank the audience and depart.

== Reception ==
Tamar Herman of Variety praised Blackpink's energy and connection with fans, writing that each member "vacillated throughout the show between a sense of exuberance and pure intensity" and explained that they "hit their marks sometimes with intense fierceness and at others grinning while pulling another member towards the camera to do their part when they were busy playing with fans". Reviewing the Dallas show, Consequence highlighted the group's impact "could be clocked before you even entered the building".

Writing for Evening Standard, Ali Shutler rated the tour five out of five stars, calling it "cherry-picked from a range of familiar genres to create something fresh and throughout the show, it felt like the four performers continued pop's long-standing legacy of girl power". Likewise The Telegraph, Neil McCormick gave the same concerts four out of five stars, calling it "extraordinary". Alexis Petridis of The Guardian and Rhian Daly of NME gave the tour four out of five stars, with the former regarding it as "exceptionally well made and high-impact". and the latter called the show "the largest of its kind for a girl group in K-pop history".

On the other hand, Le Parisien called the group's concert at Stade de France the "worst international concert this summer", writing that "Just because audiences filled the State De France doesn't mean the performance is good", criticizing the choreography for being "too textbook" and that "the members would often walk in front of each other due to miscommunication".

=== Accolades ===
Year	Ceremony	Category	Result	Ref.
2023	Billboard Music Awards	Top K-Pop Touring Artist	Won	
2023	MTV Video Music Awards	Show of the Summer	Nominated	
2024	Nickelodeon Kids' Choice Awards	Favorite Ticket of the Year	Nominated	

== Commercial performance ==
All host countries of the Born Pink World Tour

The Born Pink World Tour drew 1.8 million attendees in total, making it the most-attended concert tour by a K-pop girl group. The attendees included 55,000 people in Seoul, 540,000 people in North America, 215,000 people in Europe, 900,000 in Asia, 50,000 in Oceania, and 40,000 in the Middle East. Blackpink ranked at number ten on Billboard's 2023 Year End Top 40 Tours chart and led the ranking of top K-pop tours of the year from the gross of only 29 out of 66 shows, as the group's Asian shows were not reported to Billboard. From the 29 shows, the group grossed $148.3 million and sold 703,000 tickets. In total, from all 66 shows the group grossed $330 million, becoming the sixth highest-grossing tour by a female artist, the highest by a female group, and the highest for an Asian artist in history. They broke the record held by Spice Girls' Spice World – 2019 Tour, which grossed $78.2 million, for the highest-grossing concert tour by a female group.

On Pollstar's year-end report of the top 200 worldwide tours of 2022, Blackpink grossed $12.6 million and sold 47,362 tickets from only four reported shows in two cities. Two of the four reported shows were held at Prudential Center in Newark, which grossed $6,595,517 and sold 23,928 tickets. On Pollstar's mid-year report of the top 100 worldwide tours from November 2022 to May 2023, Blackpink grossed $21,363,484 and sold 128,845 tickets from only three reported shows. Two of the three reported shows were held at Foro Sol in Mexico City, which grossed $19,938,131 and sold 113,498 tickets. On Pollstar's year-end report of the top 200 worldwide tours of 2023, Blackpink grossed $61,468,319 and sold 299,080 tickets from only twelve reported shows in nine cities, leading the ranking of top K-pop tours of the year. In North America specifically, they grossed $46,714,227 and sold 203,964 tickets from only five reported shows in three cities. These included the two shows at Foro Sol in Mexico City, as well as two shows at the Banc of California Stadium in Los Angeles, which grossed $15,346,966 and sold 46,295 tickets.

Blackpink set numerous venue-based records throughout the Born Pink World Tour. In North America, they became the first girl group to perform at Allegiant Stadium in Las Vegas, Oracle Park in San Francisco, and Dodger Stadium in Los Angeles. Blackpink was the third female act after Beyoncé and Taylor Swift to sell out back-to-back shows at MetLife Stadium in East Rutherford. They were also the first K-pop act to perform at a stadium in Mexico. Blackpink became the first K-pop girl group to perform at a stadium in Europe with their concert at Stade de France in Saint-Denis. In Asia, they became the first K-pop act to perform at stadiums in Malaysia, Indonesia, the Philippines, and Vietnam, and the first female act to perform at National Stadium in Bangkok. Blackpink also broke the record for the highest attendance for a concert by a K-pop act in Singapore. In the Middle East, they were first solo K-pop act to perform at Etihad Park in Abu Dhabi and the first girl group to perform at BLVD International Festival in Riyadh. With their finale shows, Blackpink became the first girl group to hold a solo concert at Gocheok Sky Dome in Seoul as well.

== Set list ==
=== October 2022 to July 2023 ===
This set list was taken from the show in Seoul on October 16, 2022. It does not represent all shows throughout the tour.

Act 1

1. "How You Like That"
2. "Pretty Savage"
3. "Whistle" (shortened)
4. "Don't Know What to Do"
5. "Lovesick Girls"

Act 2

6. "Kill This Love"
7. "Crazy Over You"
8. "Playing with Fire" (shortened)
9. "Tally"
10. "Pink Venom"

Act 3 – Solos

11. "Liar" (Camila Cabello cover) (Jisoo solo)
12. "You & Me" (Jennie solo)
13. "Hard to Love" (Rosé solo)
14. "On the Ground" (Rosé solo)
15. "Lalisa" (Lisa solo)
16. "Money" (Lisa solo)

Act 4

17. "Shut Down"
18. "Typa Girl"
19. "Ddu-Du Ddu-Du" (extended)
20. "Forever Young"

Encore

21. "Boombayah"
22. "Yeah Yeah Yeah"
23. "Stay" (remix)
24. "As If It's Your Last"

==== Alterations ====
- "Stay" was not performed at the first show in Seoul and the first show in Dallas
- "Boombayah" was temporary removed from the setlist, starting with the first show in Houston until the second show in Tokyo, except at shows in Barcelona, Cologne, Paris, and the second show in Bocaue. It was later cut from both shows in Osaka.
- At the second show in Newark, Jisoo performed "Liar" solo after Lisa.
- At the first show in Los Angeles, Camila Cabello joined Jisoo on stage to perform "Liar".
- "Last Christmas" was performed during the encore of Amsterdam show to celebrate the upcoming Christmas.
- "Flower" replaced "Liar" after the release of Me, starting with the first show in Tokyo.
- “Yeah Yeah Yeah” was removed from the setlist starting with the first show in Singapore, only returned at the Osaka shows.
- "Stay" replaced "Playing with Fire" in both Singapore shows.
- Starting from the first encore show in Bangkok, "Gone" replaced "Hard to Love", and "Lalisa" was cut from the setlist.
- A remix of "Ddu-Du Ddu-Du" was performed after "Boombayah" at the second Bangkok encore show.
- Both Hanoi shows used this setlist, with "Stay" and "Really" replacing "Playing with Fire" and "Tally", respectively. A snippet of "See Tình" by Hoàng Thùy Linh was played after "Typa Girl".

=== July to September 2023 ===
This set list was taken from the show in East Rutherford on August 12, 2023. It does not represent all shows throughout the tour.

Act 1

1. "Pink Venom" (extended)
2. "How You Like That"
3. "Pretty Savage"
4. "Kick It"
5. "Whistle" (shortened)

Act 2 – Solos

6. "You & Me" (Jennie solo; shortened)
7. "Solo" (Jennie solo; shortened)
8. "All Eyes On Me" (Jisoo solo, shortened)
9. "Flower" (Jisoo solo, shortened)
10. "Gone" (Rosé solo; shortened)
11. "On the Ground" (Rosé solo; shortened)
12. "Money" (Lisa solo)

Act 3

13. "Boombayah" (shortened)
14. "Lovesick Girls"
15. "Playing with Fire" (shortened)
16. "Typa Girl"
17. "Shut Down"
18. "Tally"
19. "Ddu-Du Ddu-Du" (extended)
20. "Forever Young"

Encore

21. "Stay" (remix)
22. "Yeah Yeah Yeah"
23. "As If It's Your Last"

==== Alterations ====
- "All Eyes On Me" was not played at the Saint-Denis show
- As noted earlier, both Hanoi shows used the old setlist, with "Hard to Love" replacing "Gone" in the first show.
- To celebrate the group's 7th anniversary, "Happy Birthday To You" was performed during the encore of the first show in East Rutherford.
- "Don't Know What to Do" was added to the setlist after "Shut Down", starting with the show in Paradise.
- Jennie performed The Show version of "Solo" and cut "You & Me" at the encore show in Los Angeles.
- At both finale shows in Seoul, "Boombayah" was moved to the encore, with "Kill This Love" taking its place.

== Tour dates ==
List of concert dates
Date	City	Country	Venue	Attendance	Revenue
October 15, 2022	Seoul	South Korea	KSPO Dome	20,000	—
October 16, 2022	Seoul	South Korea	KSPO Dome	20,000	—
October 25, 2022	Dallas	United States	American Airlines Center	200,000 (Note: For all 14 shows in the North American leg. The two shows in Atlanta drew an attendance of 23,434, the two shows in Newark drew an attendance of 23,928, and the two shows in Los Angeles drew an attendance of 46,295.)	—
October 26, 2022	Dallas	United States	American Airlines Center	200,000	—
October 29, 2022	Houston	United States	Toyota Center	200,000	—
October 30, 2022	Houston	United States	Toyota Center	200,000	—
November 2, 2022	Atlanta	United States	State Farm Arena	200,000	—
November 3, 2022	Atlanta	United States	State Farm Arena	200,000	—
November 6, 2022	Hamilton	Canada	FirstOntario Centre	200,000	—
November 7, 2022	Hamilton	Canada	FirstOntario Centre	200,000	—
November 10, 2022	Chicago	United States	United Center	200,000	—
November 11, 2022	Chicago	United States	United Center	200,000	—
November 14, 2022	Newark	United States	Prudential Center	200,000	$6,595,517
November 15, 2022	Newark	United States	Prudential Center	200,000	$6,595,517
November 19, 2022	Los Angeles	United States	BMO Stadium	200,000	$15,346,966
November 20, 2022	Los Angeles	United States	BMO Stadium	200,000	$15,346,966
November 30, 2022	London	England	The O_{2} Arena	160,000 (Note: For all 10 shows in the European leg. The show in Cologne drew an attendance of 15,347.)	—
December 1, 2022	London	England	The O_{2} Arena	160,000	—
December 5, 2022	Barcelona	Spain	Palau Sant Jordi	160,000	—
December 8, 2022	Cologne	Germany	Lanxess Arena	160,000	$1,425,352
December 11, 2022	Paris	France	Accor Arena	160,000	—
December 12, 2022	Paris	France	Accor Arena	160,000	–
December 15, 2022	Copenhagen	Denmark	Royal Arena	160,000	–
December 19, 2022	Berlin	Germany	Uber Arena	160,000	—
December 20, 2022	Berlin	Germany	Uber Arena	160,000	—
December 22, 2022	Amsterdam	Netherlands	Ziggo Dome	160,000	—
January 7, 2023	Bangkok	Thailand	National Stadium	85,000	—
January 8, 2023	Bangkok	Thailand	National Stadium	85,000	—
January 13, 2023	Hong Kong		AsiaWorld–Arena	30,000	—
January 14, 2023	Hong Kong		AsiaWorld–Arena	30,000	—
January 15, 2023	Hong Kong		AsiaWorld–Arena	30,000	—
January 20, 2023	Riyadh	Saudi Arabia	Boulevard City	40,000	—
January 28, 2023	Abu Dhabi	United Arab Emirates	Etihad Park (Abu Dhabi)	40,000	—
March 4, 2023	Kuala Lumpur	Malaysia	Bukit Jalil National Stadium	63,000	—
March 11, 2023	Jakarta	Indonesia	Gelora Bung Karno Stadium	50,000	—
March 12, 2023	Jakarta	Indonesia	Gelora Bung Karno Stadium	—	—
March 18, 2023	Kaohsiung	Taiwan	National Stadium	90,000	—
March 19, 2023	Kaohsiung	Taiwan	National Stadium	90,000	—
March 25, 2023	Bocaue (Note: Promoted as Manila-Bulacan, disregarding the technical city boundaries.)	Philippines	Philippine Arena	100,000	—
March 26, 2023	Bocaue	Philippines	Philippine Arena	100,000	—
April 8, 2023	Tokyo	Japan	Tokyo Dome; U-Next (Note: April 9 only.)	110,000	—
April 9, 2023	Tokyo	Japan	Tokyo Dome; U-Next	110,000	—
April 26, 2023	Mexico City	Mexico	Foro Sol	113,498	$19,938,131
April 27, 2023	Mexico City	Mexico	Foro Sol	113,498	$19,938,131
May 13, 2023	Singapore		National Stadium	100,000	—
May 14, 2023	Singapore		National Stadium	100,000	—
May 20, 2023	Macau		Galaxy Macau	20,000	—
May 21, 2023	Macau		Galaxy Macau	20,000	—
May 27, 2023	Bangkok (Note: Labeled as Encore)	Thailand	Rajamangala National Stadium	100,000	—
May 28, 2023	Bangkok	Thailand	Rajamangala National Stadium	100,000	—
June 3, 2023 (Note: Jisoo did not perform on this date due to a positive COVID-19 test.)	Osaka	Japan	Kyocera Dome Osaka	100,000	—
June 4, 2023	Osaka	Japan	Kyocera Dome Osaka	100,000	—
June 10, 2023	Melbourne	Australia	Rod Laver Arena	50,000	—
June 11, 2023 (Note: Jennie could not complete the show due to illness and left the stage mid-way through the concert.)	Melbourne	Australia	Rod Laver Arena	50,000	—
June 16, 2023	Sydney	Australia	Qudos Bank Arena	50,000	—
June 17, 2023	Sydney	Australia	Qudos Bank Arena	50,000	—
July 15, 2023	Saint-Denis (Note: Promoted as Paris; labeled as Encore)	France	Stade de France	55,000	—
July 29, 2023	Hanoi	Vietnam	Mỹ Đình National Stadium	70,000	—
July 30, 2023	Hanoi	Vietnam	Mỹ Đình National Stadium	70,000	—
August 11, 2023	East Rutherford (Note: Promoted as New Jersey; labeled as Encore)	United States	MetLife Stadium	230,000 (Note: For all 5 shows in the North American encore leg. The show in Paradise drew an attendance of 44,171.)	—
August 12, 2023	East Rutherford	United States	MetLife Stadium	230,000	—
August 18, 2023	Paradise (Note: Promoted as Las Vegas, labeled as Encore)	United States	Allegiant Stadium	230,000	$11,429,130
August 22, 2023	San Francisco	United States	Oracle Park	230,000	—
August 26, 2023	Los Angeles	United States	Dodger Stadium	230,000	—
September 16, 2023	Seoul (Note: Labeled as Finale)	South Korea	Gocheok Sky Dome	35,000	—
September 17, 2023	Seoul	South Korea	Gocheok Sky Dome	35,000	—
Total				1,800,000	$330,000,000

=== Canceled show ===
Date	City	Country	Venue	Reason
June 21, 2023	Auckland	New Zealand	Venue never confirmed	Unforeseen logistical challenges

== See also ==
- List of highest-grossing concert tours by female groups
