= Blackpink (EP) =

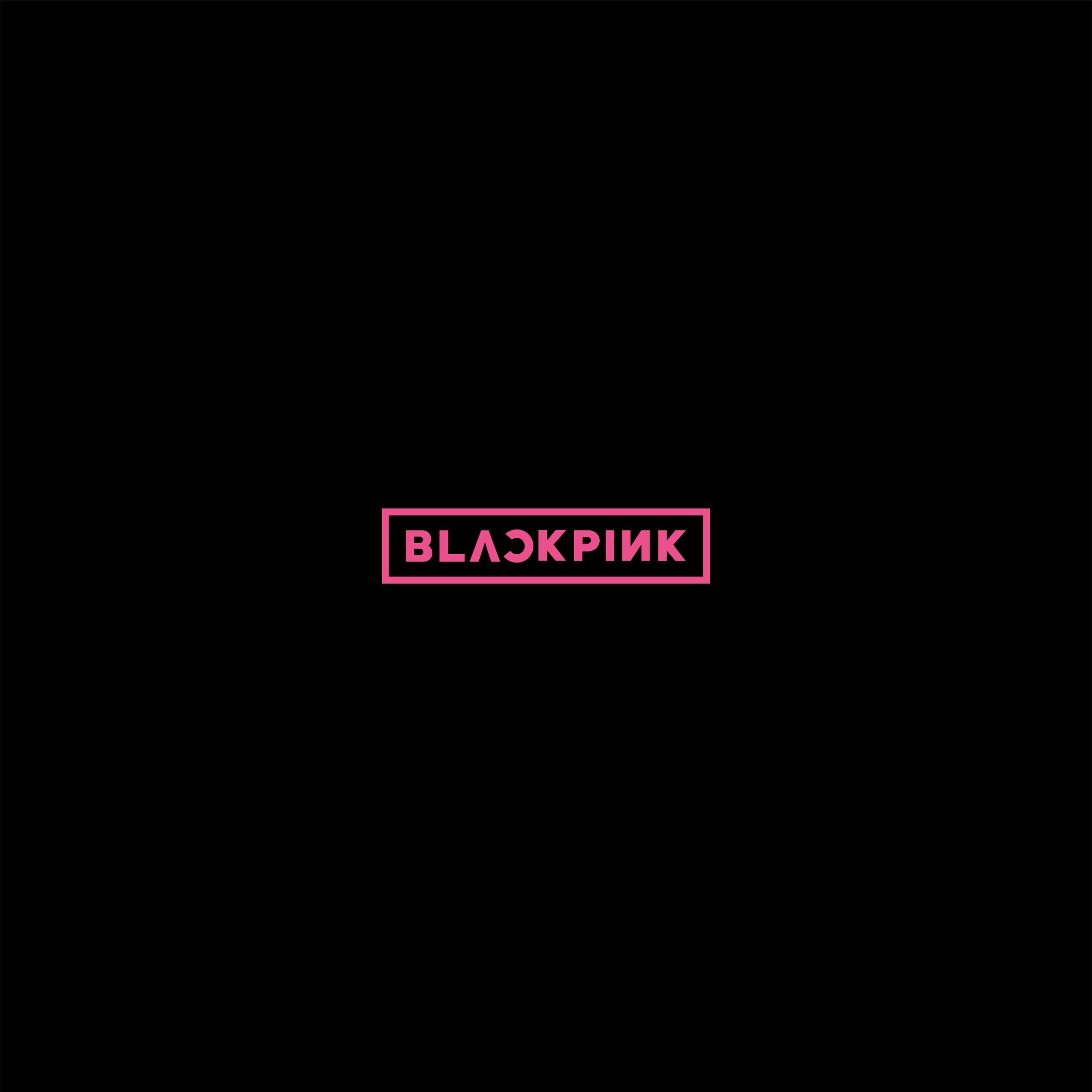
- Digital and CD-only edition cover (Note: The cover art for the first pressing of CD+DVD edition features the black Blackpink logo in pink background)

EP by Blackpink
- Released: August 30, 2017
- Studio: YG (Seoul)
- Genres: J-pop; K-pop; pop rock
- Length: 21:46
- Languages: Japanese; Korean; English
- Label: YGEX
- Producers: Teddy; Bekuh Boom; Future Bounce; R. Tee; 24; Choice37

Blackpink chronology
Square Two (2016)	Blackpink (2017)	Square Up (2018)

Alternative cover
- Reissue cover

Singles from Blackpink
- 1. "Boombayah (JP Ver.)" Released: August 8, 2017

Blackpink is the first Japanese extended play by South Korean girl group Blackpink. It was released digitally in Japan on August 29, 2017 by YGEX, and was released physically on August 30. The six track EP consists of Japanese versions of their previously released Korean singles. The EP debuted atop the Oricon Albums Chart in its daily and weekly charts. The group became the third foreign artist to top the chart with a debut release since 2011.

A reissue of the EP titled Re: Blackpink was released on March 28, 2018.

== Background and composition ==
In May 2017, it was reported that the group would be holding a debut showcase at Nippon Budokan on July 20 and would release their debut album on August 9.

On July 13, it was officially announced that the debut album of the group would be an extended play called Blackpink and would be released on August 30. The music video of "Boombayah" was also released. On the same day, the details from the album were revealed, including the track list. It has two versions: CD+DVD, containing the Japanese and Korean-language versions of the group's singles plus five music videos; and only CD, containing just the Japanese-language songs. The Japanese-language EP compiles three singles previously released in Korean; "Square One" (containing "Boombayah" and "Whistle"), "Square Two" (containing "Playing with Fire" and "Stay") and "As If It's Your Last".

== Promotion ==
In order to promote the upcoming Japan debut on television and internet. The group released the full version of Japanese music video, starting with "Playing with Fire" on MTV Japan on July 10, 2017, "Whistle" on Music On! TV on July 10, 2017, "Stay" on GYAO! on July 11, 2017, "Boombayah" on GYAO! on July 13, 2017, and the last song, "As If It's Your Last" on AbemaTV (K World Channel) on July 16, 2017.

In addition, The group uploaded short versions of their singles in Japanese on the YouTube, starting with "Boombayah" on July 13, and continued with "Whistle" on July 14, "Playing with Fire" on July 15, "Stay" on July 16, and "As If It's Your Last" on July 17.

On August 8, the Japanese version of "Boombayah" was released on iTunes Japan as the promo single of the EP.

== Commercial performance ==
Blackpink debuted atop the Oricon Daily Album Chart on August 29, 2017, with 21,583 physical copies sold in its first day. In its second day, the EP stayed atop the chart. The EP debuted atop the Oricon Weekly Album Chart with 39,100 physical copies sold in its first week. They became the only third foreign artist to record first place on Oricon weekly chart with a debut release. The EP was the fourth best selling album in Japan for August 2017, with 39,100 copies sold.

The EP also topped Billboard Japan's Hot Albums chart for its combined sales.

== Track listing ==
All songs are Japanese versions unless specified.

Blackpink track listing
No.	Title	Lyrics	Music	Arrangement	Length
1.	"Boombayah"	Teddy; Bekuh Boom; Sunny Boy	Teddy; Boom	Teddy	4:01
2.	"Whistle"	Teddy; Boom; Sunny Boy; Kim Han-bin	Teddy; Future Bounce; Boom	Teddy; Future Bounce	3:32
3.	"Playing with Fire"	Teddy; Emyli	Teddy; R. Tee	R. Tee	3:17
4.	"Stay"	Teddy; Emyli	Teddy; Won Jin Seo	Teddy; Won Jin Seo	3:51
5.	"As If It's Your Last"	Teddy; Brother Su; Choice37; Sunny Boy	Teddy; Future Bounce; Lydia Paek	Future Bounce; Teddy	3:32
6.	"Whistle" (Acoustic version)	Teddy; Boom; Sunny Boy; Kim Han-bin	Teddy; Future Bounce; Boom	Won Jin Seo	3:33
Total length:					21:46

Blackpink – CD+DVD edition bonus tracks
No.	Title	Lyrics	Music	Arrangement	Length
7.	"Boombayah" (Korean version)	Teddy; Boom	Teddy; Boom	Teddy	4:01
8.	"Whistle" (Korean version)	Teddy; Boom; Kim Han-bin	Teddy; Future Bounce; Boom	Teddy; Future Bounce	3:31
9.	"Playing with Fire" (Korean version)	Teddy	Teddy; R. Tee	R. Tee	3:17
10.	"Stay" (Korean version)	Teddy	Teddy; Won Jin Seo	Teddy; Won Jin Seo	3:50
11.	"As If It's Your Last" (Korean version)	Teddy; Brother Su; Choice37	Teddy; Future Bounce; Lydia Paek	Future Bounce; Teddy	3:33
12.	"Whistle" (Acoustic version; Korean version)	Teddy; Boom; Kim Han-bin	Teddy; Future Bounce; Boom	Won Jin Seo	3:32
Total length:					43:32

Blackpink – CD+DVD edition (Bonus DVD)
No.	Title	Director/Production	Length
1.	"Boombayah" (Music Video)	Hyun Seong Seo (Gigant)	4:02
2.	"Whistle" (Music Video)	Beomjin Jo (VM Project)	3:32
3.	"Playing with Fire" (Music Video)	Hyun Seong Seo	3:22
4.	"Stay" (Music Video)	Sa Min Han (Dextor-lab)	3:53
5.	"As If It's Your Last" (Music Video)	Hyun Seong Seo	3:33
6.	"Making Video"	Norihiro Ohmori (Stories LLC)	10:45
Total length:			29:07

Re: Blackpink – CD+DVD (reissue bonus DVD tracks)
No.	Title	Director/Production	Length
7.	"Special Interview + Jacket Shooting Making"	Sho Hatano (Oknack)	8:50
8.	"Boombayah" (from Blackpink Premium Debut Showcase, 2017)	YJ Lee (Ennet)	4:11
9.	"Playing With Fire" (from Blackpink Premium Debut Showcase, 2017)	YJ Lee	3:19
10.	"Whistle" (from Blackpink Premium Debut Showcase, 2017)	YJ Lee	3:34
11.	"Stay" (from Blackpink Premium Debut Showcase, 2017)	YJ Lee	3:54
12.	"As If It's Your Last" (from Blackpink Premium Debut Showcase, 2017)	YJ Lee	4:09
13.	"Boombayah" (Korean version (encore); from Blackpink Premium Debut Showcase, 2017)	YJ Lee	5:03
14.	"Boombayah" (from A-Nation, 2017)	Yasuyuki Hoshi (Avex Entertainment)	4:09
15.	"As If It's Your Last" (from A-Nation, 2017)	Yasuyuki Hoshi	3:42
Total length:			69:41

Notes

- Kim Han-bin (B.I) has an uncredited contribution to the lyrics of "Whistle" on Japanese Society for Rights of Authors, Composers and Publishers (JASRAC).

== Charts ==
=== Weekly charts ===
Weekly chart performance for Blackpink
Chart (2017)	Peak position
Japanese Albums (Oricon)	1
Japanese Digital Albums (Oricon)	5
Japanese Download Albums (Billboard Japan)	91
Japanese Hot Albums (Billboard Japan)	1
Japanese Top Album Sales (Billboard Japan)	1

=== Monthly charts ===
Chart (2017)	Peak position
Japanese Albums (Oricon)	4

=== Year-end charts ===
Chart (2017)	Position
Japanese Albums (Oricon)	67
Japanese Hot Albums (Billboard Japan)	93
Japanese Top Album Sales (Billboard Japan)	60

== Certifications and sales ==
Certifications and sales for Blackpink
Region	Certification	Certified units/sales
Japan	—	60,668

== Release history ==
Release dates and formats for Blackpink
Album	Region	Date	Label	Format(s)	Catalog	Ref.
Blackpink	Various	August 29, 2017	YGEX	Digital download; streaming	—N/a	
Blackpink	Japan	August 30, 2017	YGEX	CD+DVD	AVCY-58498/B	
Blackpink	Japan	August 30, 2017	YGEX	CD	AVCY-58499	
Blackpink	Japan	August 30, 2017	YGEX	Playbutton	AVZY-58501	
Blackpink	Japan	August 30, 2017	YGEX	CD (YGEX Shop limited type A)	AVC1-58502	
Blackpink	Japan	August 30, 2017	YGEX	CD (YGEX Shop limited type B)	AVC1-58502	
Re: Blackpink	Various	March 28, 2018	YGEX	Digital download; streaming	—N/a	
Re: Blackpink	Japan	March 28, 2018	YGEX	CD+DVD	AVCY-58580/B	
Re: Blackpink	Japan	March 28, 2018	YGEX	CD	AVCY-58581	
Re: Blackpink	Japan	March 28, 2018	YGEX	Playbutton	AVZY-58582	
