= List of Inkigayo Chart winners (2016) =

Inkigayo Chart winners (2016)

Highlights
- Artist(s) with most wins: Twice & GFriend (6)
- Song with highest score: "Monster" by Exo (11,000)

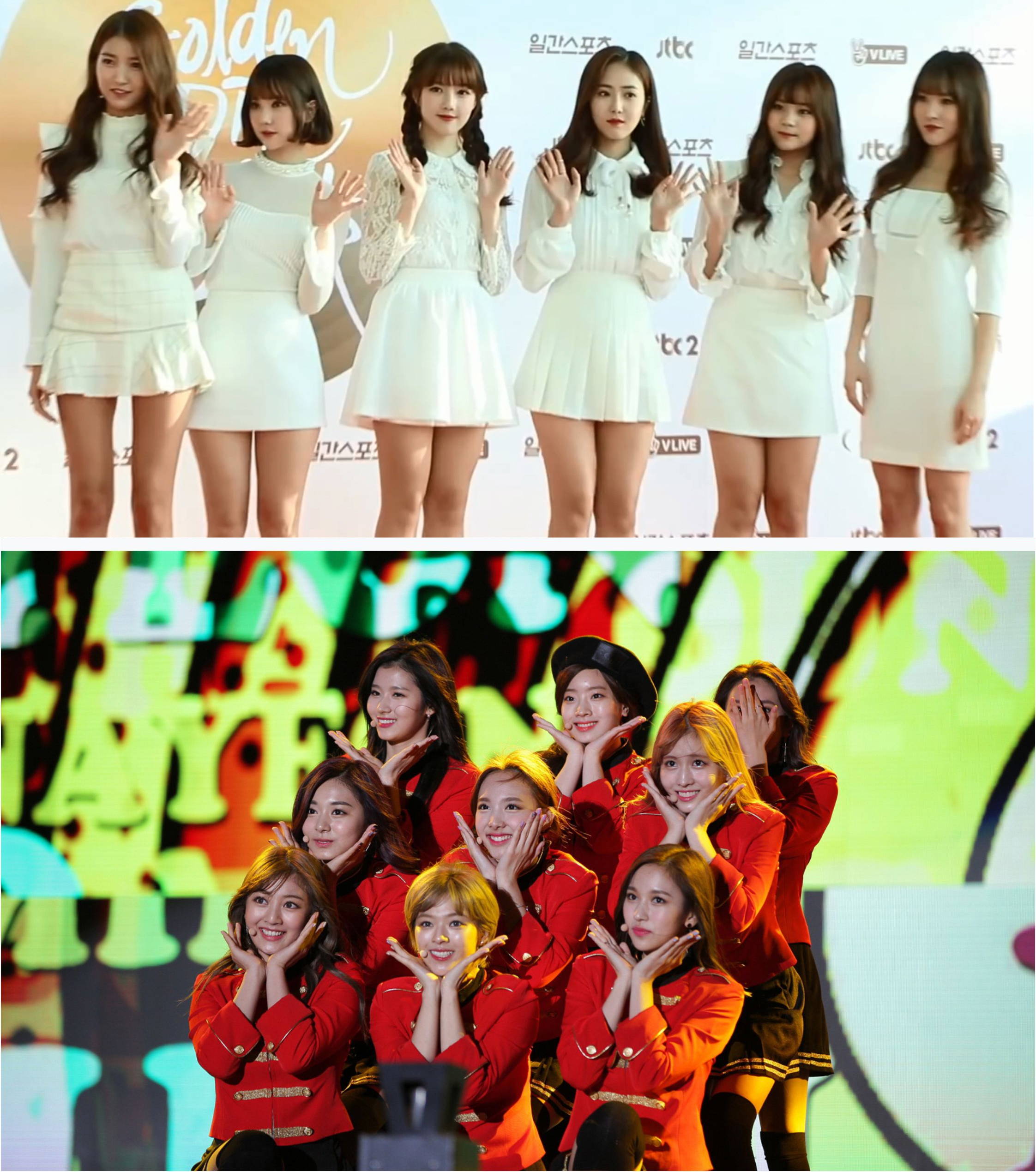
Girl groups GFriend (top) and Twice (bottom) earned their first Inkigayo awards with "Rough" and "Cheer Up", respectively. Both collected two Triple Crowns, the most of any act in 2016.

The Inkigayo Chart is a music program record chart that gives an award to the best-performing single of the week in South Korea. The chart measured digital performance in domestic online music services (5,500 points), social media via YouTube views (3,500 points), advanced viewer votes (500 points), and album sales (500 points) in its ranking methodology. The candidates for the number-one song of the week received additional points from live votes (1,000 points). Songs that spend three weeks at number one are awarded a Triple Crown and are removed from the chart and ineligible to win again. The show was hosted by six different people across the whole year. Kim Yoo-jung, Jackson Wang and Yook Sung-jae had hosted the show together since September 13, 2015. Yoo-jung left the show on April 3, 2016. Wang and Sung-jae continued to host the show till May 29, 2016. The following week Gong Seung-yeon, Jeongyeon and Kim Min-seok were announced as the new hosts of the show.

In 2016, there were 37 singles that ranked number one on the chart and 30 music acts received award trophies for this feat. Nine artists had more than one number one in 2016. Girl groups Blackpink, Twice and GFriend ranked number one on the chart for the first time with "Whistle", "Cheer Up" and "Rough", respectively. The three groups all went on to have another number one in 2016. Blackpink with "Playing with Fire", Twice with "TT" and GFriend with "Navillera". Both singles by Twice and GFriend ranked number one for three weeks each and went on to achieve a triple crown. Both groups ranked number one for six weeks making them the artists with the most wins of the year. The only other girl group to rank two singles at number one in 2016 is Red Velvet achieved with "One of These Nights" and "Russian Roulette". "Dream" by Suzy and Baekhyun ranked number one for three consecutive weeks in January and achieved a triple crown.

Boy groups Got7 and BTS also achieved their first Inkigayo award in 2016 with "Fly" in April and "Fire" in May, respectively. Both groups went on to achieve another number one on the chart in October with "Hard Carry" and "Blood Sweat & Tears", respectively. Other boy groups to rank two singles at number one include Block B with "A Few Years Later" and "Toy", and Exo with "Monster" and "Lotto". On the June 19 broadcast, Exo's "Monster" accumulated a perfect score of 11,000 points making it the single with the highest score of the year. The only soloist to have two number one singles on the chart is Taeyeon with "Rain" and "Why". Upon topping the ranking with "You're the Best", Mamamoo won its first music show award two years and two months after its debut. I.O.I, formed through the first season of the survival reality show Produce 101, achieved their first number one on the chart with "Very Very Very" in October. Besides Taeyeon, three other solo artists achieved their first number one on the chart in 2016. Rapper Gary won his first Inkigayo award for "Lonely Night" despite a lack of promotional activities on music programs. Other first-time Inkigayo winners as soloists include Jung Eun-ji's "Hopefully Sky" and Baek A-yeon's "So-So". The last number one of the year was "Fxxk It" by BigBang which went on to achieve a triple crown in 2017.

== Chart history ==
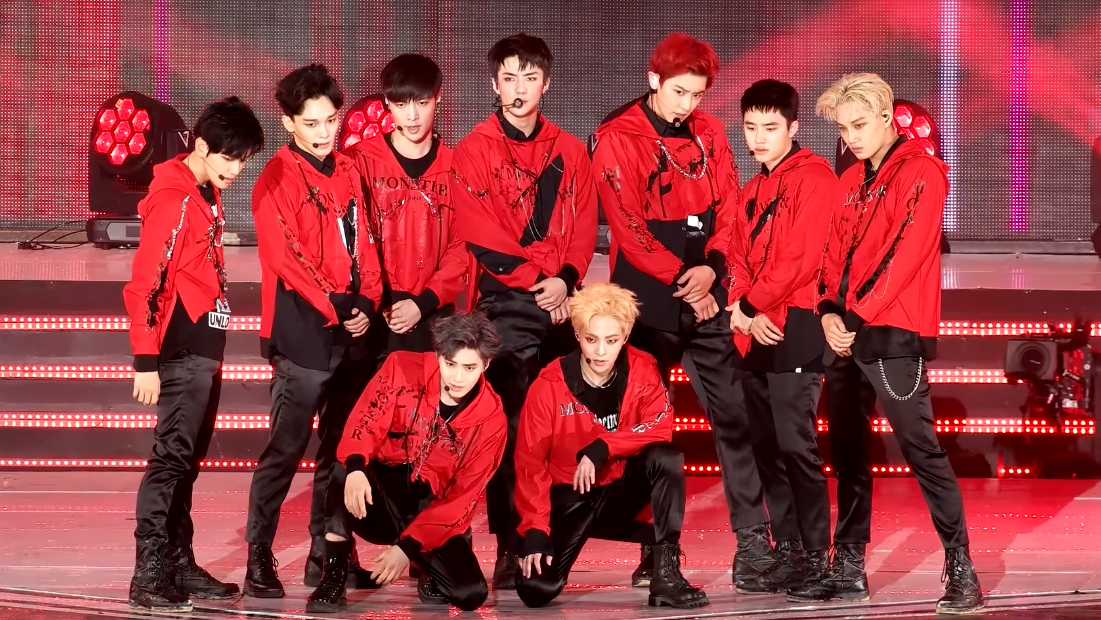
"Monster" accumulated 11,000 points on the June 19 broadcast, earning boy group Exo the highest score of 2016.

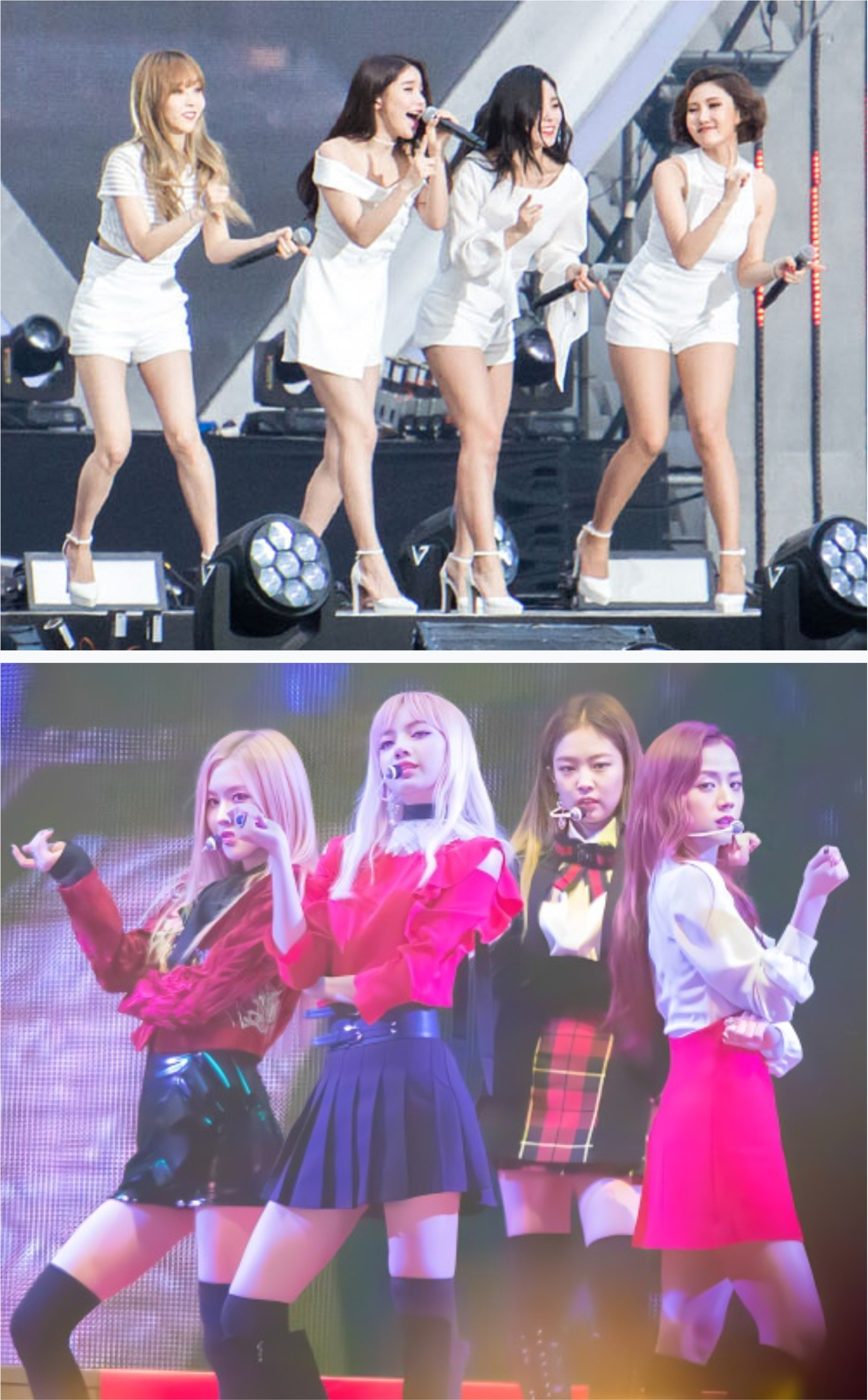
Girl groups Mamamoo (top) and Blackpink (bottom) each earned the first music show award of their careers on Inkigayo for "You're the Best" and "Whistle", respectively.

Key
†	Indicates the song achieved a Triple Crown
‡	Indicates the highest score of the year
—	No show was held

Chart history
Episode	Date	Artist	Song	Points	Ref.
845	January 3	Turbo	"Again"	9,089	
846	January 10	Gary	"Lonely Night"	7,202	
847	January 17	Suzy & Baekhyun	"Dream" †	10,000	
848	January 24	Suzy & Baekhyun	"Dream" †	8,854	
849	January 31	Suzy & Baekhyun	"Dream" †	7,979	
—	February 7	GFriend	"Rough" †	8,881	
850	February 14	Taeyeon	"Rain"	9,797	
851	February 21	GFriend	"Rough" †	9,386	
852	February 28	GFriend	"Rough" †	9,429	
853	March 6	Mamamoo	"You're the Best"	9,433	
854	March 13	Mamamoo	"You're the Best"	9,825	
855	March 20	Lee Hi	"Breathe"	9,194	
856	March 27	Red Velvet	"One of These Nights"	9,495	
857	April 3	Got7	"Fly"	8,938	
858	April 10	Block B	"A Few Years Later"	8,229	
859	April 17	10cm	"What the Spring??"	7,660	
860	April 24	Block B	"Toy"	10,324	
861	May 1	Jung Eun-ji	"Hopefully Sky"	9,334	
862	May 8	Twice	"Cheer Up" †	10,429	
863	May 15	BTS	"Fire"	7,487	
864	May 22	Twice	"Cheer Up" †	9,631	
865	May 29	Twice	"Cheer Up" †	9,543	
866	June 5	Baek A-yeon	"So-So"	7,118	
867	June 12	EXID	"L.I.E"	7,208	
868	June 19	Exo	"Monster"	11,000 ‡	
869	June 26	Exo	"Monster"	9,430	
870	July 3	Sistar	"I Like That"	9,144	
871	July 10	Taeyeon	"Why"	10,557	
872	July 17	Wonder Girls	"Why So Lonely"	9,501	
873	July 24	GFriend	"Navillera" †	10,328	
874	July 31	GFriend	"Navillera" †	10,156	
875	August 7	GFriend	"Navillera" †	10,028	
876	August 14	Hyuna	"How's This?"	7,575	
877	August 21	Blackpink	"Whistle"	9,030	
878	August 28	Exo	"Lotto"	10,122	
879	September 4	Exo	"Lotto"	7,733	
880	September 11	Blackpink	"Whistle"	7,126	
—	September 18	Im Chang-jung	"The Love That I Committed"	6,727	
881	September 25	Red Velvet	"Russian Roulette"	8,226	
882	October 2	Infinite	"The Eye"	7,744	
883	October 9	Got7	"Hard Carry"	9,185	
884	October 16	Shinee	"1 of 1"	8,887	
885	October 23	BTS	"Blood Sweat & Tears"	10,000	
886	October 30	I.O.I	"Very Very Very"	8,893	
887	November 6	Twice	"TT" †	9,782	
888	November 13	Twice	"TT" †	9,978	
889	November 20	Twice	"TT" †	10,256	
890	November 27	Blackpink	"Playing with Fire"	9,083	
891	December 4	Blackpink	"Playing with Fire"	9,019	
892	December 11	Zico	"Bermuda Triangle"	7,582	
893	December 18	Heize	"Star"	6,785	
—	December 25	BigBang	"Fxxk It" † (Note: "Fxxk It" ranked number one for two weeks in 2017.)	9,500	

== See also ==
- List of M Countdown Chart winners (2016)
- List of Music Bank Chart winners (2016)
