= As If It's Your Last =

Single by Blackpink
- Language: Korean; English
- Released: June 22, 2017
- Studio: The Black Label (Seoul)
- Genre: Dance; synth-pop; house; reggae; moombahton
- Length: 3:33
- Label: YG
- Composers: Teddy; Future Bounce; Lydia Paek
- Lyricists: Teddy; Brother Su; Choice37
- Producers: Future Bounce; Teddy

Blackpink singles chronology
"Playing with Fire" / "Stay" (2016)	"As If It's Your Last" (2017)	"Ddu-Du Ddu-Du" (2018)

Music video
- "As If It's Your Last" on YouTube "As If It's Your Last (JP Ver.)" on YouTube

"As If It's Your Last" (Korean: 마지막처럼; RR: Majimakcheoreom) is a song recorded by South Korean girl group Blackpink. It was released as a standalone single through YG Entertainment on June 22, 2017. The song was written by Teddy Park, Brother Su and Choice37, whilst production was handled by Future Bounce, Teddy Park and Lydia Paek. Musically, "As If It's Your Last" is a synth-pop, house, reggae and moombahton song with its lyrics revolving around finding and losing love.

Commercially, the song debuted atop the Billboard World Digital Songs chart, in addition to number two on the K-pop Hot 100 and number three on the Gaon Digital Chart. The single garnered over 2,500,000 digital downloads and 100 million streams in South Korea as of 2018. In Japan, the song was certified platinum in streaming by the Recording Industry Association of Japan (RIAJ) for its Korean version and gold for its Japanese version. Blackpink promoted the single with live performances on the music programs Inkigayo and Show! Music Core in the weeks following its release.

== Background and release ==
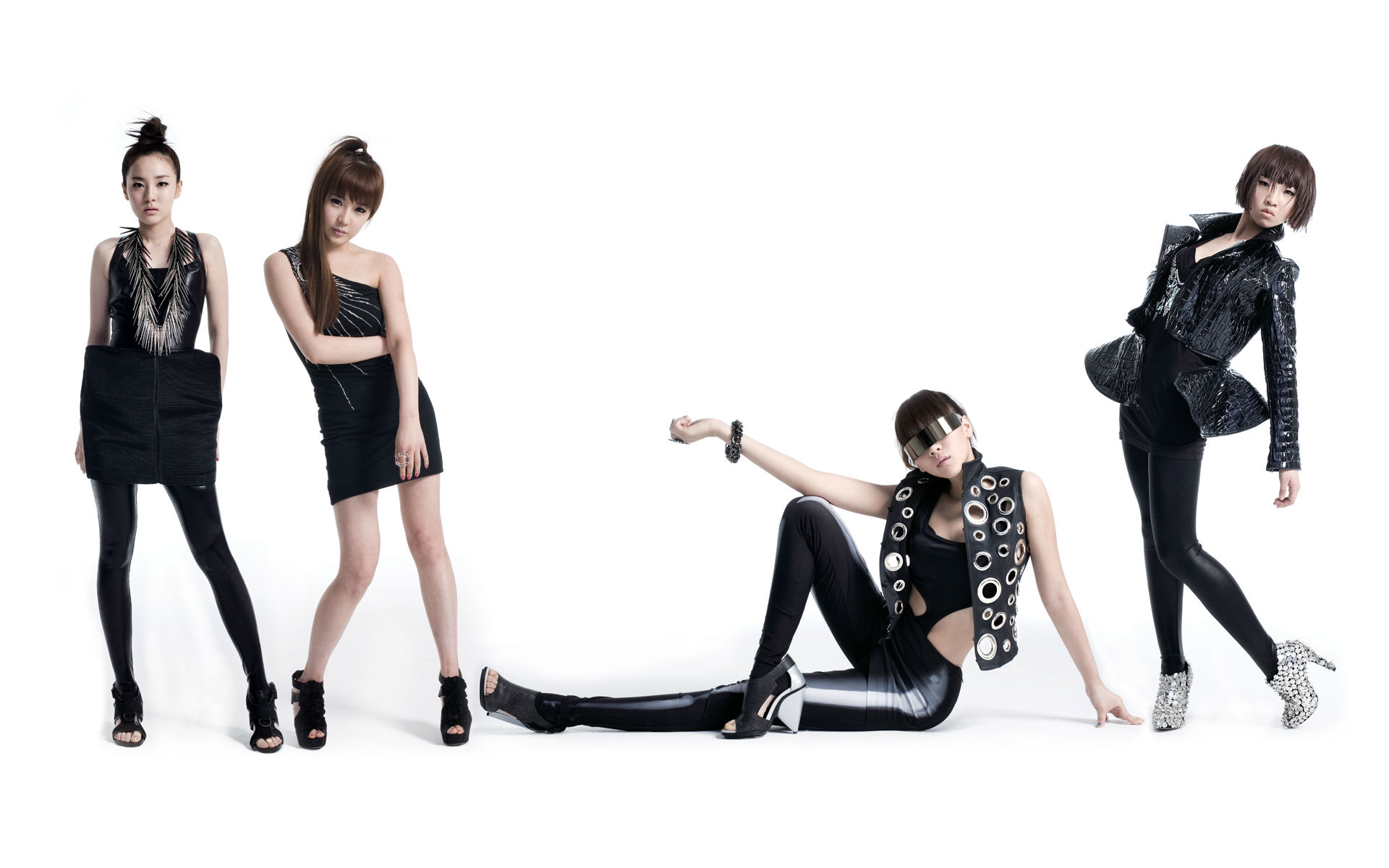
The song, originally titled "Blame It on Your Love", was first given to 2NE1.

The demo for the song was originally given to 2NE1 with the title "Blame It on Your Love", where it was proposed as a single for their second studio album, Crush, in 2014. However, the group ultimately rejected the demo in favor of other tracks.

In mid-May 2017, YG Entertainment officials had confirmed that Blackpink were working toward a June comeback, and on June 5 it was revealed that Blackpink would be filming the music video for the new single during that week. On the same day, YG Entertainment's CEO Yang Hyun-suk released a photo of Blackpink on the filming location of the new music video, confirming that Blackpink would make a June comeback, which is 7 months after the group's last release Square Two (containing the songs "Playing with Fire" and "Stay") in November 2016. The next day on June 6 it was announced that Blackpink would likely release the new song between June 15 and June 20.

On June 13, 2017, YG Entertainment revealed a teaser of the new single and confirmed the release date to be June 22. Subsequently, from June 16 to June 18 each of Blackpink's members' individual teaser was released. On June 19, the title of the single was revealed to be "As If It's Your Last" (마지막처럼), and the time of the new release was confirmed to be 6 pm KST on June 22. It was further explained that this song would be a surprise for fans while Blackpink prepares for Square Three (which later became Square Up), the next release in the Square series after Square One and Square Two.

== Composition ==
"As If It's Your Last" is described as Blackpink's most exciting and upbeat song that they have released so far. Blackpink member Jisoo said that the group had thus far in their history only had "Black" concepts up until then, and that this new single would be a "Pink" concept. The song is a mix of dance, "shimmery" synth-pop, house, reggae and moombahton music with disco grooves, a change of sound from their previous releases.

== Critical reception ==
Professional ratings
Review scores
Source	Rating
IZM	2.5/5 stars

IZM's Jung Min-jae praised the retro-oriented chorus, noting its reminiscent vibe of 80s synth-pop. They stressed, "The team's unique style is still ambiguous, but it's hard to ignore the catchy melody." Reviews from idology were divided. Randy deemed it "disappointing," noting that it didn't live up to the group's previous releases and criticizing the synths for weakening the dark and heavy vibe typical of Blackpink's dance tracks. Shim Eun-bo felt the production sounded outdated, comparing it to music from a decade ago. However, Ham Chand found the song catchy and enjoyable, praising the vocals and rap, noting that it maintained the same vibe as Blackpink's earlier hits like "Whistle" and "Playing with Fire".

=== Year end lists ===
Year-end lists
Publication	List	Rank	Ref.
Billboard	YouTube's top 25 songs of the summer (Global)	Placed	
Billboard	YouTube's 'Best K-Pop Music Video of 2017	1	
YouTube Rewind	Korea Most popular official music video	8	

== Commercial performance ==
In South Korea, the song debuted at number four on the Gaon Digital Chart on the chart issue dated June 24, 2017, with 182,000 paid downloads and 2,997,000 streams. The following week, the song reached its peak at number three, with 157,000 paid downloads and 6,632,000 streams. The song reached number 12 on the monthly chart for June 2017, selling 323,000 copies in eight days. The following month it peaked at number five, selling around 300,000 copies. "As If It's Your Last" ranked at number 18 on the 2017 Gaon Digital Year-end chart. As of September 2018, it has sold more than 2,500,000 digital downloads in South Korea and has charted on the Gaon Digital Chart for 67 weeks.

In Canada, the song debuted at number 45 on the Billboard Canadian Hot 100 on the week ending June 29, 2017, their highest peak in the country surpassing "Playing with Fire" which debuted at number 92 in 2016. In Japan, the song debuted at number 19 on the Billboard Japan Hot 100, becoming Blackpink's highest-charting effort in the country. The song remained at the same position for another week. "As If It's Your Last" debuted at number one on Billboard's World Digital Song Sales chart after selling 4,000 copies with only one day of tracking. The following week, the song sold more than 5,000 downloads to debut at number 13 on Billboard's Bubbling Under Hot 100 chart which, at the time, gave them the highest-charting Korean song by a group in America and made Blackpink the highest-charting Korean group since Wonder Girls in 2009. As of April 2019, the track had reached 11.7 million streams in the UK.

== Accolades ==
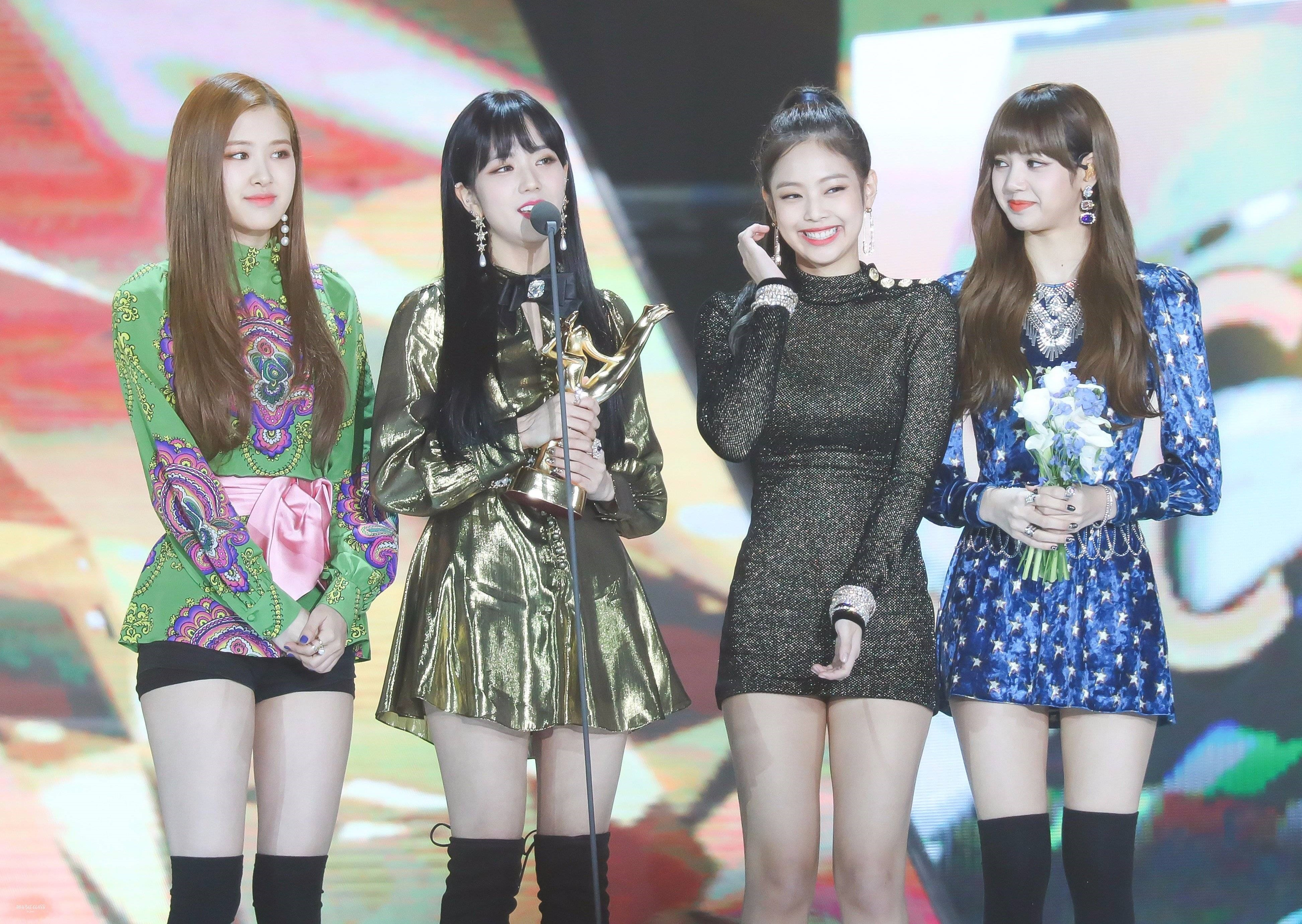
Blackpink at the 32nd Golden Disc Awards, where they won Digital Bonsang for "As If It's Your Last".

On South Korean music programs, "As If It's Your Last" won three first place awards on Inkigayo, achieving a triple crown.

Awards and nominations for "As If It's Your Last"
Organization	Year	Award	Result	Ref.
Melon Music Awards	2017	Best Dance Award – Female	Nominated	
Melon Music Awards	2017	Song of the Year	Nominated	
Golden Disc Awards	2018	Best Digital Song (Bonsang)	Won	
Golden Disc Awards	2018	Song of the Year (Daesang)	Nominated	

Music program awards
Program	Date	Ref.
Inkigayo	July 2, 2017	
Inkigayo	July 9, 2017	
Inkigayo	July 16, 2017	

== Music video and promotion ==
On June 20, a teaser of the music video was released on both Blackpink's official YouTube channel and the group's official V Live channel. The following day, a behind-the-scenes video was released, and YG Entertainment announced that the group would hold a comeback special live on Naver's V App at 8 pm KST on June 22. On June 22 at 6 pm KST, "As If It's Your Last" was released on major music portals in South Korea, and its music video was released on Blackpink's YouTube and V Live channels. Within 17 hours after release, the music video for "As If It's Your Last" gained more than 11 million views on YouTube, becoming the fastest music video to exceed 10 million views by a K-pop group at that time and breaking the record previously held by "Not Today" by BTS, which gained 10 million views within 21 hours. Furthermore, the music video became the second most viewed online video in the first 24 hours by a Korean act, with more than 13.3 million views within 24 hours after release, second only to Psy's "Gentleman". On June 24, the dance practice video for "As If It's Your Last" was released on Blackpink's V Live channel and as of March 18, 2021, it has more than 210 million views. The music video hit one billion views on April 27, 2021, making Blackpink the only K-pop artist with four music videos to break the one billion mark, and 1.5 billion views in February 2026.

Blackpink promoted "As If It's Your Last" on various music shows in South Korea in the month leading up to their Japanese debut in July. Specifically, the group held their comeback stage on MBC's Show! Music Core on June 24, which was the first time that they ever appeared on the show.

== Usage in media ==
The song and its music video were featured in the DCEU film Justice League, where Barry Allen plays it in his apartment in Central City.

The song was also featured as the opening theme for the South Korean TV show 'Blackpink House'.

The song was also featured in the Disney Channel animated series Amphibia, in the penultimate episode titled "All In". The episode aired on May 7, 2022.

== Credits and personnel ==
Credits adapted from Melon.

- Blackpink – vocals
- Teddy – composer, lyricist, arranger
- Future Bounce – composer, arranger
- Choice37 – lyricist
- Brother Su – lyricist
- Lydia Paek – composer

== Chart performance ==
=== Weekly charts ===
Weekly chart performance for "As If It's Your Last"
Chart (2017–2023)	Peak position
Australia Streaming Audio Visual Tracks (ARIA)	30
Canada Hot 100 (Billboard)	45
Finland Digital Song Sales (Billboard)	7
Finland Download (Latauslista)	5
France Download (SNEP)	180
Japan Hot 100 (Billboard)	19
Malaysia (RIM)	4
New Zealand Heatseekers (RMNZ)	3
South Korea (Gaon)	3
South Korea (K-pop Hot 100)	2
Taiwan (Billboard)	23
UK Indie (Official Charts)	45
US Bubbling Under Hot 100 (Billboard)	13
US World Digital Song Sales (Billboard)	1
Vietnam Hot 100 (Billboard)	70

=== Monthly charts ===
Monthly chart performance for "As If It's Your Last"
Chart (2017)	Peak position
South Korea (Gaon)	5

=== Year-end charts ===
2017 year-end chart performance for "As If It's Your Last"
Chart (2017)	Position
South Korea (Gaon)	18

2018 year-end chart performance for "As If It's Your Last"
Chart (2018)	Position
South Korea (Gaon)	64
US World Digital Songs (Billboard)	13

2024 year-end chart performance for "As If It's Your Last"
Chart (2024)	Position
South Korea (Circle)	193

2025 year-end chart performance for "As If It's Your Last"
Chart (2025)	Position
South Korea (Circle)	187

== Certifications and sales ==
Certifications and sales for "As If It's Your Last"
Region	Certification	Certified units/sales
New Zealand (RMNZ)	Gold	15,000^{‡}
South Korea	—	2,500,000
United Kingdom (BPI)	Silver	200,000^{‡}
Streaming
Japan (RIAJ)	Platinum	100,000,000^{†}
Japan (RIAJ) Japanese version	Platinum	100,000,000^{†}
South Korea	—	100,000,000
^{‡} Sales+streaming figures based on certification alone.^{†} Streaming-only figures based on certification alone.

== Release history ==
Release dates and formats for "As If It's Your Last"
Region	Date	Format	Label	Ref.
Various	June 22, 2017	Digital download; streaming	YG Entertainment	

== See also ==
- List of Inkigayo Chart winners (2017)
- List of K-pop songs on the Billboard charts
