= Teddy Park =

American rapper and music producer

- Born: Park Hong-jun; September 14, 1978 (age 48); Seoul, South Korea
- Education: Diamond Bar High School
- Occupations: Rapper; songwriter; record producer
- Years active: 1998–present
- Musical career
- Genre: Korean hip hop
- Instruments: Vocals; keyboards
- Labels: YG; The Black Label
- Formerly of: 1TYM; YG Family

Korean name
- Hangul: 박홍준
- RR: Bak Hongjun
- MR: Pak Hongjun

Teddy Park (born Park Hong-jun; September 14, 1978) is a Korean-American rapper, songwriter, and record producer based in South Korea. He first gained attention as a member of the hip hop group 1TYM and gained prominence as a producer for YG Entertainment and his own entertainment company The Black Label. Park has received several accolades including an Academy Award, a Grammy Award, and a Golden Globe Award. Forbes magazine describes him as the "K-pop/rap star turned prolific music producer who has helped shape and aid South Korean music's global crossover".

Born in Seoul, South Korea, Park moved to the United States with his family as a young child. When he was 17 years old, Park and his friend Taebin flew to South Korea during summer vacation to audition for YG Entertainment. Both were signed immediately, and after finishing high school in the US, moved to Korea to pursue music. In 1998, Park debuted in the hip hop group 1TYM with his friend Danny, Jinhwan, and Baekyoung. Together, the group recorded five studio albums with Park as their primary songwriter and producer.

After 1TYM went to indefinite hiatus in January 2006, Park became an in-house producer for YG Entertainment and co-founded The Black Label in 2016. He has co-produced and co-written songs for YG artists such as Jinusean, Seven, Big Bang, 2NE1, Lee Hi, Blackpink, and Jeon Somi, as well as Uhm Jung-hwa and Sunmi. As a producer, he has achieved critical and commercial success for several K-pop acts. For producing the soundtrack of the Netflix animated musical film KPop Demon Hunters (2025) including the single "Golden", he won an Academy Award for Best Original Song, a Grammy Award for Best Song Written for Visual Media, and a Golden Globe Award for Best Original Song.

== Early life ==
Park was born in Seoul, South Korea, but moved to New York City as a young child. He learned the piano as a child, but as he grew up, he was more interested in playing the guitar and beatboxing. After his father was transferred to Diamond Bar, California, Park attended Diamond Bar High School and became friends with future bandmate Danny Im. Growing up, the two sang together at karaoke bars and tinkered with recording equipment. They were discovered when they were teenagers by a producer who worked with Yang Hyun-suk, founder of YG Entertainment. After auditioning for Yang and sending in demo tapes, the two were signed to his newly established label, and moved to South Korea. Although Park enrolled in a university when he returned to South Korea, he dropped out to focus on his career.

== Career ==
=== 1998–2006: Beginnings with 1TYM ===
Park and Danny Im were joined by rappers Jinhwan and Baekyoung and debuted as 1TYM in 1998 with the album, One Time for Your Mind. It became one of the best-selling albums of the year and won several major awards. After the first album, Park began to have more input into the songs, and had a more prominent role in producing. In 2000, 1TYM released their second album 2nd Round. The songs "One Love" and "쾌지나 칭칭" (Let's Sing and Dance Together), which he wrote and produced, won first place on TV music programs. This was followed by Third Time Fo' Yo' Mind in 2001. In 2003, 1TYM released their fourth album Once N 4 All, which yielded two singles: "Hot 뜨거", an up-beat hip-hop track with reggae rhythms, and "Without You", an emotional R&B ballad. The group went on a two-year hiatus in which member Im embarked on a brief solo career under the name of Taebin. The group reunited for the album One Way in 2005, their fifth and last studio album, before going on hiatus due to Jinhwan's mandatory military service. Their albums have sold a combined total of 780,000 copies.

Though they were predominately hip hop artists, 1TYM was influenced by reggae and R&B. 1TYM along with the duo Jinusean were credited for bringing hip hop music and YG Entertainment to the mainstream. At 22 years old, Park also began producing for other artists on the label, most of whom were much older and more experienced than him.

=== 2006–2015: Mainstream success as producer for YG Entertainment ===
With 1TYM on indefinite hiatus, Park transitioned into the role of producer for other YG artists, his first major contribution being "La La La" for Seven's album Sevolution. He also collaborated with Big Bang for several of their songs, most notably "Sunset Glow." When BigBang member Taeyang embarked on a solo career in 2008, Park produced his extended play, Hot. The following year, Park produced "Lollipop" for a collaboration between BigBang and 2NE1. The song went on to top the Gaon Chart during April.

Park would go on to have a hand in producing a majority of 2NE1's work, including their debut extended play, 2NE1 (2009) and studio album, To Anyone (2010). Two of the three main singles, "Can't Nobody" and "Go Away," from the latter were also composed by Park. To continue producing for 2NE1, Park rejected an offer to work with Lady Gaga. He collaborated with Seven again to produce the promotional single "Better Together," in addition to other songs for the EP Digital Bounce (2010) and was featured in G-Dragon's song "The Leaders." He also had a role in Taeyang's solo album Solar, including the singles "Where U At" and "Wedding Dress." At the end of the year, Park also participated in the production of GD & TOP's album, and co-composed both "High High" and "Oh Yeah".

In 2011, he wrote and produced 2NE1's second EP 2NE1, scoring three number-one hits: "Lonely", "I Am the Best", and "Ugly". In the first half of 2013, Park produced Lee Hi hit single "Rose," 2NE1's leader CL's solo debut single "The Baddest Female," and Kang Seung-yoon's YG debut "Wild & Young." The following year, he wrote and produced 2NE1's second and final studio album, Crush. In 2015, he wrote and produced Big Bang's special project single albums M, A, D, and E which became major hits. He is credited in shaping the YG Entertainment sound.

=== 2016–2023: The Black Label and continued focus on producing ===
In 2016, Park became publicly associated with Blackpink and produced their first two single albums Square One and Square Two, consisting of number-one hit "Whistle" and top-ten hits "Boombayah", "Playing with Fire", and "Stay". That same year, he founded The Black Label, a subsidiary of YG Entertainment. The label initial included Zion.T, Korea's second bestselling artist of 2015 after BigBang. He also signed Korean-Canadian singer and former I.O.I member Jeon Somi and K-pop girl group Meovv.

In 2017, Park wrote and produced the hit single, originally intended for 2NE1, "As If It's Your Last", for Blackpink. In 2018, he wrote and produced their debut EP, Square Up, including the number-one single "Ddu-Du Ddu-Du" as well as "Forever Young". Park also wrote and produced Blackpink member Jennie's number-one hit song "Solo". Park produced for the first time for a non-YG Entertainment artist with "Just Dance," the theme song for the reality television competition Mix Nine. Participants singing and dancing to the song was released and three versions of the song were released overall: a male version led by Hyojin of ONF, a female version led by Lee Sujin from Fave Entertainment, and a co-ed version performed by both teams. He produced two songs for singer Sunmi: "Gashina" and "Heroine".

In 2018, there were concerns that Sunmi's "Heroine" has plagiarized Cheryl's debut solo single "Fight for This Love". Sunmi's agency said that they were investigating the issue. It later concluded with stating, "We unequivocally reveal that 'Heroine' is 100 percent an original creative work with absolutely no reference to the song that has been named in the controversy." In 2019, Park wrote and produced Blackpink's second EP, Kill This Love. He also wrote and produced singer Jeon Somi's debut single "Birthday".

In 2020, Park played a major role in writing and producing Blackpink's debut studio album, The Album, which consisted of the number-one song "How You Like That" as well as hit singles "Ice Cream" and "Lovesick Girls". In 2021, Park wrote and produced Blackpink members Rosé and Lisa's respective debut solo singles "On the Ground" and "Lalisa". He also wrote and produced many of the songs on Jeon Somi's debut studio album XOXO, which included top-ten single "Dumb Dumb".

=== 2024–present: Further critical and commercial success ===
Park produced majority of the soundtrack of the Netflix animated musical KPop Demon Hunters (2025), which was a major worldwide commercial and critical success, with one of the singles, "Golden", topping the Billboard Global 200 and reaching the top of the charts in many countries, including the United States. His work on KPop Demon Hunters earned Park numerous accolades, including a Grammy Award for Best Song Written for Visual Media, a Golden Globe Award for Best Original Song, and an Academy Award for Best Original Song. "Golden" is the first K-pop song to win a Grammy.

He assisted in writing Blackpink's comeback single "Jump" in 2025, from the group's third Korean extended play Deadline.

== Artistry ==
Park's production style often incorporates contemporary R&B, especially when working with Taeyang and Seven. He also features reggae in his songs, acknowledging the genre's influence on 2NE1's debut EP. His work with 2NE1's first full-length album and 2011 EP contained songs that are pop and dance, in addition to featuring house elements. The song "Lonely" by 2NE1 was praised for its acoustic sound. Park also experimented with electronic music when working with BigBang.

At the end of 2009, 10Asia named Park as one of the top 10 people of 2009 for his participation in some of the year's biggest k-pop hits. In 2018, Seoul Sports published a list of "Most Influential Power People of K-pop," which was ranked by music industry executives. Park placed fifth in the category of best producer. That same year, he and G-Dragon tied for the most earned royalties for lyrics writing and song composition within the field of popular music from the Korean Music Copyright Association. Park gets paid about US$850,000 a year from the Korean Music Copyright Association.

== Public image ==
After becoming an in-house producer for YG Entertainment in the mid 2000s, Park has shied away from public life; he has refused to appear on air and is known to skip award ceremonies.

In 2026, Park won a Grammy Award – the first for any K-pop act – for producing the single "Golden" and did not attend the event. Forbes magazine described him as the "K-pop/rap star turned prolific music producer who has helped shape and aid South Korean music's global crossover for over two decades". His fellow producer Jeong Hoon-seo (stage name 24), in his acceptance speech, gave a special shoutout to Park calling him "Pioneer of K-Pop".

== Personal life ==
In 2014, he purchased a building in Hongdae, Seoul worth US$9 million and opened his own cafe called Twosome Studio in that building. In 2016, he purchased a US$6 million house in Hannam-dong, Seoul from Hyundai Group founder's nephew.

== Discography ==
=== As featured artist ===
Title	Year	Album
"널 버리지마" (Yang Hyun Suk feat. 1TYM and Perry)	1998	Yang Hyun Suk
"Hip-Hop Seoul-Ja" (Jinusean feat. Chino XL, Masta Wu, Teddy)	2001	The Reign
"Bounce" (Perry feat. Masta Wu, Teddy)	2001	Perry By Storm
"With Me" (Wheesung feat. Teddy)	2003	It's Real
"Let Me Dance" (Lexy feat. Teddy)	2003	Lexury
"빠져 나와" (Lexy feat. Teddy, Danny)	2003	Lexury
"Corea New School" (Wheesung feat. Teddy)	2004	For The Moment
"Micro Phone" (Jinusean feat. Teddy, Danny)	2004	Let's Play (노.라.보.세.)
"서로가 서로를" (Taebin feat. 1TYM)	2004	Taebin Of 1TYM
"Tabu" (Taebin feat. Teddy)	2004	Taebin Of 1TYM
"Anyclub" (Lee Hyori feat. Teddy)	2006	CM Single for Samsung Anycall
"I Know" (Seven feat. Teddy)	2006	24/7
"Oh-No!" (Seven feat. Teddy)	2006	24/7
"No More Trouble" (Stony Skunk feat. Teddy)	2006	Skunk Riddim
"Do Or Die" (Masta Wu feat. Teddy)	2007	Mass Wu Pt.2
"껌" (Masta Wu feat. Teddy)	2007	Mass Wu Pt.2
"The Leaders" (G-Dragon feat. CL and Teddy)	2009	Heartbreaker
"Move" (Taeyang feat. Teddy)	2010	Solar
"Prayer" (Taeyang feat. Teddy)	2010	Solar

== Accolades ==
=== Awards and nominations ===
Name of the award ceremony, year presented, award category, nominee of the award and the result of the nomination
Award ceremony	Year	Category	Nominee/work	Result	Ref.
Academy Awards	2026	Best Original Song	"Golden" (Note: with Ejae, Mark Sonnenblick, 24, IDO)	Won	
Advanced Imaging Society Lumiere Awards	2026	Best Original Song	"Golden"	Won	
American Cinematheque	2026	Tribute to the Crafts Feature Film Song	"Golden"	Honored	
Annie Awards	2025	Outstanding Achievement for Music in a Feature Production	KPop Demon Hunters (Note: with KPop Demon Hunters Music Team.)	Won	
Asian Pop Music Awards	2020	Best Composer (Overseas)	"How You Like That"	Nominated	
Asian Pop Music Awards	2021	Best Composer (Overseas)	"Dumb Dumb" (Note: with 24, R.Tee, Dominsuk)	Nominated	
Asian Pop Music Awards	2021	Best Composer (Overseas)	"Lalisa" (Note: with 24, R.Tee, Bekuh Boom, Vince)	Nominated	
Asian Pop Music Awards	2021	Best Composer (Overseas)	"XOXO" (Note: with Pink Sweats, 24, Jeon Somi, Kush, Pacific, Danny Chung, Vince)	Nominated	
Asian Pop Music Awards	2022	Best Composer (Overseas)	"Pink Venom" (Note: with 24, R.Tee, IDO)	Nominated	
Asian Pop Music Awards	2022	Best Producer (Overseas)	Born Pink (Note: with 24, R.Tee, Freddy Wexler, Nohc, Paro)	Won	
Astra Film Awards	2026	Best Original Song	"Golden"	Won	
Critics Association of Central Florida	2026	Best Original Song	"Golden"	Won	
Chicago Indie Critics	2026	Best Original Song	"Golden"	Nominated	
Critics' Choice Movie Awards	2026	Best Song	"Golden"	Won	
Denver Film Critics Society	2026	Best Song	"Golden"	Won	
DiscussingFilm's Global Film Critics Awards	2026	Best Original Song	"Golden"	Won	
Dorian Award	2026	Film Music of the Year	KPop Demon Hunters	Nominated	
Gaon Chart Music Awards	2012	Composer of the Year	Teddy Park	Won	
Gaon Chart Music Awards	2019	Composer of the Year	Teddy Park	Won	
Georgia Film Critics Association	2025	Best Original Song	"Golden"	Runner-up	
Gold Derby Film Awards	2026	Best Original Song	"Golden"	Won	
Golden Globe Awards	2026	Best Original Song	"Golden"	Won	
Grammy Awards	2026	Song of the Year	"Golden"	Nominated	
Grammy Awards	2026	Best Song Written for Visual Media	"Golden"	Won	
Hollywood Music in Media Awards	2025	Original Song – Animated Film	"Golden"	Won	
Houston Film Critics Society	2025	Best Original Song	"Golden"	Won	
Korea Grand Music Awards	2025	Best Producer	Teddy Park	Won	
Korea Image Awards	2026	Stepping Stone Award	Teddy Park (Note: with The Black Label CEO Jung Kyung-in)	Won	
Las Vegas Film Critics Society	2025	Best Song	"Golden"	Nominated	
Latino Entertainment Journalists Association	2026	Best Song	"Golden"	Won	
MAMA Awards	2009	Composer Award	"Fire" and "I Don't Care"	Won	
MAMA Awards	2021	Best Producer of the Year	Lalisa	Won	
MAMA Awards	2025	Song of the Year	"Golden"	Nominated	
Melon Music Awards	2015	Songwriter Award	Made	Won	
New Jersey Film Critics Circle	2025	Best Original Song	"Golden"	Won	
New Mexico Film Critics Association Awards	2025	Best Original Song	"Golden"	Runner-up	
North Carolina Film Critics Association	2026	Best Original Song	"Golden"	Won	
North Carolina Film Critics Association	2026	Best Original Song	"What It Sounds Like" (Note: with Ejae, Daniel Rojas, Mark Sonnenblick, 24, IDO)	Nominated	
The Online Film & Television Association	2026	Best Original Song	"Golden"	Runner-up	
Pittsburgh Film Critics Association	2026	Best Song	"Golden"	Runner-up	
Puerto Rico Critics Association	2026	Best Original Song	"Golden"	Won	
Satellite Awards	2026	Best Original Song	"Golden"	Nominated	
Songwriters of North America	2026	Global Impact Award	KPop Demon Hunters (Note: with KPop Demon Hunters Songwriting team)	Honored	
World Soundtrack Awards	2026	Best Original Song	"Golden"	Won	

=== State and cultural honors ===
Name of country or organization, award ceremony, year given, and name of honor
Country or organization	Award ceremony	Year	Honor	Ref.
South Korea	Korea Content Awards	2025	Prime Minister's Commendation	

=== Listicles ===
Name of publisher, year listed, name of listicle, and placement
Publisher	Year	Listicle	Placement	Ref.
Gold House	2022	A100 List	Included	
Gold House	2026	Gold100 List (Note: with Ejae, Rei Ami, Audrey Nuna, IDO & 24)	Included	
Golden Disc Awards	2025	Golden Disc Powerhouse 40	Included	
