= Square Two =

Single album by Blackpink
- Released: November 1, 2016
- Genre: Tropical house; folk-pop
- Length: 10:39
- Language: Korean; English
- Label: YG; KT
- Producer: Teddy; R. Tee; Seo Wonjin

Blackpink chronology
Square One (2016)	Square Two (2016)	Blackpink (2017)

Singles from Square Two
- 1. "Playing with Fire" / "Stay" Released: November 1, 2016

Square Two is the second single album by South Korean girl group Blackpink. It was released digitally on November 1, 2016, by YG Entertainment and was distributed through KT Music. The single album consists of the songs "Playing with Fire" and "Stay", as well as an acoustic version of "Whistle". Lyrics on the single album were written by Teddy and the production was also handled by Teddy, R. Tee and Seo Won-jin.

== Promotion ==
On October 19, 2016, it was revealed that Blackpink would be the next YG Entertainment artist to make a comeback. On October 24, the teaser images of members Lisa and Jennie were revealed, with the name of one of the main titles, "Playing With Fire", followed by the teaser images of Rosé and Jisoo the following day. The teaser photos of the entire group were revealed on October 27 for the second main track "Stay". On October 30, YG Entertainment posted a backstage video for "Stay" and the next day for "Playing With Fire".

The group performed their two new titles live for the first time at SBS' Inkigayo on November 6.

== Music videos ==
The music videos of "Playing with Fire" was directed by Seo Hyun-seung and "Stay" was directed by Han Sa-min, who had previously directed the music videos of "Gotta Be You" by 2NE1 and "Sober" by Big Bang. They were posted on Blackpink's official YouTube channel on November 1, 2016.

Blackpink also posted the music video clip for the choreography of "Playing With Fire" on its official YouTube channel on November 4, 2016. The choreography was created by Kyle Hanagami, who had already worked with the group for the song "Boombayah" from their previous single album Square One.

== Commercial performance ==
In the United States, Square Two debuted on the Billboard Top Heatseekers chart at number 13 and on the Billboard World Albums chart with 1,000 copies sold in its first week of release. The following week, the album rose to a peak of number 2 on the World Albums chart for the chart issue dated November 26, 2016. The album stayed on the World Albums chart for a total of 22 non-consecutive weeks. As of August 2017, Square Two moved 7,000 copies and the five singles included on the digital EP sold a total of 113,000 digital song downloads in the U.S.

== Track listing ==
Square Two track listing
No.	Title	Lyrics	Music	Arrangement	Length
1.	"Playing with Fire" (불장난; Buljangnan)	Teddy	Teddy; R. Tee	R. Tee	3:17
2.	"Stay"	Teddy	Teddy; Seo Won-jin	Teddy; Seo	3:50
3.	"Whistle" (휘파람; acoustic version)	Teddy; Bekuh Boom; B.I	Teddy; Future Bounce; Boom	Seo	3:52
Total length:					10:39

iTunes bonus track
No.	Title	Lyrics	Music	Arrangement	Length
4.	"Whistle"	Teddy; Boom; B.I	Teddy; Future Bounce; Boom	Teddy; Future Bounce	3:32
5.	"Boombayah"	Teddy; Boom	Teddy; Boom	Teddy	4:00
Total length:					18:11

== Charts ==
Chart performance for Square Two
Chart (2016)	Peak position
US Heatseekers Albums (Billboard)	13
US World Albums (Billboard)	2
