= MTV Video Music Award for Show of the Summer =

Music video award

- Awarded for: Concert tours
- Country: United States
- Presented by: MTV
- First award: 2023
- Currently held by: Taylor Swift
- Website: VMA website

The MTV Video Music Award for Show of the Summer award was first introduced at the MTV Video Music Awards in 2023.

== Recipients ==
=== 2020s ===
Recipients
Year (Note: Each year is linked to the article about the MTV Video Music Awards held that year.)	Winner(s)	Nominees	Ref.
2023	Taylor Swift	Beyoncé; Blackpink; Drake; Ed Sheeran; Karol G	
