= List of M Countdown Chart winners (2016) =

Winners of South Korean music program M Countdown

M Countdown Chart winners (2016)

The M Countdown Chart is a record chart on the South Korean Mnet television music program M Countdown. Every week, the show awards the best-performing single on the chart in the country during its live broadcast.

In 2016, 36 singles achieved a number one on the show and 27 music acts were awarded first-place trophies. Six songs collected trophies for three weeks and achieved a triple crown: "Daddy" by Psy, "Dumb & Dumber" by iKon, "Rough" and "Navillera" by GFriend, "Cheer Up" by Twice, and "Monster" by Exo. No release for the year earned a perfect score, but "Monster" acquired the highest point total on the June 23 broadcast with 10,849 points.

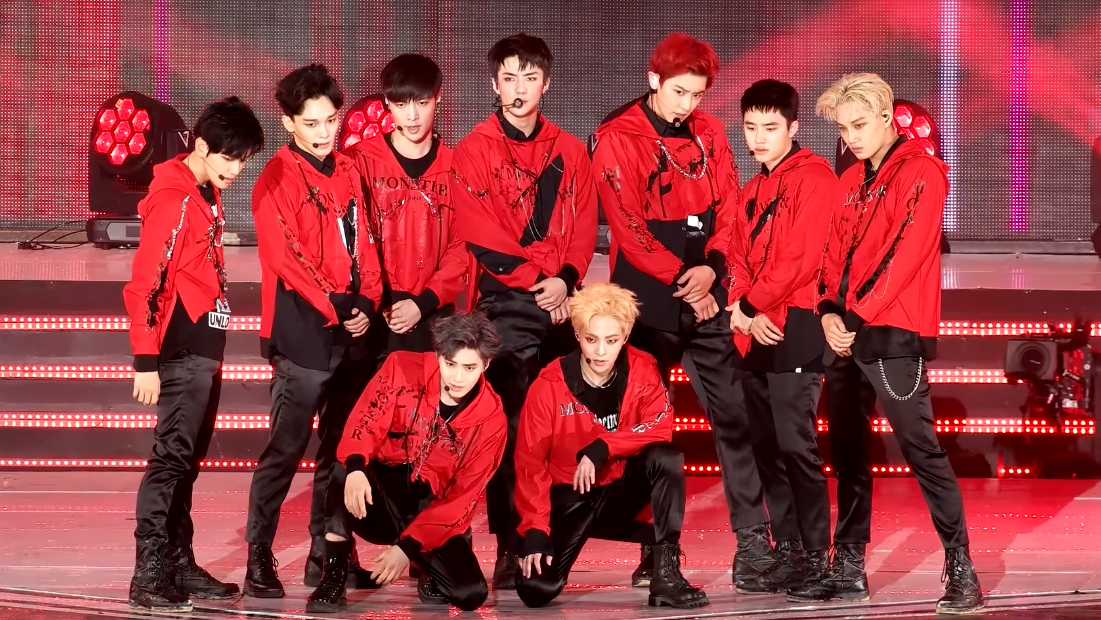
"Monster" by Exo (above) was the highest-scoring song of 2016 on M Countdown. It won first place on episode 480 with 10,988 points, and subsequently achieved a triple crown.

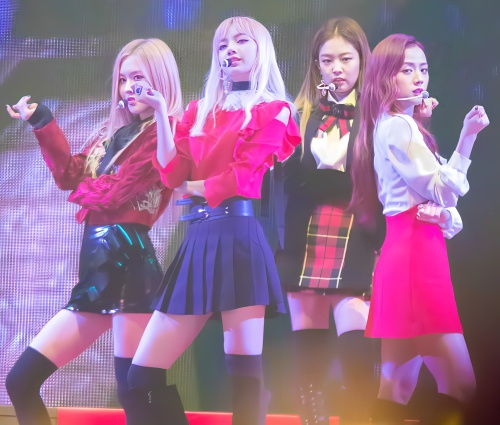
Blackpink (above) won their first M Countdown trophy with their debut single "Whistle".

== Scoring system ==
Songs were judged based on a combination of digital music sales (50%), album sales (15%), social media performance (official YouTube music video views and SNS buzz: 15%), popularity (global fan votes and age range preference: 10%), Mnet's broadcast score (10%), and a live SMS vote (10%) that took place during the show, for a total of 11,000 points.

== Chart history ==
Key
| | Triple Crown |
| | Highest score in 2016 |
| — | No show was held |

| Episode | Date | Artist | Song | Points | Ref. |
|---|---|---|---|---|---|
| 455 | January 7 | Psy | "Daddy" | 8,433 | |
| 456 | January 14 | iKon | "Dumb & Dumber" | 10,175 | |
| 457 | January 21 | iKon | "Dumb & Dumber" | 9,499 | |
| 458 | January 28 | iKon | "Dumb & Dumber" | 8,930 | |
| 459 | February 4 | GFriend | "Rough" | 9,424 | |
| 460 | February 11 | GFriend | "Rough" | —N/a | |
| 461 | February 18 | GFriend | "Rough" | 8,959 | |
| 462 | February 25 | Winner | "Sentimental" | 9,895 | |
| 463 | March 3 | Taemin | "Press Your Number" | 7,771 | |
| 464 | March 10 | Mamamoo | "You're the Best" | 9,528 | |
| 465 | March 17 | Lee Hi | "Breathe" | 8,210 | |
| 466 | March 24 | Red Velvet | "One of These Nights" | 7,922 | |
| 467 | March 31 | Got7 | "Fly" | 7,032 | |
| 468 | April 7 | BtoB | "Remember That" | 7,140 | |
| 469 | April 14 | CNBLUE | "You're So Fine" | —N/a | |
| 470 | April 21 | Block B | "Toy" | 9,092 | |
| 471 | April 28 | Jung Eun-ji | "Hopefully Sky" | 8,614 | |
| 472 | May 5 | Twice | "Cheer Up" | 10,264 | |
| 473 | May 12 | BTS | "Fire" | 7,692 | |
| 474 | May 19 | Twice | "Cheer Up" | 9,205 | |
| 475 | May 26 | Twice | "Cheer Up" | 9,095 | |
| 476 | June 2 | Baek A-yeon | "So-So" | —N/a | |
| 477 | June 9 | Baek A-yeon | "So-So" | 7,084 | |
| 478 | June 14 | KCON France Special Episode, winners were not announced | | | |
| 479 | June 16 | Exo | "Monster" | 9,877 | |
| 480 | June 23 | Exo | "Monster" | 10,849 | |
| 481 | June 30 | Exo | "Monster" | —N/a | |
| 482 | July 7 | Sistar | "I Like That" | 9,519 | |
| 483 | July 14 | Wonder Girls | "Why So Lonely" | 8,250 | |
| 484 | July 21 | GFriend | "Navillera" | 9,154 | |
| 485 | July 28 | GFriend | "Navillera" | 9,406 | |
| 486 | August 4 | GFriend | "Navillera" | —N/a | |
| 487 | August 9 | KCON LA Special Episode, winners were not announced | | | |
| 488 | August 11 | Hyuna | "How's This?" | 8,403 | |
| 489 | August 18 | I.O.I | "Whatta Man" | 8,158 | |
| 490 | August 25 | Exo | "Lotto" | 8,310 | |
| 491 | September 1 | Exo | "Lotto" | 8,150 | |
| 492 | September 8 | Blackpink | "Whistle" | 7,330 | |
| — | September 15 | Red Velvet | "Russian Roulette" | —N/a | |
| 493 | September 22 | Red Velvet | "Russian Roulette" | 9,576 | |
| 494 | September 29 | Infinite | "The Eye" | 7,714 | |
| 495 | October 6 | Got7 | "Hard Carry" | 7,994 | |
| 496 | October 13 | Shinee | "1 of 1" | 10,023 | |
| 497 | October 20 | BTS | "Blood Sweat & Tears" | 9,852 | |
| 498 | October 27 | I.O.I | "Very Very Very" | —N/a | |
| 499 | November 3 | Twice | "TT" | 10,511 | |
| 500 | November 10 | Twice | "TT" | 8,362 | |
| 501 | November 17 | MAMA Special Broadcast, winners were not announced | | | |
| 502 | November 24 | MAMA Special Broadcast, winners were not announced | | | |
| — | December 1 | MAMA Special Broadcast, winners were not announced | | | |
| — | December 8 | MAMA Special Broadcast, winners were not announced | | | |
| 503 | December 15 | Seventeen | "Boom Boom" | 6,834 | |
| 504 | December 22 | Big Bang | "Fxxk It" | 8,535 | |
| — | December 29 | No. 1 Special Broadcast, winners were not announced | | | |
