= Square One (single album) =

Single album by Blackpink
- Released: August 8, 2016
- Studio: YG Entertainment
- Genre: K-pop
- Length: 7:33
- Language: Korean; English
- Label: YG
- Producer: Teddy; Bekuh Boom; Future Bounce

Blackpink chronology
Square One (2016)	Square Two (2016)

Singles from Square One
- 1. "Whistle" / "Boombayah" Released: August 8, 2016

Square One is the debut single album by South Korean girl group Blackpink. It was released digitally on August 8, 2016, by YG Entertainment. Lyrics on the single album were written by B.I, Teddy, and Bekuh Boom while production was handled by Teddy, Future Bounce, and Bekuh Boom.

== Promotion ==
To promote Square One, Blackpink made their first live performances of "Whistle" and "Boombayah" at the SBS Inkigayo on August 14, 2016. On August 21, the group won its first award during a musical program for "Whistle" at Inkigayo.

== Commercial performance ==
Square One reached number one on iTunes's album chart within two days of release, setting a record for a rookie Korean girl group. Both singles from Square One debuted in the top ten of the Gaon Digital Chart in South Korea. "Whistle" debuted at number one and "Boombayah" at number seven on the chart. The two singles as well as the tracks on Blackpink's second single album Square Two combined sold a total of 113,000 digital song downloads in the U.S. by August 2017.

== Track listing ==
Square One track listing
No.	Title	Lyrics	Music	Arrangement	Length
1.	"Whistle" (휘파람; Hwi-param)	Teddy; Bekuh Boom; B.I	Teddy; Future Bounce; Boom	Teddy; Future Bounce	3:31
2.	"Boombayah" (붐바야; Bumbaya)	Teddy; Boom	Teddy; Boom	Teddy	4:00
Total length:					7:33

== Charts ==
Weekly charts

=== "Whistle" ===
Chart (2016)	Peak position
Finland Download (Latauslista)	24
South Korea (Gaon)	1
US World Digital Songs (Billboard)	2

=== "Boombayah" ===
Chart (2016–2017)	Peak position
Finland Download (Latauslista)	21
France (SNEP)	196
Japan Hot 100 (Billboard)	15
South Korea (Gaon)	7
US World Digital Songs (Billboard)	1

== Accolades ==
Awards and nominations for Square One
Year	Organization	Award	Work	Result	Ref.
2016	Mnet Asian Music Awards	Best Music Video	"Whistle"	Won	
2016	Golden Disc Award	Best Digital Song (Bonsang)	"Whistle"	Nominated	
2017	Gaon Chart Music Awards	Song of the Year – August	"Whistle"	Won	
