= Whistle (Blackpink song) =

- Promotional graphic

Single by Blackpink

from the album Square One
- Language: Korean; English
- Released: August 8, 2016
- Genre: Hip hop
- Length: 3:32
- Label: YG
- Songwriters: Teddy; Bekuh Boom; Future Bounce; B.I
- Producers: Teddy; Bekuh Boom; Future Bounce

Blackpink singles chronology
| "Whistle" / "Boombayah" (2016) | "Playing with Fire" / "Stay" (2016) |

Music video
- "Whistle" on YouTube "Whistle (JP Ver.)" on YouTube

"Whistle" (Korean: 휘파람; RR: Hwiparam) is a song recorded by South Korean girl group Blackpink for their debut single album, Square One (2016). The song was released through YG Entertainment on August 8, 2016, simultaneously with Square One's other single "Boombayah". An acoustic version of the song was also included on the group's second single album, Square Two (2016). The song was written and produced by YG Entertainment collaborators Teddy, Bekuh Boom, and Future Bounce, with additional lyrics penned by labelmate B.I of iKon. Musically, it consists of a minimal drum and bass beat and integrates a variety of instrumentations, including a heartbeat and whistles—alluding to the title.

"Whistle" received positive reviews from music critics, who praised the song's musical styles and composition. It was named among the best K-pop releases of the year and the decade by Billboard magazine. A commercial success, the song held the number-one position on the Gaon Digital Chart in South Korea for two weeks, marking Blackpink's first number-one single of their career. It additionally reached number two on the US Billboard World Digital Songs chart. Directed by Beomjin J of VM Project Architecture, the accompanying music video features vibrant sets with the group members singing against various backdrops. It garnered over 10 million views within five days of its release, and was awarded the Best Music Video of the year at the 2016 Mnet Asian Music Awards. Blackpink made their debut stage with the song on SBS's Inkigayo on August 14, 2016, and continued with promotion on the music program throughout August and September.

== Background and composition ==
On June 29, 2016, YG Entertainment officially confirmed that Blackpink would soon debut as a four-member girl group, marking the agency's first girl group in seven years, since the debut of 2NE1. On July 6, the group uploaded their first dance practice video to their official YouTube channel, which attracted attention among the public in regards to the group's potential style and concept. On July 29, 2016, YG announced that Blackpink's debut would take place on August 8. On August 6, the tracks "Whistle", along with "Boombayah", were revealed to be the two singles for their debut single album Square One. Both of the singles were released as planned in conjunction with the single album on August 8, 2016. The song was written by B.I, Teddy, and Bekuh Boom, with production being handled by the latter two and Future Bounce. An acoustic version of "Whistle" was included on the group's second single album Square Two in November 2016. A Japanese version of the song was included as part of the group's first eponymous Japanese EP, which was released on August 29, 2017, by YGEX.

Composed in the key signature of B major, the track contains a tempo of 103 beats per minute and has a runtime of 3:31. Musically, "Whistle" has been described as a hip-hop number with a dreamy rhythm and a mature feel, integrating whistle hooks over a minimal drum 'n' bass melody. Beginning with the gentle whisper, "Hey boy," the song transitions into a hip-hop beat which integrates instrumentations of snaps accompanied with the predominant whistling melody. Prior to the chorus, the melody shifts into an increase of percussion and guitar, as well as clapping instrumentations. The chorus then employs the same hook from the beginning of the track with the exchange between the primary whistle sounds and snaps. Lyrically, the song revolves around the themes of affection and romance. The instrumentations of whistling alludes to the sounds of a racing heartbeat, as well as the group member's desire for their romantic interests to call out to them.

== Critical reception ==
Upon its release, "Whistle" was met with positive reviews from music critics. Billboard K-Town's Jeff Benjamin opines that Blackpink "[embraces] the hip-hop sensibilities and club-ready sounds with which their seniors gained an international following", referring to their labelmates Psy, Big Bang, and 2NE1. He further stated that the song, "brings together impassioned crooning and their youthful hip-hop delivery with minimal drum 'n' bass and an undeniable whistle hook". Rolling Stone's Brittany Spanos placed Blackpink in her list of "10 New Artists You Need to Know: September 2016", saying: "[a]ll low-end boom and high-end tweets, the infectious 'Whistle' feels like perfect pop update of the similarly chirpy Ying Yang Twins classic 'Whistle While You Twurk'". Entertainment Weekly's Joey Nolfi said that the song "quickly turns up the heat, layering irresistible finger snaps, a saccharine bridge, electric guitar riffs, mammoth bass, and, of course, cow bell-accompanied whistles", and observed that the song would be suitable for American charts.

In a review of the group's discography in May 2019, Rhian Daly of NME asserted that despite the quieter nature of the track, in contrast to most of the group's songs, "it gives the band chance to command things with just their voices – something they do with ease". Following the release of the group's first Korean-language studio album in October 2020, Palmer Haasch of Insider ranked "Whistle" as their third best single overall, stating that: "From Jisoo's opening 'Hey boy,' it's cool and confident, stitched together with a whistle hook and minimalist production elements that allow the members' vocals to shine through." Billboard ranked "Whistle" the 4th best K-pop song of 2016 and the 26th best K-pop song of the 2010s, writing that it "overflows with confidence and made Blackpink's 'girl crush' concept feel impossibly fresh".

=== Accolades ===
"Whistle" received three first place music program awards in 2016, winning twice on Inkigayo (August 21, September 11), and once on M Countdown (September 8). At year-end award ceremonies, it received a nomination for Best Digital Song (Bonsang) at the 31st Golden Disc Awards. At the 2017 Gaon Chart Music Awards, it won the Artist of the Year – Digital Music (August) award. In 2023, "Whistle" became one of the first K-pop songs (along with BTS's "DNA") to be inducted into Korea World Music Culture's Hall of Fame.

== Commercial performance ==
Commercially, "Whistle" experienced success in South Korea. The song opened at number-one on the Gaon Digital Chart issue dated August 7–13, 2016, making it the group's first number-one entry on the chart. It sold 150,750 digital units and garnered 4.3 million streams, ranking at number one and number two on the component download and streaming charts, respectively. The following week, the song maintained its position as the number-one single of the week, selling an additional 124,500 digital units and received 5 million streams, and placed atop the streaming chart for the first time. By the end of the month, the song became the best-selling and most-streamed single of August, having sold 413,000 digital units. On the year-end Gaon Digital Chart, "Whistle" was named the 36th best-selling song of the year, accumulating a total of 991,628 in digital sales. Factoring together digital sales, streaming, and background music sales, the song was ranked as the 32nd best-performing song of 2016. According to the Korea Music Content Association (KMCA), "Whistle" surpassed 2.5 million digital sales in November 2019 and 100 million streams in December 2021. In the United States, "Whistle" debuted at number two on the Billboard World Digital Songs chart, behind their own song "Boombayah". Both songs on the single album Square One moved an estimated 6,000 digital units each in the first week of release, with "Boombayah" selling slightly more. In its second week on the chart, "Whistle" appeared at number three.

== Music video and live performances ==
The music video for "Whistle" was directed by Beomjin J of VM Project Architecture, and was released through Blackpink's official YouTube channel on August 8, 2016. The visual utilizes vibrant sets with the group members singing in outer space, empty corridors, and while cruising in a car. It surpassed nearly 10 million views within five days. A choreography practice video for "Whistle" was released on August 18, 2016. The music video was awarded Best Music Video of the year at the 2016 Mnet Asian Music Awards. The video surpassed 500 million views in June 2020, and 800 million views in September 2022. Blackpink began appearing on South Korea's televised music programs with the August 14, 2016, broadcast of Inkigayo. They received their first music program award for "Whistle" a week later, and became the fastest girl group to achieve the feat.

Blackpink performed the song at several award shows in South Korea, including at the 1st Asia Artist Awards on November 16. At the 2016 Melon Music Awards on November 19, 2016, the group presented a pre-recorded performance of the song whilst sporting white-colored outfits, before performing "Playing with Fire" live. They additionally performed "Whistle" at the 31st Golden Disc Awards on January 13, 2017, and the 6th Gaon Chart Music Awards on February 22. The song was added to the set list of the group's Japan Arena Tour 2018, In Your Area World Tour (2018–2020), Born Pink World Tour (2022–2023), and Deadline World Tour (2025–2026).

== Credits and personnel ==
Credits adapted from Melon.

- Blackpink – vocals
- Teddy – composer, lyricist, arranger
- Bekuh Boom – composer, lyricist
- Future Bounce – composer, arranger
- B.I – lyricist

== Charts ==
=== Weekly charts ===
Weekly chart performance for "Whistle"
| Chart (2016) | Peak position |
|---|---|
| Finland Download (Latauslista) | 24 |
| Hong Kong (HKRIA) | 3 |
| South Korea (Gaon) | 1 |
| US World Digital Songs (Billboard) | 2 |

"Whistle" (Acoustic version)
| Chart (2016) | Peak position |
|---|---|
| South Korea (Gaon) | 88 |

=== Monthly charts ===
Monthly chart performance for "Whistle"
| Chart (2016) | Peak position |
|---|---|
| South Korea (Gaon) | 1 |

=== Year-end charts ===
Year-end chart performance for "Whistle"
| Chart (2016) | Position |
|---|---|
| South Korea (Gaon) | 32 |
| US World Digital Songs (Billboard) | 15 |

== Certifications and sales ==
Certifications and sales for "Whistle"
| Region | Certification | Certified units/sales |
|---|---|---|
| New Zealand (RMNZ) | Gold | 15,000^{‡} |
| South Korea | — | 2,500,000 |
Streaming
| South Korea | — | 100,000,000 |
^{‡} Sales+streaming figures based on certification alone.

== Release history ==
Release dates and formats
| Region | Date | Format | Label | Ref. |
|---|---|---|---|---|
| Various | August 8, 2016 | Digital download; streaming | YG Entertainment | |

== See also ==
- List of Gaon Digital Chart number ones of 2016
- List of Inkigayo Chart winners (2016)
- List of K-pop songs on the Billboard charts
- List of M Countdown Chart winners (2016)
