= Playing with Fire (Blackpink song) =

Single by Blackpink

from the album Square Two
- Language: Korean; English
- Released: November 1, 2016
- Studio: The Black Label (Seoul)
- Genre: Tropical house
- Length: 3:17
- Label: YG
- Songwriter: Teddy
- Producers: Teddy; R. Tee

Blackpink singles chronology
"Whistle" / "Boombayah" (2016)	"Playing with Fire" / "Stay" (2016)	"As If It's Your Last" (2017)

Music video
- "Playing with Fire" on YouTube "Playing with Fire (JP Ver.)" on YouTube

"Playing with Fire" (Korean: 불장난; RR: Buljangnan) is a song recorded by South Korean girl group Blackpink. It was released on November 1, 2016, together with "Stay", as the group's second digital single album titled Square Two, through YG Entertainment. The song was written by Teddy and composed by him alongside R. Tee. "Playing with Fire" peaked at number three on the Gaon Digital Chart and topped the Billboard World Digital Song Sales chart, making Blackpink the K-pop female act with the most chart-toppers. It was the first song by a Korean girl group in history to enter the Canadian Hot 100.

== Background and release ==
In October 2016, a teaser image of Jennie was revealed, along with the name of one of the title tracks, "Playing With Fire", followed by teaser images of Lisa, Rosé, and Jisoo the next day. On October 31, the behind-the-scenes video for "Playing With Fire" was released. The group had their comeback stage for both songs on November 6 on SBS's Inkigayo and on Mnet's M Countdown on November 10, 2016.

== Commercial performance ==
"Playing with Fire" debuted at number 3 on South Korea's Gaon Digital Chart, with 203,263 downloads (landing at number 2 on the component Download Chart) and 3,825,893 streams (debuting at number 4 on the component Streaming Chart). The following week, it fell to number 4, before reaching number 3 again in its third week. As of September 2018, the song has reached over 2,500,000 digital downloads and 100,000,000 streams in the country.

In the United States, the song debuted at number one on the Billboard World Digital Songs chart, selling 4,000 copies in its first week of release. It marked Blackpink's second number-one song on the chart following "Whistle" earlier in the year. With this, they became the K-pop female act with the most chart-toppers, surpassing 2NE1 and CL, who each earned one number-one song. "Playing with Fire" also entered the Canadian Hot 100 at number 92, making Blackpink the first South Korean girl group and only the fifth South Korean act (after Psy, EXO, CL, and BTS) to enter the chart. In the United Kingdom, the track had reached 10.9 million streams as of 2019.

== Music video ==
A screenshot from the music video, with Blackpink members dancing the choreography of the song in a flamed area

The music video for "Playing with Fire" was directed by Seo Hyun-seung, who previously worked with the group and directed the music video for "Boombayah", and it was released on Blackpink's official YouTube channel at midnight KST on November 1, 2016. As of February 2026, the video has over 950 million views on the platform. Blackpink also released the dance practice video for "Playing With Fire" on YouTube on November 4, 2016. It was choreographed by Kyle Hanagami, who had worked with them for "Boombayah" from their previous single album Square One.

== Accolades ==
On South Korean music programs, "Playing with Fire" received two music show wins on the November 27 and December 4, 2016, episodes of Inkigayo. It won Artist of the Year – Digital Music (November) at the 2017 Gaon Chart Music Awards.

== Credits and personnel ==
Credits adapted from Melon.

- Blackpink – vocals
- Teddy – composer, lyricist
- R. Tee – composer, arranger

== Chart performance ==
=== Weekly charts ===
Weekly chart performance
Chart (2016)	Peak position
Canada Hot 100 (Billboard)	92
Japan Hot 100 (Billboard)	81
South Korea (Gaon)	3
UK Video Streaming (OCC)	99
US World Digital Songs (Billboard)	1

=== Monthly charts ===
Monthly chart performance
Chart (2016)	Peak position
South Korea (Gaon)	3

=== Year-end charts ===
Year-end chart performance
Chart (2016)	Position
South Korea (Gaon)	71

Year-end chart performance
Chart (2017)	Position
South Korea (Gaon)	33

== Certifications and sales ==
Certifications and sales
Region	Certification	Certified units/sales
New Zealand (RMNZ)	Gold	15,000^{‡}
South Korea	—	2,500,000
Streaming
Japan (RIAJ)	Gold	50,000,000^{†}
South Korea	—	100,000,000
^{‡} Sales+streaming figures based on certification alone.^{†} Streaming-only figures based on certification alone.

== Release history ==
Release dates and formats
Region	Date	Format	Label	Ref.
Various	November 1, 2016	Digital download; streaming	YG Entertainment	

== See also ==
- List of Inkigayo Chart winners (2016)
- List of K-pop songs on the Billboard charts
