= Boombayah =

- Promotional graphic

Single by Blackpink

from the album Square One
- Language: Korean; English
- Released: August 8, 2016
- Studio: The Black Label (Seoul)
- Genre: K-pop; EDM
- Length: 4:00
- Label: YG
- Songwriters: Teddy; Bekuh Boom
- Producer: Teddy

Blackpink singles chronology
"Whistle" / "Boombayah" (2016)	"Playing with Fire" / "Stay" (2016)

Audio sample
- file; help

Music video
- "Boombayah" on YouTube "Boombayah (JP Ver.)" on YouTube

"Boombayah" (Korean: 붐바야; RR: Bumbaya) is a song by South Korean girl group Blackpink for their debut single album, Square One (2016). The song was released through YG Entertainment on August 8, 2016, simultaneously with Square One's other single "Whistle".

"Boombayah" peaked at number seven on the Gaon Digital Chart and topped the Billboard World Digital Song Sales chart, making Blackpink the fastest act to top the chart in history. It has since been certified gold by the Recording Industry Association of Japan (RIAJ) for both its Korean and Japanese versions as well as by Recorded Music NZ (RMNZ), and silver by the British Phonographic Industry (BPI). The song's accompanying music video was directed by Seo Hyun-seung and was released alongside the single itself on Blackpink's YouTube channel. In October 2020, it became the first K-pop debut music video to surpass 1 billion views on YouTube.

== Background and release ==
"Boombayah" was released on August 8, 2016, at 8 p.m. KST (UTC+09:00) as a digital single titled Square One, coupled with "Whistle", through various digital music portals in South Korea. Blackpink promoted "Boombayah" at their debut stage on SBS' Inkigayo on August 14, 2016. They subsequently promoted the song for the two following weeks on Inkigayo, and also performed "Boombayah" at the 26th Seoul Music Awards on January 19, 2017.

== Critical reception ==
The song received generally positive reviews from music critics. Jeff Benjamin of Billboard K-Town said that Blackpink "embraces the hip-hop sensibilities and club-ready sounds with which their seniors gained an international following", referring to their labelmates Psy, Big Bang and 2NE1, with the song's "booming" and "exotic beats".

== Commercial performance ==
Commercially, "Boombayah" debuted at number seven on the Gaon Digital Chart in South Korea, selling 88,215 digital units and garnering 1,866,737 streams in its debut week. In the United States, "Boombayah" debuted at number one on the Billboard World Digital Songs chart for the week of August 27, 2016, ahead of their other single "Whistle" at number two. Both songs moved an estimated 6,000 digital units each in their first week of release, with "Boombayah" selling slightly more. Blackpink became only the seventh K-pop act to reach number one on the chart, joining the company of Psy, BigBang, 2NE1, Exo, CL, BTS, G-Dragon, and Taeyang. Blackpink broke the record for the fastest act to hit number one on the chart in history, and became only the third act to hold the top two positions after Psy and BigBang. Following the release of their second single album Square Two in November 2016, "Boombayah" moved from number 14 to 16 on the chart, surpassed by "Whistle". The track reached 12.7 million streams in the United Kingdom as of April 2019, and 23.4 million streams as of September 2022, becoming the group's fifth most streamed song in the country.

== Music video ==
The music video for "Boombayah" was directed by Seo Hyun-seung, who had previously directed the music videos for "I Am the Best" by 2NE1 and "Fantastic Baby" by BigBang. The video was released on Blackpink's official YouTube channel on August 8, 2016. In June 2020, it surpassed 1 billion views in four years after its release, becoming the first K-pop debut music video to reach the milestone. This made Blackpink the first K-pop group to have three videos reach 1 billion views, after "Ddu-Du Ddu-Du" (2018) and "Kill This Love" (2019). It surpassed 1.7 billion views in June 2024, their third video to cross the mark after "Ddu-Du Ddu-Du" and "Kill This Love".

== Usage in media ==
"Boombayah" was featured in the Netflix television series Wu Assassins during a fight scene in "Drunken Watermelon", the first episode of the first season. It is also included in the dance rhythm game Just Dance 2022, which uses a modified version of the official choreography. The song featured in the 2024 animated film Despicable Me 4, during a scene where lots of Minions are partying on a bus.

"Boombayah" plays in the second season (2025) of the Netflix television series Wednesday, in the episode "Woe Thyself". In the scene, Enid Sinclair, having swapped bodies with Wednesday Addams, cheerfully dances around campus in uncharacteristically colorful clothing. According to co-supervisor Nicole Weisberg, producers had the song in mind for the sequence due to the "playful" nature of the song and its lyrics, which fit with the comedic dancing used in the scene.

== Credits and personnel ==
Credits adapted from Melon.

- Blackpink – vocals
- Teddy – composer, lyricist, arranger
- Bekuh Boom – composer, lyricist

== Chart performance ==
=== Weekly charts ===
Weekly chart performance for "Boombayah"
Chart (2016–17)	Peak position
Finland Download (Latauslista)	21
France (SNEP)	196
Hong Kong (HKRIA)	9
Japan Hot 100 (Billboard)	15
South Korea (Gaon)	7
US World Digital Songs (Billboard)	1

=== Monthly charts ===
Monthly chart performance for "Boombayah"
Chart (2016)	Peak position
South Korea (Gaon)	11

=== Year-end charts ===
Year-end chart performance for "Boombayah"
Chart (2016)	Position
US World Digital Songs (Billboard)	14

== Certifications and sales ==
Certifications and sales for "Boombayah"
Region	Certification	Certified units/sales
New Zealand (RMNZ)	Gold	15,000^{‡}
South Korea	—	605,048
United Kingdom (BPI)	Silver	200,000^{‡}
Streaming
Japan (RIAJ)	Gold	50,000,000^{†}
Japan (RIAJ) Japanese version	Gold	50,000,000^{†}
^{‡} Sales+streaming figures based on certification alone.^{†} Streaming-only figures based on certification alone.

== Release history ==
Release dates and formats for "Boombayah"
Region	Date	Format	Label	Ref.
Various	August 8, 2016	Digital download; streaming	YG Entertainment	

== See also ==
- List of K-pop songs on the Billboard charts
