= Stay (Blackpink song) =

Single by Blackpink

from the album Square Two
- Language: Korean; English
- Released: November 1, 2016
- Studio: The Black Label (Seoul)
- Genre: Folk-pop
- Length: 3:50
- Label: YG
- Songwriter: Teddy
- Producers: Teddy; Seo Won-jin

Blackpink singles chronology
"Whistle" / "Boombayah" (2016)	"Playing with Fire" / "Stay" (2016)	"As If It's Your Last" (2017)

Music video
- "Stay" on YouTube "Stay (JP Ver.)" on YouTube

"Stay" is a song recorded by South Korean girl group Blackpink. It was released on November 1, 2016, together with "Playing with Fire", as the group's second digital single album titled Square Two, through YG Entertainment. The song was written by Teddy and produced by him alongside Seo Won Jin. Commercially, "Stay" peaked at number ten on the Gaon Digital Chart.

== Composition ==
"Stay" was written by YG Entertainment's chief producer Teddy, with co-composition by Seo Won-jin who also handled the arrangement and production of the entire song. The song style of "Stay" is characterized as emotional pop with folk music as its main axis. It begins with the melancholic sound of the harmonica, combined with the lyrical repetition of the guitar and accompaniment of guitar strings, presenting "the loneliness and unease felt after being left alone", with a sorrowful and melancholic country-pop style. Each member's unique vocals accompany the entire song, expressing the anxiety of a lover possibly leaving sooner or later, and the earnest desire to keep the lover by one's side.

== Background and release ==
On October 27, 2016, teaser images of all four members of Blackpink were released for the second title track "Stay" of their single Square Two. On October 30, YG Entertainment released the behind-the-scenes video of the music video for "Stay". The song and its music video were released on November 1 alongside "Playing with Fire".

== Commercial performance ==
"Stay" debuted at number ten on South Korea's Gaon Digital Chart, with 115,531 downloads (landing at number six on the component Download Chart) and 1,651,667 streams (debuting at number 28 on the component Streaming Chart). The song sold 182,138 downloads in the month of November and 61,370 in the month of December, totaling 243,508 downloads sold in 2016.

In the United States, the song debuted at number four on the Billboard World Digital Songs chart, selling nearly 3,000 copies in its first week of release.

== Live performances ==
Blackpink performed their comeback stage for "Stay" and "Playing with Fire" on November 6 on SBS's Inkigayo, and on Mnet's M Countdown on November 10, 2016.

On October 23, 2021, Blackpink performed "Stay" as part of the YouTube Originals special Dear Earth, in which they delivered a speech about the importance of dealing with climate change.

== Music video ==
The music video for "Stay" was directed by Han Sa-min, who previously directed "Gotta Be You" by 2NE1 and "Sober" by Big Bang. It was released on Blackpink's official YouTube channel at midnight on November 1, 2016 KST. In 2021, it surpassed 300 million views, becoming Blackpink's 16th video to reach this milestone.

== Credits and personnel ==
Credits adapted from Melon.

- Blackpink – vocals
- Teddy – composer, lyricist, arranger
- Seo Won-jin – composer, arranger

== Charts ==
=== Weekly charts ===
Weekly chart performance for "Stay"
Chart (2016)	Peak position
South Korea (Gaon)	10
US World Digital Songs (Billboard)	4

=== Monthly charts ===
Monthly chart performance for "Stay"
Chart (2016)	Peak position
South Korea (Gaon)	27

== Release history ==
Release dates and formats for "Stay"
Region	Date	Format	Label	Ref.
Various	November 1, 2016	Digital download; streaming	YG Entertainment	

== See also ==
- List of K-pop songs on the Billboard charts
