= The Show (concert) =

2021 online concert by Blackpink

YG Palm Stage ― 2021 Blackpink: The Show
- Online one-day concert by Blackpink
- Location: Seoul, South Korea
- Associated album: The Album
- Date: January 31, 2021
- Attendance: 280,000
- Box office: $8,900,000

Blackpink concert chronology
- In Your Area World Tour (2018–20); YG Palm Stage ― 2021 Blackpink: The Show (2021); Blackpink: The Virtual (2022)

The Show, officially titled YG Palm Stage ― 2021 Blackpink: The Show, was the first online concert by South Korean girl group Blackpink in support of their debut Korean studio album, The Album.

== Background ==
South Korean girl group Blackpink released their first Korean-language studio album, The Album, on October 2, 2020. It received generally favourable reviews from music critics, and was one of the world's best-selling albums of 2020. To promote the album, Blackpink announced their first online pay-per-view concert, The Show, for December 27, 2020. However, due to COVID-19 pandemic regulations in South Korea at the time, the concert was postponed to January 31, 2021. Under a partnership between the group's label YG Entertainment and YouTube Music, it was the first concert in YG Entertainment's online concert series "YG Palm Stage". A promotional teaser for the concert was first released on November 23, 2020. It was available exclusively on Blackpink's YouTube channel and included first-time performances of songs from The Album.

== Concert synopsis ==
The Show opened with "Kill This Love", following a video featuring sights of dark and empty cities around the world. Apart from live performances it also included several pre-recorded tracks. Each member performed their own solo stage; Jennie performed her song "Solo" with new rap lyrics written by her, and Rosé shared a preview of her solo debut "Gone", while Jisoo and Lisa performed covers of Tove Lo's "Habits (Stay High)" and Doja Cat's "Say So" respectively, both adding new self-written lyrics. The concert ended with an encore featuring a performance of "Forever Young" in which the stage was filled with messages from Blinks (Blackpink's fandom name).

== Set list ==
Act 1

1. "Kill This Love"
2. "Crazy Over You"
3. "How You Like That"

Act 2

4. "Don't Know What to Do"
5. "Playing with Fire"
6. "Lovesick Girls"

Act 3 (Solos Part 1)

7. "Habits (Stay High)" (Jisoo solo)
8. "Say So" (Lisa solo)

Act 4

9. "Sour Candy"
10. "Love To Hate Me" / "You Never Know"

Act 5 (Solos Part 2)

11. "Solo" (Jennie solo)
12. "Gone" (Rosé solo)

Act 6

13. "Pretty Savage"
14. "Ddu-Du Ddu-Du"

Act 7 – Encore

15. "Whistle"
16. "As If It's Your Last"
17. "Boombayah" (shortened)
18. "Forever Young"

== Reception ==
In an article for Billboard, Jeff Benjamin noted, "While members Jisoo, Jennie, Rosé and Lisa brought their superstar sensibilities to some of their biggest hits such as "How You Like That" and "Ddu-Du Ddu-Du", The Show... also put on full display how [Blackpink] is pushing themselves as ever-evolving entertainers offering new twists and unexpected elements to the stage." Bridget Lam of South China Morning Post felt that "[e]ven though it was fully online, viewers could feel their presence from wherever they were", and concluded, "The Show was extremely enjoyable from start to finish." Rhian Daly from the British magazine NME gave the concert a four-star rating out of five, and said, "Despite getting an energetic boost from their backing band, not every moment of The Show hits as hard as you would expect in a bouncing arena. ... though, [Blackpink] put on a concert that's a joy to watch." In the concert review, Variety's Ilana Kaplan credited "the group's choreography to their flashy costumes of tulle, feathers and corsets, the production" that made the audience "feel like they had an actual seat at the Seoul venue."

The livestream concert recorded approximately 280,000 paid subscribers, generating more than ₩10 billion (US$8.9 million) from ticket sales. The countries that had the most virtual concertgoers were the United States (gathering around 19.2% of the total concertgoers), Thailand, Philippines, Japan, India and Mexico.

== Live album ==
Blackpink 2021 'The Show' Live
- Digital cover

Live album by Blackpink
- Released: June 1, 2021
- Recorded: January 31, 2021
- Genre: K-pop
- Length: 53:33
- Language: Korean; English
- Label: YG; Interscope

Blackpink chronology
The Album (2020)	Blackpink 2021 'The Show' Live (2021)	Born Pink (2022)

Blackpink 2021 'The Show' Live is the fourth live album by Blackpink. It was released on June 1, 2021 and features live versions and performances from The Show.

On May 11, 2021, YG Entertainment announced that "The Show" would be released on CD. Officially released on June 11, the physical album contained a digipack, 2 CD discs, a photobook, 2 random photocards, and a random sticker. YG also announced that Jisoo and Lisa's solo songs on "The Show" were not included on the album due to copyright issues.

The live album was surprise-released digitally on June 1, 2021. On the same day, preorders were opened for KiT and DVD versions of "The Show", which were officially released on June 18. The KiT version included one of four different KiT VIDEOS, one of four different key-ring charms, a photocard sleeve set, and a tracklist card, while the DVD version included 2 DVDs, a photobook, a frame photo set, a random magnet set, a tracklist card, random photo cards, a sticker set, an accordion book, a post card set, and a folded poster.

=== Track listing ===
1. "Kill This Love"
2. "Crazy Over You"
3. "How You Like That"
4. "Don't Know What to Do"
5. "Playing with Fire"
6. "Lovesick Girls"
7. "Love to Hate Me + You Never Know"
8. "Solo"
9. "Gone"
10. "Pretty Savage"
11. "Ddu-Du Ddu-Du"
12. "Whistle"
13. "As If It's Your Last"
14. "Boombayah"
15. "Forever Young"

=== Charts ===
==== Weekly charts ====
Weekly chart performance for Blackpink 2021 'The Show' Live
Chart (2021)	Peak position
South Korean Albums (Gaon)	8

==== Monthly charts ====
Monthly chart performance for Blackpink 2021 'The Show' Live
Chart (2021)	Peak position
South Korean Albums (Gaon)	24

=== Certifications and sales ===
Certifications and sales for Blackpink 2021 'The Show' Live
Region	Certification	Certified units/sales
South Korea	—	34,906

=== Release history ===
Region	Date	Format	Label	Ref.
Various	1 June 2021	Digital download; streaming	YG; Interscope	
South Korea	11 June 2021	CD	YG; Interscope	
South Korea	18 June 2021	Kit Video; DVD	YG; Interscope	
