= Loren (musician) =

South Korean musician

LØREN
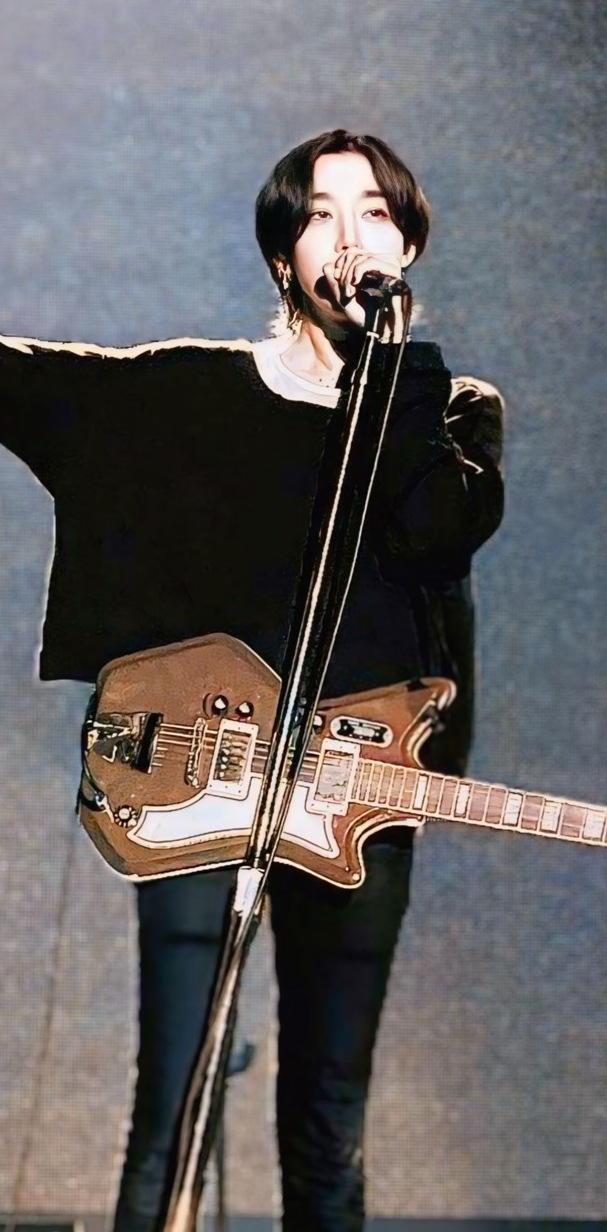
- Loren performing in April 2024
- Born: Lee Seung-joo; January 10, 1995 (age 31); Seoul, South Korea
- Other name: cawlr
- Occupations: Singer; songwriter; producer
- Father: Lee Hae-jin
- Musical career
- Genres: K-pop; heavy rock; punk-pop; indie
- Instruments: Vocals; guitar; drums
- Years active: 2015–present
- Labels: The Black Label; Fire Exit Records; 88rising; AYLA
- Website: lorensbasement.com

Korean name
- Hangul: 이승주
- RR: I Seungju
- MR: I Sŭngju

Lee Seung-joo (Korean: 이승주), better known by his stage name Loren (로렌, stylized as LØREN), is a South Korean singer-songwriter and producer under AYLA, formerly releasing music through The Black Label as well as his own indie label, Fire Exit Records. He debuted as a singer on November 13, 2020, with his heavy rock track "Empty Trash". He is credited as an arranger on G-Dragon's 2017 song, "개소리 (Bullshit)", and as a lyricist on Blackpink's songs "Pretty Savage", "You Never Know", and "Lovesick Girls".

== Early life and education ==
Loren was born to South Korean parents. His father is Lee Hae-jin, Naver's founder and Global Investment Officer (GIO), and his mother is Lee Young-rin. He also has one sister, Lee Yeon-joo. When Loren was around 5th grade, he moved to Singapore and studied at the Singapore American School.

== Career ==
=== 2015–2017: Beginnings and contract with The Black Label ===
Between the age of 19 and 20, Lee's main goal was to make rap and dubstep beats. He would send the music he made to people he thought might listen to his work, including The Black Label. They offered Lee the chance to work with them and practice as a producer in 2017. Lee soon went on to Seoul's nightclub scene to hone his skills as an EDM producer and DJ under the name of DJ Boid. Through this work, Lee got the chance to work with one of the best-selling and well-known artists in Korea, G-Dragon. From this connection, Lee obtained a producer credit, under the name Cawlr, on one of GD's hits, "Bullshit (개소리)".

Lee also worked as a model, posing for W Korea and for the brand of Korean designer Choi Moo-yul, Vlad Vladis. In October 2017, a celebrity launch party hosted by Italian fashion house Fendi called "F is for.." celebrated Taeyang's collection with the brand in Hong Kong. Lee was one of the DJs at the event, alongside other well-known DJs in the Asian music scene.

=== 2018–2022: Work with Blackpink, solo debut and work on fashion ===
In 2020, Lee participated in Blackpink's The Album; he is credited as a co-lyricist on three of the eight tracks - "Pretty Savage", "You Never Know", and "Lovesick Girls". Lee also had a cameo appearance in the music video for "Lovesick Girls". Before participating in the music video, Lee featured in two studio live streams with Rosé as a guitarist. Additionally, Rosé, on her 25th birthday, surprised her fans by uploading on her personal Youtube channel three covers of songs by Coldplay, Neck Deep and Oasis, with the help of Lee playing the acoustic guitar.

Under The Black Label, Lee has his own indie record company, Fire Exit RECØRDS. He also has a distribution company AWAL. The Black Label states that he isn't a singer under the company and that his company is separate from the label.

Lee said the meaning of his name comes from one of the tattoos on his chest, "LØNER". The word is formed by changing the positions of R and N. Lee's fandom is called Løners, inspired by the same tattoo.

Lee made his debut on November 13, 2020, with the release of "Empty Trash". The song is influenced by early 2000s rock bands with heavier rock sounds. Lee released his second single, "Need (ooo-eee)", on July 21, 2021. It is a post-grunge, melancholy punk pop song, with lyrics which recalls the summers of his childhood. In November 2021, he released his third song, "All My Friends Are Turning Blue". This song marks the first time Lee played with a band.

Fashion magazine Dazed Korea put Lee on the cover of its 2022 March issue with Rosé. Eight covers were published, all with Rosé and Lee wearing Yves Saint Laurent's fresh collection. Lee was also spotted at the Paris Fashion Week in March 2022 at Yves Saint Laurent's fashion show by Anthony Vaccarello. In April of the same year, he uploaded on Instagram a photo of him alongside the logo of the fashion brand, Saint Laurent, announcing Lee as a model and representative of Saint Laurent's 2022 Eyewear Campaign. Lee was the first male solo artist from Korea chosen by the brand as their model.

=== 2023–present: Debut album ===
In March 2023, alongside the announcement of his debut EP Put Up a Fight, Lee signed to the recording label 88rising, through which he would release his project in partnership with The Black Label. NME regarded his album as "a collection of defiant alternative rock anthems, soaring guitar riffs inspiring the kind of adrenaline that comes with a battle for survival."

Lee shared that the five songs on the album were the ones he felt most dear about as they pushed his musical boundaries. Put Up a Fight allowed him to express the frustration from the public eye and how quickly people have an opinion about somebody just because someone else says so, and also about the self-doubt he faced while writing the album.

After a successful showcase at SXSW, Løren performed as part of Coachella's 2023 line-up, marking his first appearance there.

In 2024, he released the single "Gasoline" in cooperation with 88rising's group 1999 Write The Future.

In 2025, he left The Black Label for independent label AYLA, where he subsequently released the single "Fuck Your Neighbour (FYN)"

== Influences ==
Lee states that his music is mainly influenced by the style of the 90s and 2000s. The songwriters and performers he most admires are Julian Casablancas, Jack White, Damon Albarn, Liam Gallagher, Kurt Cobain, and Pete Doherty. In an interview with NME, he talked about how music helped him throughout his teenage years, as the message of freedom of speech and opinions charmed him. At that time, he recalls, artists like Paramore, Muse and Vampire Weekend had sparked his love as well.

== Discography ==
=== Extended plays ===
List of extended plays, showing selected details
Title	Details
Put Up a Fight	Released: March 24, 2023; Label: The Black Label, 88rising; Formats: CD, digital download, streaming

=== Singles ===
List of singles, showing year released, selected chart positions, and name of the album
Title	Year	Peak chart positions	Album
Title	Year	KOR	Album
"Empty Trash"	2020	—	Non-album singles
"Need (ooo-eee)"	2021	—	Non-album singles
"All My Friends Are Turning Blue"	2021	—	Non-album singles
"Folks"	2023	—	Put Up a Fight
"Gasoline" (with 1999 Write The Future)	2024	—	Non-album singles
"Fuck Your Neighbour (FYN)"	2025	—	Non-album singles
"—" denotes a recording that did not chart or was not released in that territory

=== Composition credits ===
All song credits are adapted from the Korea Music Copyright Association's database unless stated otherwise.

List of songs, showing year released, artist name, and name of the album
Title	Year	Artist	Album	Composer	Lyricist	Arranger
"Bullshit" (개소리)	2017	G-Dragon	Kwon Ji Yong	Yes	No	Yes
"Lovesick Girls"	2020	Blackpink	The Album	No	Yes	No
"Pretty Savage"	2020	Blackpink	The Album	No	Yes	No
"You Never Know"	2020	Blackpink	The Album	No	Yes	No
"Empty Trash"	2020	Himself	Non-album singles	Yes	Yes	Yes
"Need (ooo-eee)"	2021	Himself	Non-album singles	Yes	Yes	Yes
"All My Friends Are Turning Blue"	2021	Himself	Non-album singles	Yes	Yes	Yes
"Folks"	2023	Himself	"Put Up a Fight"	Yes	Yes	Yes
"Temporary"	2023	Himself	"Put Up a Fight"	Yes	Yes	Yes
"Sticks And Stones"	2023	Himself	"Put Up a Fight"	Yes	Yes	Yes
"Panic"	2023	Himself	"Put Up a Fight"	Yes	Yes	Yes
"Frown"	2023	Himself	"Put Up a Fight"	Yes	Yes	Yes

== Videography ==
=== Music videos ===
Title	Year	Director	Ref.
"Empty Trash"	2020	Himself	
"Need (ooo-eee)"	2021	Himself	
"All My Friends Are Turning Blue"	2021	Himself	
"Folks"	2023	Himself	
"Panic"	2023	—N/a	
"Gasoline" (with 1999 Write The Future)	2024	Mamesjad	
