= Pretty Savage =

2020 song by Blackpink

Song by Blackpink

from the album The Album
- Language: Korean; English
- Released: October 2, 2020
- Studio: The Black Label (Seoul)
- Genre: Trap
- Length: 3:19
- Label: YG; Interscope
- Composers: Teddy; R.Tee; 24; Bekuh Boom
- Lyricists: Teddy; Løren; Vince; Danny Chung

Audio video
- "Pretty Savage" on YouTube

"Pretty Savage" is a song recorded by South Korean girl group Blackpink from their debut Korean studio album The Album. It was released on October 2, 2020, through YG and Interscope. The track was composed by Teddy, R.Tee, 24, Bekuh Boom, with lyrics written by Teddy, Løren, Vince, and Danny Chung. Lyrically, the song deals with the group not caring about the opinion of others. The song was performed with "Lovesick Girls" on several music programs in South Korea including Show! Music Core and Inkigayo and also at The Late Late Show With James Corden as a preview performance for their headlining livestream concert, The Show.

"Pretty Savage" peaked at number 32 on the Billboard Global 200 and was a top-ten hit in Malaysia and Singapore. It also debuted in the national charts of several countries, including Australia, Canada, New Zealand, and South Korea. In the United States, the song debuted at number two on the World Digital Song Sales chart and number 21 on the Bubbling Under Hot 100 chart. The song has since been certified gold by the Australian Recording Industry Association and Recorded Music NZ.

== Background and promotion ==
"Pretty Savage" was confirmed with the album's tracklist on September 28, 2020. "Pretty Savage" was performed with "Lovesick Girls" on music and variety shows with in October following the release of the album. On October 10, the group made the debut performance of the song at MBC's Show! Music Core. The next day Blackpink performed the song on Inkigayo.

Blackpink also did an interview with James Corden on The Late Late Show With James Corden as part of the group's US promotion for their virtual concert "The Show" and then performed the track as a preview for the said concert. The Japanese version of the track was released as part of The Album -JP Ver.- which was made available on August 3, 2021.

== Composition ==
"Pretty Savage"
A 18-second sample of "Pretty Savage", incorporating staccato-style beats with elements of pop and trap.

"Pretty Savage" was written by Teddy, Danny Chung, Løren and Vince, with production being handled by Teddy alongside 24, R. Tee and Bekuh Boom. The song runs for a duration of three minutes and nineteen seconds. "Pretty Savage" is a trap song with "haunted vocals and a skittish, staccato-style beat", those lyrics are a "collective middle finger to the haters". The song is about how the group's success comes by being different from everyone else.

== Critical reception ==
The song was met with generally positive reviews from critics. Writing for Billboard, Jason Lipshutz ranked "Pretty Savage" as the best song on the album, calling it "hypnotic during its ferocious high points" and one of the best Blackpink songs. Callie Ahlgrim from Insider called "Pretty Savage" a "straight shot of adrenaline" and noted that the lyrics "Yeah, we some bitches you can't manage" are an "ace-in-the-hole". Writing for Rolling Stone, Tim Chan labelled it as the "sassiest kiss-off track since" Ariana Grande's "Thank U, Next". In a more negative review, Mikael Wood for the Los Angeles Times described the song, alongside "How You Like That", as "two vaguely phrased declarations of fierce self-determination".

== Usage in media ==
"Pretty Savage" was featured in the 2021 Netflix film To All the Boys: Always and Forever. South Korean boy band iKon performed a remake of the song entitled "Classy Savage" with a guest appearance by Lisa in the 2021 Mnet competition show Kingdom: Legendary War. "Pretty Savage" is featured in the soundtrack of the 2021 Brazilian telenovela Quanto Mais Vida, Melhor!, which was broadcast beginning in November 2021.

== Credits and personnel ==
Credits adapted from the liner notes of The Album and The Album – JP Ver.

Recording

- Recorded at The Black Label Studio (Seoul)
- Mixed at The Lab (Los Angeles) and MixStar Studios (Virginia Beach, Virginia)
- Mastered at Sterling Sound (New York City)

Personnel

- Blackpink – vocals
- Teddy – lyricist, composer, arranger
- Løren – lyricist
- Vince – lyricist
- Danny Chung – lyricist
- FanFan – lyricist (Japanese version)
- R.Tee – composer, arranger
- 24 – composer, arranger
- Yong In Choi – recording engineer
- Jason Robert – mixing engineer
- Serban Ghenea – mixing engineer
- Randy Merrill – mastering engineer

== Charts ==
=== Weekly charts ===
Weekly chart performance for "Pretty Savage"
Chart (2020)	Peak position
Australia (ARIA)	71
Canada Hot 100 (Billboard)	87
Global 200 (Billboard)	32
Greece International (IFPI)	86
Hong Kong (HKRIA)	20
Malaysia (RIM)	2
New Zealand Hot Singles (RMNZ)	8
Portugal (AFP)	64
Singapore (RIAS)	3
South Korea (Gaon)	45
South Korea (K-pop Hot 100)	36
US Bubbling Under Hot 100 (Billboard)	21
US World Digital Song Sales (Billboard)	2

=== Monthly charts ===
Monthly chart performance for "Pretty Savage"
Chart (2020)	Peak position
South Korea (Gaon)	51

== Certifications ==
Certifications for "Pretty Savage"
Region	Certification	Certified units/sales
Australia (ARIA)	Gold	35,000^{‡}
Brazil (Pro-Música Brasil)	3× Platinum	120,000^{‡}
New Zealand (RMNZ)	Gold	15,000^{‡}
^{‡} Sales+streaming figures based on certification alone.

== See also ==
- List of best-selling girl group singles
- List of K-pop songs on the Billboard charts
