= Bullshit (disambiguation) =

Bullshit is a common expletive, meaning nonsense.

Bullshit may also refer to:

- Cow dung
- Bullshit (game), a card game
- Penn & Teller: Bullshit!, an American television series
- Speech intended to persuade without regard for truth, as described in On Bullshit by Harry Frankfurt
  - Erroneous output of artificial intelligence large language models, produced without regard for truth, also known as hallucination

== Songs ==
- Bullshit (G-Dragon song), a 2017 song by G-Dragon
- "Bullshit", a song by Dune Rats from their 2017 album The Kids Will Know It's Bullshit
- "Bullshit", a song by Grace Jones from her 1980 album Warm Leatherette
- "Bullshit", a song by Momus from his 2016 album Scobberlotchers
- "Bullshit", a song by X Ambassadors from their 2021 album The Beautiful Liar

== See also ==
- Bullshit bingo, also known as buzzword bingo
- Bullshit Detector, a series of albums by the band Crass
