= Bet You Wanna =

2020 song by Blackpink featuring Cardi B

Song by Blackpink featuring Cardi B

from the album The Album
- Released: October 2, 2020
- Studio: The Black Label (Seoul)
- Genre: Pop
- Length: 2:39
- Label: YG; Interscope
- Composers: Tommy Brown; Mr. Franks
- Lyricists: Tommy Brown; Steven Franks; Ryan Tedder; Melanie Joy Fontana; Belcalis Almanzar; Torae Carr; Jonathan Descartes

Audio video
- "Bet You Wanna" on YouTube

"Bet You Wanna" is a song by South Korean girl group Blackpink featuring American rapper Cardi B. It was released on October 2, 2020, through YG and Interscope as a part of the group's debut Korean-language studio album The Album, and was scheduled to impact US contemporary hit radio on November 10, 2020, as the album's fourth single, but was ultimately never sent or promoted. The track was written by Cardi B with Tommy Brown, Steven Franks, Ryan Tedder, Melanie Joy Fontana, and Torae Carr, and composed by Franks and Brown.

"Bet You Wanna" was positively reviewed by critics and reached number four in Malaysia and Singapore, number 14 in South Korea, and the top 100 in Australia, Canada, Ireland, Japan, Portugal, the United Kingdom, and Wallonia. In the United States, the song debuted at number one on the Bubbling Under Hot 100 chart.

== Background ==
On September 29, 2020, the song was first teased by Cardi B on her Twitter. Upon release, the rapper revealed that she had previously struggled keeping her lyrics clean, saying "it really hard for me to do a verse with no curse words and PG". She followed the tweet up by posting a snippet of an extended version with explicit lyrics. After being attacked by fans of the group on Twitter, she clarified that the fan base makes "relationships with artists very weird" and that she already got paid for her verse. The collaboration serves as the group's first rap feature in any of their songs. The rapper featured the song title in a tweet to United States President Donald Trump in light of his positive COVID-19 case, writing "'Bet You Wanna' wear a mask now". The song was set to be sent to US contemporary hit radio on November 10, 2020, as the album's fourth single. On November 10, it was announced that the song would not impact the radio.

== Composition ==
"Bet You Wanna" was written by Tommy Brown, Steven Franks, Ryan Tedder, Melanie Joy Fontana, Belcalis Almanzar, and Torae Carr, composed by Franks and Brown, and arranged by the latter two with Teddy. Lyrically, the song is about promising your significant other a good time until "said person is hooked". It was furthermore described as "an upbeat party" pop cut with a simple beat enhanced by the group's voices and Cardi's rap flow.

== Critical reception ==
Rap-Up called the song a "club-ready bop", while "Cardi sets it off with a fierce and fiery verse". Starr Bownbank of Yahoo thought the song was "one of the catchier bops of the year". Shaad D'Souza at Paper included the song in his "10 New Songs You Need to Hear Now" list, saying it "makes a lot out of its minimal, percussive production". Ranking it the fourth best track of the album, Billboard's Jason Lipshutz opined that "the anthem for the admiring boys is playfully soulful, with Jennie and Rosé showcasing their vocals and Cardi keeping it rated PG".

== Usage in media ==
In 2022, "Bet You Wanna" appeared in the second episode of the HBO Max television series Pretty Little Liars: Original Sin.

== Commercial performance ==
The song debuted at number 4 on the New Zealand Hot Singles chart, and also charted in Australia, Ireland, Scotland, South Korea and the UK the week of its debut. By the end of 2020, the song had reached 19,600,000 streams in the US.

== Credits and personnel ==
Credits adapted from the liner notes of The Album.

Recording

- Recorded at The Black Label Studio (Seoul)
- Mixed at The Lab (Los Angeles) and MixStar Studios (Virginia Beach, Virginia)
- Mastered at Sterling Sound (New York City)

Personnel

- Blackpink – vocals
- Cardi B – featured vocals, lyricist
- Tommy Brown – lyricist, composer, arranger
- Steven Franks – lyricist, composer, arranger
- Ryan Tedder – lyricist
- Melanie Joy Fontana – lyricist
- Torae Carr – lyricist
- Jonathan Descartes – lyricist
- Mr. Franks – lyricist
- Teddy – arranger
- Yong In Choi – recording engineer
- Jason Robert – mixing engineer
- Serban Ghenea – mixing engineer
- Randy Merrill – mastering engineer

== Charts ==
=== Weekly charts ===
Weekly chart performance for "Bet You Wanna"
Chart (2020)	Peak position
Australia (ARIA)	42
Belgium (Ultratip Bubbling Under Wallonia)	32
Canada Hot 100 (Billboard)	58
Global 200 (Billboard)	25
Greece International (IFPI)	70
Ireland (IRMA)	43
Japan (Japan Hot 100)	99
Lithuania (AGATA)	45
Malaysia (RIM)	4
Netherlands (Single Tip)	22
Netherlands (Global Top 40)	17
New Zealand Hot Singles (RMNZ)	4
Portugal (AFP)	45
Scottish Singles Sales (Official Charts)	94
Singapore (RIAS)	4
South Korea (Gaon)	34
South Korea (K-pop Hot 100)	14
Sweden (Sverigetopplistan)	65
UK Singles (Official Charts)	62
US Bubbling Under Hot 100 (Billboard)	1

=== Monthly charts ===
Monthly chart performance for "Bet You Wanna"
Chart (2020)	Peak position
South Korea (Gaon)	41

== Certifications ==
Certifications for "Bet You Wanna"
Region	Certification	Certified units/sales
Brazil (Pro-Música Brasil)	Platinum	40,000^{‡}
^{‡} Sales+streaming figures based on certification alone.

== See also ==
- List of K-pop songs on the Billboard charts
