= The Album (Blackpink album) =

2020 studio album released by Blackpink

- Digital and standard cover

Studio album by Blackpink
- Released: October 2, 2020
- Recorded: 2019–2020
- Studio: The Black Label (Seoul)
- Genres: Pop; EDM; hip hop
- Length: 24:28
- Languages: Korean; English
- Labels: YG; Interscope
- Producers: Teddy; Tommy Brown; Steven Franks; R. Tee; 24; Tushar Apte; Rob Grimaldie

Blackpink chronology
Blackpink 2019–2020 World Tour in Your Area – Tokyo Dome (2020)	The Album (2020)	Blackpink 2021 'The Show' Live (2021)

Singles from The Album
- 1. "How You Like That" Released: June 26, 2020; 2. "Ice Cream" Released: August 28, 2020; 3. "Lovesick Girls" Released: October 2, 2020

The Album is the first studio album by South Korean girl group Blackpink. It was released on October 2, 2020, through YG Entertainment and Interscope Records. It is the group's first full-length work since their debut in 2016. For the album, Blackpink recorded over ten new songs and worked with a variety of producers, including Teddy, Tommy Brown, R. Tee, Steven Franks, and 24. Eight songs made the final tracklist, including two collaborations: "Ice Cream" with Selena Gomez, and "Bet You Wanna" featuring Cardi B. The album explores the themes of love and the complexities of growing up. Musically, The Album utilizes pop, R&B, hip hop, EDM, and trap elements.

The Album was supported by three singles in total, two of which were pre-released and became top-forty hits on the US Billboard Hot 100. Lead single "How You Like That" landed at number 33; "Ice Cream" peaked at number 13 to become Blackpink's highest-charting song in the United States; "Lovesick Girls" reached number 59 on the chart. All three singles also became top-ten hits in South Korea, with "How You Like That" peaking at number one for three weeks, "Ice Cream" at number eight, and "Lovesick Girls" at number two on the Gaon Digital Chart. To promote the album, Blackpink appeared on several music programs in South Korea and talk shows in the United States, in addition to headlining a virtual pay-per-view concert, titled "The Show" on January 31, 2021. The Album received generally favorable reviews from music critics, who commended Blackpink's stylistic variety, though some found the album short and its production outdated.

The Album debuted at number one on the Gaon Album Chart and sold 1,092,550 copies in its first month, becoming the best-selling album by a female act in South Korea at the time and the first in the chart's history to surpass one million sales. It also debuted at number two on the US Billboard 200 with 110,000 units moved and became the highest-charting female Korean album and the highest-charting album by an all-female group since Danity Kane's Welcome to the Dollhouse (2008). Elsewhere, it reached number one in South Korea and New Zealand and opened in the top ten in 16 countries. The Album has since been certified million by the Korea Music Content Association (KMCA) and gold by the British Phonographic Industry (BPI) and Recorded Music NZ (RMNZ). According to the International Federation of the Phonographic Industry (IFPI), the album was the fifth best-selling album worldwide in pure sales in 2020.

== Background and development ==
On May 4, 2020, it was reported that the group had finished recording their new album and were scheduled to shoot a music video later that month. On May 18, the group's Korean label, YG Entertainment, shared an update on the project, which was originally teased for June. The label revealed that more than ten songs were recorded for the album.

On June 7, YG Entertainment released a prologue of Blackpink's newest reality show, 24/365 with Blackpink, ahead of its launch on YouTube. The show documented the group's comeback while also sharing details of their lives through vlogs. On June 10, YG posted the teaser poster to the pre-release single on numerous social media platforms, revealing the date for the single's launch to be June 26. Starting on June 15, a series of teasers were posted every day on the group's official social media accounts with the featured single revealed as "How You Like That" on June 17. The music video teaser was released on June 24.

On July 23, YG Entertainment released a teaser poster for a new collaboration single between the group and a then-unconfirmed artist, set to be released in August. On July 28, the band announced that the album would be titled The Album and that it would be released on October 2, 2020. On August 12, 2020, the unconfirmed artist was revealed to be American singer-songwriter Selena Gomez. On August 21, 2020, it was revealed that the title of the collaboration would be "Ice Cream". On August 27, 2020, Blackpink released a teaser for the music video for "Ice Cream".

In a September 2020 interview with American DJ and radio host Zach Sang, Blackpink revealed that the album was "jam-packed with all these different surprises, as much as 'Ice Cream' was a big surprise". They added that record producer Tommy Brown collaborated on two songs for the album, including "Ice Cream". On September 27, the group announced a live comeback event scheduled on October 1. On September 28, it was announced that "Lovesick Girls" would be released on October 2 as the third and primary single off of the album. The same day, Blackpink revealed the album's track listing, which confirmed first-time songwriting contributions from members Jennie and Jisoo and additional collaborations with rapper Cardi B and record producers David Guetta and Ryan Tedder.

On June 2, 2021, Universal Music Japan announced that the group would release a Japanese version of The Album on August 3, 2021. The release included Japanese versions for four out of the eight tracks – "How You Like That", "Pretty Savage", "Lovesick Girls", and "You Never Know" – and came in 12 different physical editions.

== Composition ==
=== Music and lyrics ===
The standard edition of The Album is about twenty-four minutes long. American singer Selena Gomez collaborated on "Ice Cream" and rapper Cardi B featured on "Bet You Wanna". The Album was written and produced by Teddy, Tommy Brown, Mr. Franks, Ariana Grande, Selena Gomez, Jennie, Jisoo, Brian Lee, and David Guetta, among others. Jisoo and Jennie participated in the composing and writing of "Lovesick Girls". At eight tracks, the album is the longest Korean material in Blackpink's catalog. Musically, The Album is a pop and EDM record with R&B, hip hop and rock influences. Blackpink explained that The Album is meant to show a more mature side of the group by singing about a diversity emotions experienced by girls growing up, rather than just singing about love.

=== Songs ===
The opening track, "How You Like That", is a pop, trap and hip-hop song infused with regal horn blasts and a braggadocious hook, accompanied by elements of Arabic music during Lisa's second verse rap. The lyrics deliver a "positive and hopeful" message about "not being daunted by dark situations and to not lose the confidence and strength to stand up again". The second song, "Ice Cream" with Selena Gomez, is an electropop and bubblegum pop song with elements of trap. The song's lyrics are sung mostly in English, with the exception of a Korean verse. Lyrically, the song mainly consists of ice cream-related double entendres. "Pretty Savage", the third song, is a trap song with chanted vocals and a skittish, staccato-style beat with a prowling piano in the background. It is about how the group's success came from being different than everyone else. Rolling Stone labelled the song as the "sassiest kiss-off track since" Ariana Grande's "Thank U, Next". The fourth track, "Bet You Wanna", featuring Cardi B, is a song with bubblegum pop lyrics. The track features a simple beat enhanced by the group's voices and Cardi's rap flow. The song is about promising your significant other a good time until "said person is hooked".

The teen pop number "Lovesick Girls" is a dance-pop and electropop track with 2000s influences. Incorporating acoustic guitar and EDM sound, the song is about the pain after a heartbreak. Sputnikmusic compared the track positively to the band's 2017 disco single, "As If It's Your Last". "Crazy Over You", the sixth song, is a retro hip-hop song arrangement into a minimalist trap rhythm and Balkan whistle coupled with surf rock guitar sounds. The seventh song, "Love to Hate Me", is a dance-pop track, with a bass-heavy trap beat. The song is about dismissing a jealous and "stupid" ex-lover. The closing track, "You Never Know", is a heartfelt pop ballad with "majestic vocals and a sense of triumph". Thematically, the track is about patience and empathy.

== Conception and recording ==
Blackpink was scheduled to do a world tour in the summer of 2020, but their plans changed due to the COVID-19 pandemic, so they began work on their second album. Blackpink member Rosé stated "I think it has made us more focused into completing the album and making it the best thing we can give to our fans." The album was recorded from January to August 2020 at The Black Label studios in Seoul.

"We felt very supported making this album. Being able to tell such personal stories, and to see our fans react to them now is so exciting! In the studio we also had a lot of fun all working together and collaborating on our music."

— Jisoo on how it was like recording The Album in the studio, Teen Vogue

=== Title ===
While promoting the album on Jimmy Kimmel Live! on October 21, 2020, member Rosé revealed they had had many naming ideas for the album. "We had a bunch of ideas," she stated, "but at the end of the day, we knew that our fans were waiting so much for our album that we decided to go with something that just described it the best: 'Blackpink: The Album' sounded straightforward."

== Artwork and packaging ==
The standard edition was physically released on CD, cassette tape, and vinyl, and made available for digital download and streaming. The deluxe edition comes in four box set versions, each containing a CD, a photobook, six postcards, two photocards, a sticker, a credits sheet, a mounted photocard, a poster and two group photo cards. On October 8, YG Entertainment revealed the official The Album and "Lovesick Girls" merchandise on its official shop, YG Select. 4 Polaroid cards with undisclosed selfies of the members were gifted for any purchase of items on pre-order status. On October 14, Limited Cashbee transportation cards were made available for sale at YG Select and on specialized retailers' websites.

The Japanese release of the album was released with twelve physical editions. Alongside the regular edition, there are three limited editions featuring visuals from one of the singles: "How You Like That" for Version A, "Lovesick Girls" for Version B, and "Ice Cream" for Version C. Each limited edition comes with A4 size photo booklets, B3 posters, circular BIG cards, and photo cards for its concept. There are additionally four solo versions, one for each member, each of which is a magazine-type luxury package that uses solo photographs for the CD jacket, design, and booklet. The special edition includes a video on DVD and Blu-ray of the online concert The Show held in January 2021.

=== Cover artwork ===
The album's standard edition artwork depicts the group's logo in pink font under a shining pink crown against a stark black background, which was first unveiled in a teaser poster by YG Entertainment in July 2020 along with the album's official release date. The artwork was designed by a Seoul-based design studio, VBstudio. In August, the group unveiled that the physical editions would be available in four versions along with a limited edition LP.

== Promotion ==
=== Marketing ===
On September 27, Blackpink released an exclusive playlist on Spotify which shows the music the members were listening to while they worked on the album. On October 1, the group held a comeback live event on a South Korean live video streaming service V Live in celebration of the release day of their debut studio album. On October 14, 2020, it was announced that Blackpink would hold a special live session on TikTok on October 21. YG Entertainment stated the event's purpose was to have the members grow closer to their fans. The group gave interviews on Jimmy Kimmel Live!, Apple Music's New Music Daily hosted by Zane Lowe, and the Zach Sang Show. Blackpink appeared on the magazine cover of Elle's October issue.

=== Live performances ===
On June 27, 2020, Blackpink performed "How You Like That" for the first time at The Tonight Show Starring Jimmy Fallon. The song was performed in June and July on several music programs in South Korea, including Show! Music Core and Inkigayo. "Lovesick Girls" and "Pretty Savage" were performed on music and variety shows in October following the release of the album. On October 21, 2020, Blackpink performed "Lovesick Girls" on Good Morning America and Jimmy Kimmel Live!. On November 25, the group performed "Lovesick Girls" at the Waktu Indonesia Belanja, an event held by e-commerce platform Tokopedia.

=== Singles ===
"How You Like That", released June 26, 2020, serves as the lead single from The Album. The release was accompanied by a music video, directed by Seo Hyun-seung, which was released on the group's official YouTube channel the same day. The music video amassed 86.3 million views within its first day of release, breaking the record for the most viewed music video in its first 24 hours (previously held by BTS' "Boy with Luv") and was the fastest video to hit 100 million views, doing so 32 hours after release. On July 16, a physical version was released for purchase on Blackpink's official website, featuring the song and its instrumental. The song debuted at number 33 on the US Billboard Hot 100 chart, becoming Blackpink's second top-forty debut. In South Korea, the song peaked at number one on the Gaon Digital Chart for three weeks, earning Blackpink their third number-one single in the country.

"Ice Cream" with Selena Gomez was released as the second single from the album on August 28, 2020. The single was then serviced to contemporary hit radio on September 1. It peaked at number 13 on the Billboard Hot 100, becoming Blackpink's highest-charting single in the US. The song also reached number 8 in its second week in South Korea. An official music video for the song was released on August 28, 2020. The video shows Gomez and Blackpink in a number of colorful, pastel sets and outfits.

"Lovesick Girls" was released as the third single on October 2, 2020. Blackpink announced the song to be the main track off of the album with the single announcement on September 28. An accompanying music video for the song was directed by Seo Hyun-seung and uploaded onto Blackpink's YouTube channel simultaneously with the single's release. The song debuted at number 59 on the Billboard Hot 100 and peaked at number two on South Korea's Gaon Digital Chart. Globally, "Lovesick Girls" debuted at number two on the Billboard Global 200 and at number one on the Global Excl. U.S., becoming Blackpink's first number-one single on the latter chart.

=== Other songs ===
"Bet You Wanna" was set to be sent to US contemporary hit radio on November 10, 2020, as the album's fourth single. On November 10, it was announced that the song would not impact the radio. Upon the album's release, the song debuted and peaked at number one on the US Bubbling Under Hot 100 and was the highest peaking non-single of the project on the chart.

=== The Show ===
On December 3, 2020, it was announced that Blackpink would headline a virtual pay-per-view concert to promote their album, set for launch on January 31, 2021. "The Show", available exclusively on Blackpink's YouTube channel, included first-time performances of songs from The Album and Rosé's upcoming solo "Gone". The event served as the inaugural event in YG Entertainment's "YG Palm Stage" livestream concert brand, which aims to bring artists and fans closer "through a new performance environment that unfolds in the hands of the audience."

== Critical reception ==
Professional ratings
Aggregate scores
Source	Rating
AnyDecentMusic?	6.4/10
Metacritic	71/100
Review scores
Source	Rating
AllMusic	4/5 stars
Associated Press	Positive
Consequence of Sound	B−
The Daily Telegraph	4/5 stars
The Guardian	4/5 stars
Insider	8.1/10
IZM	3/5 stars
Rolling Stone	3.5/5 stars
Slant Magazine	3/5 stars
Sputnikmusic	2.4/5 stars
The Times	2/5 stars

The Album was met with generally favorable reviews from critics. At Metacritic, which assigns a normalized rating out of 100 to reviews from mainstream publications, the album received a weighted average score of 71 based on 8 reviews, indicating "generally favorable reviews".

Neil Z. Yeung of AllMusic said "overflowing with confidence, Jisoo, Jennie, Rosé, and Lisa conquer each track on The Album with their vocal ability (both singing and rapping) and effortless charm, switching up styles to offer something for every type of fan." Alexis Petridis from The Guardian praised the album's production calling it a "precision-tooled rap-influenced pop that makes most western artists' efforts in that area seem wan", but critiqued the lack of an "overarching concept". Writing for The Daily Telegraph, Neil McCormick wrote that the tracks "sounds like five different songs tightly packed into one" and that the album "is Britney Spearmint Bubblegum on steroids". For Rolling Stone, Tim Chan wrote that "the eight-song set is a slick, confident and wildly entertaining release from the biggest girl group in the world". From Insider, Callie Ahlgrim said that The Album "feels more like a playlist" whose songs do not form a group. On a positive note, she referred to the songs as being "eight straight shots of multicolored, sugary liquors". Palmer Haasch said that the album "manages to encompass their musical identity" and that it's "always keeps you on your toes".

Hannah Zwick of Consequence of Sound said that the album "showcases their signature style of blending genres and influences to create songs that are just as classically pop as they are identifiably Blackpink", but critiques that it "leave[s] you wanting more, both in quantity and quality". In a more positive review, IZM wrote that the appearance of this work informs that K-pop has begun to be reborn from a "passive attitude" to a "subjective aspect" and believes that "a lot of things will change starting from this album".

In a mixed review from Slant Magazine, Sophie Ordez wrote that "crammed chockfull of crowd-pleasing EDM pyrotechnics and cheeky one-liners, The Album is undeniably a product of a well-oiled, state-of-the-art pop machine, but it feels stuck looking back to tried and true trends in both K-pop and Western pop music." Mikael Wood from the Los Angeles Times gave a mixed review, calling the album "oppressive" and "almost entirely out of alignment with pop music's prevailing trends" and that the release "fails the test of old pop as well as the test of new." Sputnikmusic's Raul Stanciu rated the album 2.4 out of 5, pointing out: "There is roughly an EP worth of songs here that bring something remotely interesting to the table, rather than simply rehashing past ideas and reproducing beats you've heard in 100 other tracks before."

Billboard and Uproxx named it one of the best albums released in 2020. Its singles, "How You Like That", "Ice Cream" and "Lovesick Girls" were also named amongst best songs of 2020. Paste ranked it the 15th greatest K-pop album of all time in 2023, writing that "instead of just singing about love the quartet showcased their mature exploration of all of love's greatest complexities", calling the album a "stirring document of musical growth from one of K-pop's most important acts."

=== Critic lists ===
The Album on critic lists
Critic/Publication	List	Rank	Ref.
Billboard	Top 50 Best Albums of 2020	25	
Billboard	The 25 Best Pop Albums of 2020	—N/a	
Collider	The 10 Greatest K-Pop Albums of All Time, Ranked	10	
Dazed	The 20 Best Albums of 2020	15	
Genius	50 Best Albums of 2020	14	
Glamour	The 30 Best Albums of 2020	—N/a	
Idolator	The 70 Best Pop Albums Of 2020	23	
Paste	The 30 Greatest K-pop Albums of All Time	15	
PopCrush	25 Best Albums of 2020	—N/a	
Uproxx	The Best Albums of 2020	41	

== Awards and nominations ==
The album received nominations for Album of the Year at the 2020 Melon Music Awards and the 2020 Mnet Asian Music Awards; its single "How You Like That" won Best Female Dance Award at both. It was also nominated for Album of the Year at the 2021 Golden Disc Awards, where it won the Best Album Bonsang.

Awards and nominations for The Album
Year	Organization	Award	Result	Ref.
2020	Asian Pop Music Awards	Best Album (Overseas)	Won	
2020	Melon Music Awards	Album of the Year	Nominated	
2020	Mnet Asian Music Awards	Album of the Year	Nominated	
2021	Gaon Chart Music Awards	Artist of the Year – Physical Album (4th Quarter)	Nominated	
2021	Golden Disc Awards	Best Album (Bonsang)	Won	
2021	Golden Disc Awards	Album of the Year (Daesang)	Nominated	

== Commercial performance ==
On September 4, 2020, YG announced that The Album had surpassed 800,000 pre-orders just 6 days after the pre-order period started. According to the company, the number of pre-orders reached over 530,000 copies in South Korea and combined pre-orders from the United States and Europe amounted to around 270,000 units. By October 2, The Album had surpassed one million stock pre-orders. Of the one million, 670,000 pre-orders came from Korea and 340,000 came from the US and Europe. Additionally, a vinyl limited to 18,888 copies sold out within days. On October 26, 2020, it was reported that the album accumulated 1.2 million physical sales worldwide. In doing so, it broke S.E.S' 21-year-old record for the best-selling album by an idol girl group with their album Love, which had sold 760,000 copies in 1999. The Album debuted at the top spot of the Gaon Album Chart, and broke the record of first week sales on Hanteo among girl groups, with 590,000 copies sold in just one day after its physical release date. In November 2020, The Album debuted at number two on the Gaon Monthly album chart for the previous month, with 1,092,550 copies sold. On December 10, Gaon Chart announced that Blackpink's album received an official million certification after selling over a million copies in South Korea, the first album by a female act to do so.

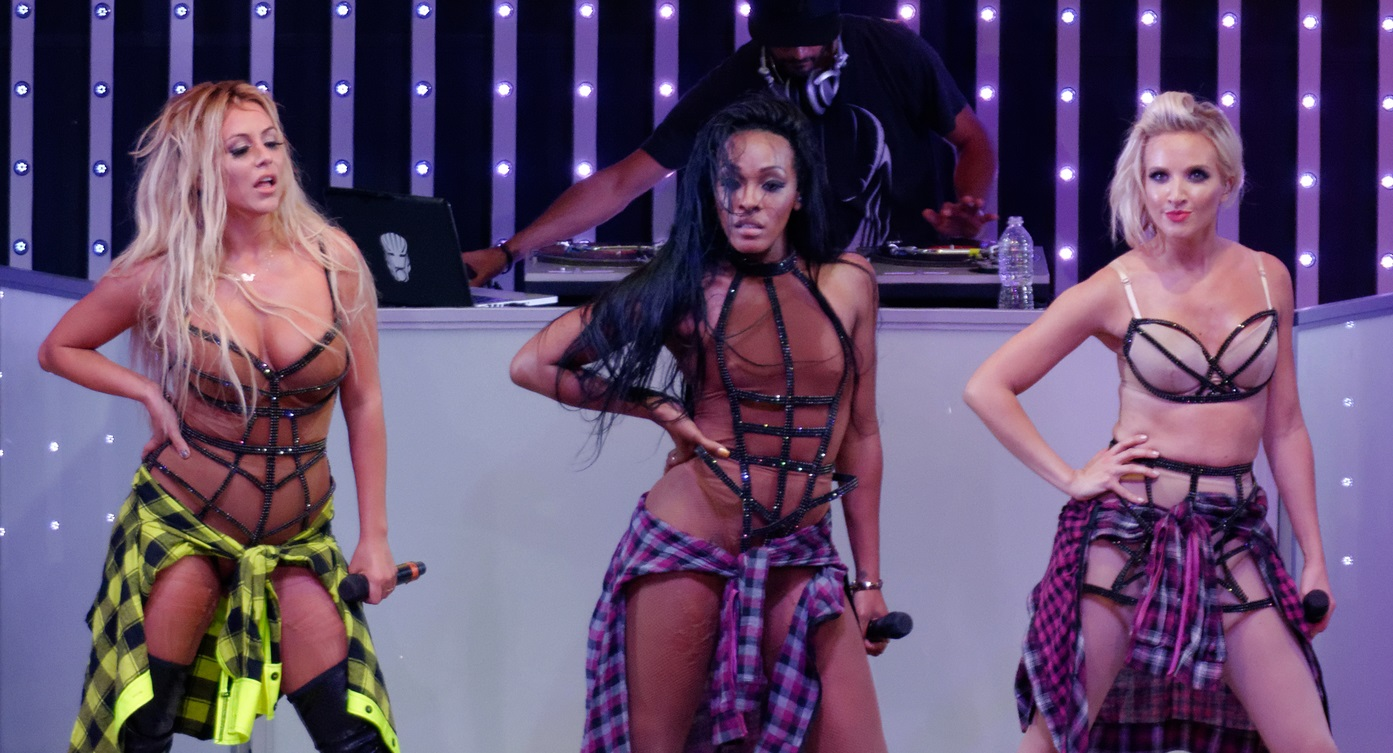
With The Album peaking at number two on the Billboard 200, Blackpink became the highest-charting album by a female group since Danity Kane in 2006.

In the United States, The Album debuted at number two on the US Billboard 200 dated October 11, 2020, with 110,000 album-equivalent units, including 81,000 pure album sales, 26,000 stream-equivalent sales (resulting from 40.3 million on-demand streams), and 2,000 track-equivalent sales. The album also became the highest-charting female Korean album and the highest-charting album by an all-female group since Danity Kane's Welcome to the Dollhouse in 2008. In the same week, Blackpink also topped the Billboard Artist 100 Chart, becoming the first girl group to do so. In its second week, the album descended to number six, with 35,000 equivalent album units earned, becoming the second K-pop act to spend multiple weeks in the top ten. In its third week in the top ten, the album sold 29,000 units. Following Blackpink's virtual concert "The Show", The Album rose from number 148 to 59 on the Billboard 200. The Album and its singles were noted for having better chart performances compared to Kill This Love and its title track. In Canada, The Album opened at number five on the Canadian Albums Chart. Five album tracks debuted on the Canadian Hot 100 chart, with "How You Like That", "Ice Cream" and "Lovesick Girls" arriving in the top 40.

The Album debuted at number two on the UK Albums Chart, becoming the highest-charting album by a Korean girl group and Korean female artist on the chart. It was also the best-selling cassette album of the week, shifting 5,700 copies on the format. In 2020, Blackpink charted five different songs in the United Kingdom in a single year, more than any other Korean act. By the end of the year, The Album was the country's fifth best-selling cassette record and among the ten biggest releases from a female artist. In Ireland, The Album arrived at number six on the Irish Albums Chart. The album reached the top ten in many other European territories, including Finland, Flanders, Germany, Hungary, Lithuania, Norway, Poland, Scotland, Slovakia, Spain and Sweden, and the top twenty in the Czech Republic, France, Italy, the Netherlands, Switzerland and Wallonia.

The Album was also successful in Oceania. In Australia, it debuted at number two on the ARIA Albums Chart. Moreover, "How You Like That", "Ice Cream", "Bet You Wanna" and "Lovesick Girls" entered the top 50 of the ARIA Singles Chart. The album debuted at number one on the New Zealand albums chart, becoming the first album by a female Korean act to top the chart and the first album by a female group to do so since The Pussycat Dolls's PCD in 2005. "Lovesick Girls", "Bet You Wanna", and "Pretty Savage" charted in the top 10 of the New Zealand Hot Singles chart, and "Crazy Over You" placed thirteenth.

The album's eight songs collectively drew 333.3 million streams and 70,000 downloads worldwide in the tracking week ending October 8, according to MRC Data. All songs debuted in the top 70 of Billboard Global 200 and the top 50 of the Global Excl. US, with five songs entering the top 20 of the latter. It was led by the album's title track "Lovesick Girls", which debuted at number two on the Global 200. Outside the U.S., it debuted at number one on the Global Excl. U.S. with 114 million streams and 17,000 downloads sold, becoming the first chart-topper by a female artist. According to the International Federation of the Phonographic Industry (IFPI), The Album was the fifth best-selling album worldwide in pure sales in 2020, marking Blackpink's first album to rank in the top ten.

== Track listing ==
The Album track listing
No.	Title	Lyrics	Music	Arrangement	Length
1.	"How You Like That"	Teddy; Danny Chung	Teddy; R. Tee; 24	R. Tee; 24	3:00
2.	"Ice Cream" (with Selena Gomez)	Bekuh Boom; Victoria Monét; Teddy	Tommy Brown; Steven Franks; Teddy; Boom; Monét; 24; Gomez; Ariana Grande	Brown; Mr. Franks; Teddy	2:55
3.	"Pretty Savage"	Teddy; Løren; Vince; Chung	Teddy; 24; R. Tee; Boom	Teddy; 24; R. Tee	3:19
4.	"Bet You Wanna" (featuring Cardi B)	Brown; Franks; Ryan Tedder; Melanie Fontana; Belcalis Almanzar; Torae Carr; Jonathan Descartes	Brown; Franks	Brown; Franks; Teddy	2:39
5.	"Lovesick Girls"	Teddy; Løren; Jisoo; Jennie; Chung	Teddy; 24; Jennie; Brian Lee; R. Tee; Leah Haywood; David Guetta	24; R. Tee	3:12
6.	"Crazy Over You"	Teddy; Boom; Chung	Teddy; Boom; 24; R. Tee; Future Bounce	24; R. Tee; Future Bounce	2:41
7.	"Love to Hate Me"	Tushar Apte; Rob Grimaldi; Chloe George; Steph Jones; Chung	Apte; Grimaldi; 24	Apte; Grimaldi; 24; Vince; Teddy	2:49
8.	"You Never Know"	Løren; Boom	24; Boom	24	3:49
Total length:					24:28

The Album – JP Ver. track listing
No.	Title	Lyrics	Music	Arrangement	Length
1.	"How You Like That" (JP ver.)	Teddy; Danny Chung; Co-sho	Teddy; R. Tee; 24	R. Tee; 24	3:00
3.	"Pretty Savage" (JP ver.)	Teddy; Løren; Vince; Chung; FanFan	Teddy; R. Tee; 24; Boom	Teddy; 24; R. Tee	3:19
5.	"Lovesick Girls" (JP ver.)	Teddy; Løren; Jisoo; Jennie; Chung; Co-sho	Teddy; 24; Jennie; Brian Lee; R. Tee; Leah Haywood; David Guetta	24; R. Tee	3:12
8.	"You Never Know" (JP ver.)	Løren; Boom; Sayumi Otomo	24; Boom	24	3:49
Total length:					24:28

== Personnel ==
Credits adapted from album liner notes and Tidal.

Musicians

- Blackpink – vocals
  - Jisoo — lyricist (track 5)
  - Jennie — lyricist, (track 5), composer (track 5)
- Teddy – lyricist (tracks 1–3, 5–6), composer (tracks 1–3, 5–6)
- Danny Chung – lyricist (tracks 1, 3, 5–7)
- Selena Gomez – featured artist, composer (track 2)
- Victoria Monét – composer, lyricist (track 2)
- Ariana Grande – composer (track 2)
- Bekuh Boom – lyricist (tracks 2, 6, 8), composer (tracks 2, 3, 6, 8)
- Løren – lyricist (track 3, 5, 8)
- Vince – lyricist (track 3)
- Cardi B – featured artist, lyricist (track 4)
- Ryan Tedder – lyricist (track 4)
- Steven Franks – lyricist (track 4)
- Melanie Fontana – lyricist (track 4)
- Torae Carr – lyricist (track 4)
- Jonathan Descartes – lyricist (track 4)
- Leah Haywood – composer (track 5)
- David Guetta – composer (track 5)
- Future Bounce – composer (track 6)
- Tushar Apte – composer, lyricist (track 7)
- Rob Grimaldi – composer, lyricist (track 7)
- Chloe George – lyricist (track 7)
- Steph Jones – lyricist (track 7)
- Co-sho – lyricist (tracks 1, 5) (Japanese version)
- FanFan – lyricist (track 3) (Japanese version)
- Sayumi Otomo – lyricist (track 8) (Japanese version)

Technical

- Teddy – arranger (tracks 2–4, 7), producer (tracks 1–3, 5–6)
- 24 – arranger (tracks 1, 3, 5–8), producer (tracks 1–3, 5–8)
- R. Tee – arranger (tracks 1, 3, 5–6), producer (tracks 1–3, 5–6)
- Steven Franks – arranger (track 2), producer (track 2)
- Tommy Brown – producer (tracks 2, 4)
- Future Bounce – arranger (track 6)
- Tushar Apte – arranger (track 7)
- Rob Grimaldi – arranger (track 7)
- Vince – arranger (track 7)
- Yong In Choi – recording engineer (all tracks)
- John Hanes — engineer (track 2)
- Jason Robert — mix engineer (tracks 3, 5–8)
- Serban Ghenea — mix engineer (tracks 2, 4)

Design

- Hyo Jin Jeong, Ji Hyun Park, Dami Hwang, Ji Yoon Kwon, Jin Ho Kang – design
- VB Studio – artwork
- Heejune Kim, Jungwook Mok – photographer
- Min Hee Park, Bal Ko Kim – stylist
- Seon Yeong Lee – hair
- Myung Sun Lee (Woosun) – make up
- Eunkyung Park (Unistella) – nail

Management

- YG Entertainment – executive producer
- Bo Young Yi, Min Kyeong Bae, Yea Deun Kim, Euna Ahn, Jiwan Seong, Jae Hyun Choe – A&R
- Yina Kim, Hana Kim, Seogyeong Shin, Gyeore Shin – artist strategy
- Kyung Hee Lee – chief media strategy officer
- Heon Pyo Park, Byoung Young Lee, Se Ho Kim, Eun Gon Kim, Ho Sup Shin, Jong Seong Park, Nam Gyu Kim, Sae Rom Lee, Dae Gun Lee – artist management
- Sung Jun Choi – chief operating officer
- Seon Young Kang, Yu Jin Jung, Eun Yu Choi – music business
- Bo Kyung Hwang – executive supervisor

== Charts ==
=== Weekly charts ===
2020–2021 weekly chart performance for The Album
Chart (2020–2021)	Peak position
Argentine Albums (CAPIF)	9
Australian Albums (ARIA)	2
Austrian Albums (Ö3 Austria)	9
Belgian Albums (Ultratop Flanders)	4
Belgian Albums (Ultratop Wallonia)	16
Canadian Albums (Billboard)	5
Croatian International Albums (HDU)	22
Czech Albums (ČNS IFPI)	11
Danish Albums (Hitlisten)	19
Dutch Albums (Album Top 100)	14
Finnish Albums (Suomen virallinen lista)	9
French Albums (SNEP)	11
German Albums (Offizielle Top 100)	7
Hungarian Albums (MAHASZ)	7
Icelandic Albums (Tónlistinn)	13
Irish Albums (Official Charts)	6
Italian Albums (FIMI)	17
Japanese Albums (Oricon)	4
Japanese Albums (Oricon) Japanese version	3
Japanese Hot Albums (Billboard Japan)	2
Lithuanian Albums (AGATA)	3
New Zealand Albums (RMNZ)	1
Norwegian Albums (VG-lista)	10
Polish Albums (ZPAV)	4
Portuguese Albums (AFP)	17
Scottish Albums (Official Charts)	3
Slovak Albums (ČNS IFPI)	9
South Korean Albums (Gaon)	1
South Korean Albums (Gaon) Limited Edition LP version	12
Spanish Albums (PROMUSICAE)	4
Swedish Albums (Sverigetopplistan)	8
Swiss Albums (Schweizer Hitparade)	11
UK Albums (Official Charts)	2
US Billboard 200	2
US World Albums (Billboard)	1

2025 weekly chart performance for The Album
Chart (2025)	Peak position
Greek Albums (IFPI)	51

=== Monthly charts ===
Monthly chart performance for The Album
Chart (2020)	Peak position
Japanese Albums (Oricon)	18
Japanese Albums (Oricon) Japanese version	9
South Korean Albums (Gaon)	2
South Korean Albums (Gaon) Limited Edition LP version	23

=== Year-end charts ===
2020 year-end chart performance for The Album
Chart (2020)	Position
Global Album Sales (IFPI)	5
Hungarian Albums (MAHASZ)	69
South Korean Albums (Gaon)	5
UK Cassette Albums (OCC)	5
US Billboard 200	189
US World Albums (Billboard)	4

2021 year-end chart performance for The Album
Chart (2021)	Position
Japan Hot Albums (Billboard Japan)	88
South Korean Albums (Gaon)	56
US Billboard 200	200
US World Albums (Billboard)	3

2022 year-end chart performance for The Album
Chart (2022)	Position
Polish Albums (ZPAV)	53

== Certifications and sales ==
Certifications and sales for The Album
Region	Certification	Certified units/sales
Canada (Music Canada)	Gold	40,000^{‡}
France (SNEP)	Gold	50,000^{‡}
Italy (FIMI)	Gold	25,000^{‡}
Japan	—	66,862
New Zealand (RMNZ)	Gold	7,500^{‡}
Poland (ZPAV)	Platinum	20,000^{‡}
South Korea (KMCA)	Million	1,809,795
United Kingdom (BPI)	Gold	100,000^{‡}
United States	—	117,000
Summaries
Worldwide (IFPI)	—	1,510,000
^{‡} Sales+streaming figures based on certification alone.

== Release history ==
Release dates and formats for The Album
Region	Date	Edition	Format(s)	Label(s)	Ref.
Various	October 2, 2020	Korean	Digital download; streaming	YG; Interscope	
United States	October 2, 2020	Korean	CD	YG; Interscope	
Brazil	October 2, 2020	Korean	CD	YG; Interscope	
Australia	October 2, 2020	Korean	CD	YG; Interscope	
Germany	October 2, 2020	Korean	CD	YG; Interscope	
France	October 2, 2020	Korean	CD	YG; Interscope	
United Kingdom	October 2, 2020	Korean	CD; cassette	YG; Interscope	
South Korea	October 6, 2020	Korean	CD; vinyl LP (Black Edition)	YG; Interscope	
Japan	October 6, 2020	Korean	CD	YG; Interscope	
United States	October 14, 2020	Korean	Cassette	YG; Interscope	
United States	December 31, 2020	Korean	Vinyl LP (Pink Edition)	YG; Interscope	
Japan	August 3, 2021	Japanese	Digital download; streaming	Universal Japan	
Japan	August 3, 2021	Japanese	CD	Universal Japan	
Japan	August 3, 2021	Japanese	CD+Blu-ray; CD+DVD	Universal Japan	
Japan	August 3, 2021	Japanese	CD+DVD; CD+Photobook	Universal Japan	
Japan	August 3, 2021	Japanese	CD+2Blu-ray; CD+2DVD	Universal Japan	

== See also ==
- List of best-selling albums in China
- List of best-selling albums in South Korea
- List of best-selling girl group albums
- List of certified albums in South Korea
- List of Gaon Album Chart number ones of 2020
- List of K-pop albums on the Billboard charts
- List of K-pop on the Billboard year-end charts
- List of number-one albums from the 2020s (New Zealand)
- List of top 10 albums for 2020 in Australia
- List of UK top-ten albums in 2020
