= You Never Know (Blackpink song) =

2020 song by Blackpink

Song by Blackpink

from the album The Album
- Language: Korean; English
- Released: October 2, 2020
- Studio: The Black Label (Seoul)
- Genre: Pop
- Length: 3:49
- Label: YG; Interscope
- Composers: 24; Bekuh Boom
- Lyricists: Løren; Bekuh Boom

Audio video
- "You Never Know" on YouTube

"You Never Know" is a song recorded by South Korean girl group Blackpink from their debut studio album The Album. It was released on October 2, 2020, through YG and Interscope. The track's lyrics were written by Løren and Bekuh Boom, with composition handled by 24 and Boom. "You Never Know" is a pop ballad that features the group's stripped vocals, minimalist arrangement and instrumentation provided by a piano and orchestral violin. Lyrically, the song deals with being judged by others.

"You Never Know" peaked at number 64 on the Billboard Global 200, number four on the US World Digital Song Sales chart, and was a top-ten hit in Malaysia and Singapore. The song was certified gold by Pro-Música Brasil.

== Promotion and release ==
Blackpink performing a medley of "You Never Know" and "Love to Hate Me" at their first virtual concert, The Show.

On July 28, 2020 the group revealed that their debut record would be titled The Album and that it would be released on October 2, 2020. "You Never Know" was announced as the eight track of The Album on September 28, 2020, through the group's official social media accounts. On January 31, 2021 the group performed the song alongside "Love to Hate Me" at their first virtual concert, The Show. A Japanese version of the track was released on August 3, 2021.

== Lyrics and production ==
The lyrics of the song were written by Bekuh Boom and Løren. During an interview with NME, Løren described working with Blackpink as a "particularly special moment". He wrote the lyrics of the song based on the group's "experiences and struggles about being in the public eye". The writer revealed that he would sit down with them and listen to their "personal thoughts". He furthermore explained: "it was great taking something that isn’t as personal to me and then using it to make music, because my creations are usually very personal. It was almost like working with a different kind of material". The final version of "You Never Know" was recorded by Blackpink at The Black Label in Seoul, South Korea.

"You Never Know" is a "heartfelt" pop ballad with minimalist arrangement and its instrumentation being provided by a piano and orchestral violin. It features the group's "stripped vocals" and "a sense of triumph". Thematically, the track is about patience and empathy. The song's "sensitive" lyrics deal with sadness and inadequacy alongside being judged by others. Its chorus talk about "the danger of only knowing second-hand information": "But you’ll never know unless you walk in my shoes/ Cause everybody sees what they wanna see/ It’s easier to judge me than to believe". The song is composed in the key of F major, with a fast tempo of 144 beats per minute, and runs for 3 minutes and 49 seconds.

== Critical reception ==
The song was met with favorable reviews from critics. Writing for Billboard, Jason Lipshutz ranked "You Never Know" as the third best song on the album, calling it a "heartfelt balladry". Writing for the Young Post, Candace Kwan noted that the song's production allows "the girls’ vocals to shine". Sophia Ordaz of Slant Magazine stated that the track "sees Rosé, Jisoo, Lisa, and Jennie grappling with feelings of sadness and inadequacy". Hunter Church of The Young Folks named the track an "effective emotional closer" and "very unique in the context of the entire project" as it "manages to slow the pace down in preparation for the end of the record".

Callie Ahlgrim from Insider called the song an "underwhelming farewell". Writing for the same article, Palmer Haasch noted that the song shows "the members' individual vocal colors". Inyoung Choi deemed the track a good album closer after "an album that gives off so much energy". Raul Stanciu described "You Never Know" as an "obligatory ballad that doesn’t do much to lift the record in any way".

== Credits and personnel ==
Credits adapted from the liner notes of The Album and The Album – JP Ver.

Recording

- Recorded at The Black Label Studio (Seoul)
- Mixed at The Lab (Los Angeles) and MixStar Studios (Virginia Beach, Virginia)
- Mastered at Sterling Sound (New York City)

Personnel

- Blackpink – vocals
- Løren – lyricist
- Bekuh Boom – lyricist, composer
- Sayumi Otomo – lyricist (Japanese version)
- 24 – composer, arranger
- Yong In Choi – recording engineer
- Jason Robert – mixing engineer
- Serban Ghenea – mixing engineer
- Randy Merrill – mastering engineer

== Charts ==
Weekly chart performance for "You Never Know"
Chart (2020)	Peak position
Global 200 (Billboard)	64
Hong Kong (HKRIA)	22
Malaysia (RIM)	5
Portugal (AFP)	111
Singapore (RIAS)	7
South Korea (Circle)	101
South Korea (K-pop Hot 100)	51
US World Digital Song Sales (Billboard)	4

== Certifications ==
Certifications for "You Never Know"
Region	Certification	Certified units/sales
Brazil (Pro-Música Brasil)	Gold	20,000^{‡}
^{‡} Sales+streaming figures based on certification alone.

== See also ==
- List of K-pop songs on the Billboard charts
