= Ice Cream (Blackpink and Selena Gomez song) =

Single by Blackpink and Selena Gomez

from the album The Album
- Language: English; Korean
- Released: August 28, 2020
- Studio: The Black Label (Seoul)
- Genre: Electropop; bubblegum pop
- Length: 2:56
- Label: YG; Interscope
- Composers: Tommy Brown; Mr. Franks; Teddy; Bekuh Boom; Victoria Monét; 24; Selena Gomez; Ariana Grande
- Lyricists: Bekuh Boom; Victoria Monét; Teddy

Blackpink singles chronology
"How You Like That" (2020)	"Ice Cream" (2020)	"Lovesick Girls" (2020)

Selena Gomez singles chronology
"Past Life" (2020)	"Ice Cream" (2020)	"Baila Conmigo" (2021)

Music video
- "Ice Cream" on YouTube

"Ice Cream" is a song by the South Korean girl group Blackpink and American singer Selena Gomez. It was released on August 28, 2020, through YG Entertainment and Interscope Records, as the second single from the group's debut studio album, The Album (2020). The song was composed by Gomez with Tommy Brown, Mr. Franks, Teddy, Bekuh Boom, Victoria Monét, 24, and Ariana Grande, while its lyrics were penned by Boom, Monét, and Teddy. "Ice Cream" is an electropop and bubblegum pop song with elements of trap. Lyrically, the song mainly consists of ice cream-related double entendres.

"Ice Cream" received critical acclaim and appeared on numerous rankings for the best songs of the year, including lists by Billboard, Rolling Stone, and The Associated Press. The song peaked at number 13 on the US Billboard Hot 100, becoming the first single by a female Korean act to enter the top twenty of the chart and subsequently becoming the longest-charting song by a female Korean act on the Hot 100. Elsewhere, the song peaked within the top ten on both the Billboard Global 200 and Global Excl. U.S., as well as charts in South Korea, El Salvador, Hungary, Malaysia and Singapore. It also has figured within the record charts in other 22 countries. The song was certified platinum in Australia and Canada, gold in Japan and New Zealand, and silver in the United Kingdom.

An accompanying music video for the song features Blackpink and Selena Gomez in a number of colorful sets themed around ice cream and was filmed in South Korea and the United States. It garnered 79.08 million views in its first 24 hours and became the third biggest 24-hour debut for a music video at the time. The song received several accolades such as nominations for Best Collaboration at the MTV Europe Music Awards, Music Video of 2020 at the People's Choice Awards, and Best K-Pop at the MTV Video Music Awards.

== Background and release ==
In an interview for Radio.com, Gomez revealed that she was first introduced to Blackpink after meeting Jisoo and Rosé during New York Fashion Week in 2018, while Blackpink shared that they had been big fans of Gomez's growing up, having danced to her music as trainees.

On July 23, 2020, YG Entertainment released a teaser poster for a new collaboration single between Blackpink and an unnamed artist, set to be released in August. Fans on social media started the "#AriPink" hashtag in hopes that the collaboration would be with singer Ariana Grande. On July 28, the band announced their first Korean studio album, The Album, would be released on October 2, 2020. On August 11, 2020, the unnamed artist was revealed to be American singer Selena Gomez, with Grande later being confirmed as one of the songwriters. Ten days later, it was revealed that the title of the collaboration would be "Ice Cream". On August 24, a teaser video featuring Blackpink and Gomez on video call together while the song played in the background was released. Teaser photos of Blackpink and Gomez were released from August 24 to August 26. The teaser photo of Blackpink member Jisoo was released on August 24, photos of members Jennie and Rosé were released on August 25, and photos of Lisa as well as Gomez were released on August 26. On August 27, 2020, Blackpink released a music video teaser for "Ice Cream".

Upon the song's release, Gomez released an ice cream flavor inspired by the collaboration with Blackpink with Serendipity Ice Cream, in which she has an ownership stake, called "Cookies and Cream Remix".

== Composition ==
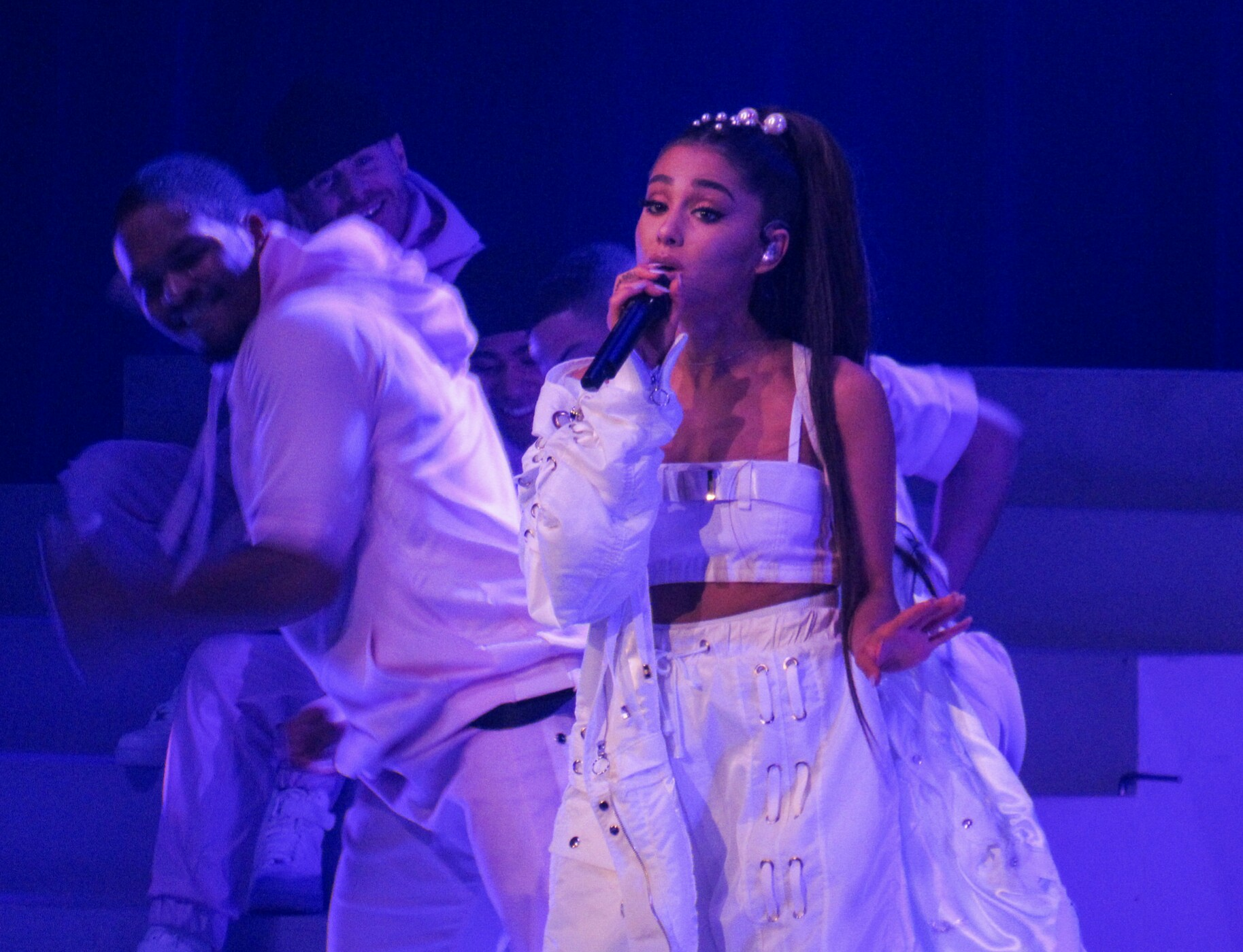
Ariana Grande (pictured in 2017) co-composed "Ice Cream"

"Ice Cream" is an electropop and bubblegum pop song with elements of trap-pop. The song is written in the key of E major with a tempo of 80 beats per minute, while Blackpink's and Gomez's vocals range from the low note of B_{3} to the high note of E_{5}. The song's lyrics are sung mostly in English, with the exception of a Korean rap verse from Lisa. Lyrically, the song mainly consists of ice cream-related double entendres. Jon Caramanica of The New York Times described "Ice Cream" as "relentlessly bouncy and chipper" and described the singing as "a little playful, a little taunting, a little distant".

== Music video ==
=== Development and release ===
On August 27, 2020, Blackpink released an 18-second long teaser clip of the music video for "Ice Cream"; the music video was released a day later on August 28. Both videos were released on the group's official YouTube channel. The music video for "Ice Cream" was directed by frequent director and collaborator Seo Hyun-seung. Behind-the-scenes videos of filming were released separately by Blackpink and Gomez on August 29. Blackpink's scenes were filmed in South Korea, while the scenes featuring Gomez were filmed separately in the United States due to the COVID-19 pandemic.

Upon release, the music video debuted at number one on the Global YouTube Music Videos Chart. It garnered 79.08 million views in its first 24 hours, making it the third biggest 24-hour debut for a music video on the platform at the time, and a second personal best for the group behind their June 2020 single "How You Like That", which received 86.3 million views in its first 24 hours. On April 15, 2026, the music video surpassed one billion views, becoming Blackpink's eighth video and Gomez's fourth video to reach the milestone.

=== Synopsis ===
A scene in the music video where Blackpink appears in a bright pink ice cream parlor, holding ice cream and wearing black-and-white outfits.

The music video shows Gomez and Blackpink in a number of colorful sets and outfits. It opens with Gomez in a candy-striped bikini with gold hoop earrings and a white sailor hat, driving a pastel-colored ice cream truck filled with Serendipity Ice Cream. The ice cream truck has the word "Selpink" written on it, a combination of "Selena" and "Blackpink". The members of Blackpink appear next on-screen, popping up smiling behind ice-cream shaped cardboard cutouts. During her first verse, Jennie appears in a blue Care Bears-printed dress, wearing matching blue eyeliner; later in the video, she is joined by a capybara. Blackpink are then shown riding bikes and dancing in a colorful, Candy Land-like cul-de-sac, while Gomez stands outside of the ice cream truck wearing a Puma romper with a green visor. Gomez appears in a polka-dot yellow top with blue culottes for her next verse, standing in front of a wall which reads "Ice Queen" in graffiti. Rosé then appears alongside a Golden Retriever. Next, Jisoo walks out of a cherry-patterned car parked in a cherry-patterned garage, holding a cherry and wearing cherry-themed accessories with a diadem. For the second chorus, Blackpink dance in a pastel pink tennis court, holding tennis rackets and wearing white tennis skirts and crop tops, while Selena is shown sitting in a Chevrolet, sporting a 1950s pin-up-inspired updo and wearing a yellow plaid off-the-shoulder romper. Blackpink appear in a bright pink ice cream parlor for the second post-chorus, holding ice cream and wearing black-and-white outfits. Blackpink are shown dancing and holding cat ice cream pillows during Lisa's rap verse. As the song closes, Blackpink drive around in metallic pink Mercedes-Benz Power Wheels cars and, in a separate scene, play on a blow-up slide, wearing crochet outfits.

=== Performance video ===
On September 2, an animated dance performance version of the music video was released via the group's YouTube channel. In it, Blackpink and Gomez appear as 3-D Zepeto avatars dressed in outfits similar to those worn in the original music video, and virtually team up to perform a dance routine to the song, that also included parts of the original choreography, while surrounded by "suspended ice cream cones" and other related imagery. The video gained over 142 million views as of December 2023.

== Accolades ==
"Ice Cream" on year-end lists
Critic/Publication	List	Rank	Ref.
Billboard	The 100 Best Songs of 2020	74	
Rolling Stone	The 50 Best Songs of 2020	13	
Rolling Stone	The Best Pop Collaborations of 2020	—N/a	
Rolling Stone	Rob Sheffield's Top 25 Songs of 2020	19	
Rolling Stone	Best K-Pop video of 2020	—N/a	
The Associated Press	The Top 10 Songs of the Year	10	
Elite Daily	The 10 Most Jaw-dropping Music Videos of 2020	9	
Pitchfork	Pitchfork Reader's 100 Best Songs of 2020	84	
The Guardian	Albums and Tracks of 2020	—N/a	
Idolator	The 25 Most Underrated Pop Songs Of 2020	19	
Idolator	The 25 Best Music Videos of 2020	9	
Insider	The 34 Best Music Videos of 2020	16	
Stereogum	The Top 40 Pop Songs of 2020	9	

Awards and nominations for "Ice Cream"
Year	Organization	Award	Result	Ref.
2020	Clio Awards	Music Marketing – Partnerships & Collaborations	Silver	
2020	Capricho Awards	Feature of the Year	Nominated	
2020	MTV Europe Music Awards	Best Collaboration	Nominated	
2020	People's Choice Awards	Music Video of 2020	Nominated	
2021	Circle Chart Music Awards	Artist of the Year – Digital Music (August)	Nominated	
2021	Joox Indonesia Music Awards	Global Song of the Year	Nominated	
2021	Nickelodeon Kids' Choice Awards	Favorite Music Collaboration	Nominated	
2021	MTV Video Music Awards	Best K-Pop	Nominated	
2021	Weibo Starlight Awards	Favorite Collaboration	Won	

Music program awards
Program	Date	Ref.
Inkigayo	September 20, 2020	
Inkigayo	September 27, 2020	
Inkigayo	October 4, 2020	

== Commercial performance ==
In the United States, the song debuted at number 13 on the Billboard Hot 100, surpassing "How You Like That" and "Sour Candy", both of which peaked at number 33, to become Blackpink's highest-charting single in the country. The song also debuted at number two on Billboard's Digital Songs chart and at number eight on Billboard's Streaming Songs chart, having sold over 23,000 digital copies and having received over 18.3 million streams in its first week of tracking. It also appeared at number 32 on the Billboard Mainstream Top 40 chart after garnering substantial airplay on both contemporary and adult contemporary radio, gaining 5.1 million radio airplay audience impressions during its first week of tracking and marking Blackpink's debut on the chart. The song became the longest-charting song by an all-female Korean act on the Hot 100, after spending eight consecutive weeks on the chart, surpassing their own previous record of four weeks set by "Kill This Love". The song became Gomez's 20th and Blackpink's third top 40 hit in the US. By the end of 2020, the song had reached 126,500,000 streams in the US.

In South Korea, "Ice Cream" debuted at number 51 on the Gaon Digital Chart issue dated August 23–29 with less than two days of tracking. On the next chart issue dated August 30-September 5, the song rose to its peak at number 8. In the United Kingdom, the song debuted at number 39, making Blackpink the first Korean act to achieve five top 40 singles in the country. The song charted in the UK for eight weeks and became the second-longest charting single by a Korean girl group behind Blackpink and Dua Lipa's "Kiss and Make Up". "Ice Cream" also debuted at number eight on the Billboard Global 200 and number six on the Global Excl. U.S. upon the launch of the charts on September 19. The song stayed in the top ten for a second week at number nine on the Global Excl. U.S. on the chart issue dated September 26. In total, "Ice Cream" charted on the Global 200 for 14 weeks and on the Global Excl. U.S. for 22 weeks.

== Credits and personnel ==
Credits adapted from the liner notes of The Album.

Recording

- Recorded at The Black Label Studio (Seoul)
- Mixed at The Lab (Los Angeles) and MixStar Studios (Virginia Beach, Virginia)
- Mastered at Sterling Sound (New York City)

Personnel

- Blackpink – vocals
- Selena Gomez – vocals, composer
- Bekuh Boom – lyricist, composer
- Victoria Monét – lyricist, composer
- Teddy – lyricist, composer
- Tommy Brown – lyricist, composer, arranger
- Mr. Franks – composer, arranger
- 24 – composer, arranger
- Ariana Grande – composer
- Yong In Choi – recording engineer
- Jason Robert – mixing engineer
- Serban Ghenea – mixing engineer
- Randy Merrill – mastering engineer

== Charts ==
=== Weekly charts ===
Weekly chart performance
Chart (2020)	Peak position
Argentina Hot 100 (Billboard)	41
Australia (ARIA)	16
Austria (Ö3 Austria Top 40)	57
Belgium (Ultratip Bubbling Under Flanders)	28
Canada Hot 100 (Billboard)	11
Canada CHR/Top 40 (Billboard)	24
Czech Republic Singles Digital (ČNS IFPI)	60
El Salvador (Monitor Latino)	9
Euro Digital Songs (Billboard)	11
France (SNEP)	135
Germany (GfK)	78
Germany Airplay (BVMI)	86
Global 200 (Billboard)	8
Greece International (IFPI)	28
Hungary (Single Top 40)	6
Hungary (Stream Top 40)	31
Ireland (IRMA)	33
Japan Hot 100 (Billboard)	22
Japan Combined Singles (Oricon)	30
Lithuania (AGATA)	36
Malaysia (RIM)	2
Mexico Airplay (Billboard)	20
Mexico Ingles Airplay (Billboard)	8
Netherlands (Single Tip)	4
Netherlands (Tipparade)	16
Netherlands (Global Top 40)	5
New Zealand (Recorded Music NZ)	18
Paraguay (SGP)	35
Portugal (AFP)	25
Romania (Airplay 100)	71
Scottish Singles Sales (Official Charts)	20
Singapore (RIAS)	2
Slovakia Singles Digital (ČNS IFPI)	38
South Korea (Gaon)	8
South Korea (K-pop Hot 100)	2
Spain (PROMUSICAE)	90
Sweden (Sverigetopplistan)	78
Switzerland (Schweizer Hitparade)	45
UK Singles (Official Charts)	39
US Billboard Hot 100	13
US Pop Airplay (Billboard)	21

=== Monthly charts ===
Monthly chart performance
Chart (2020)	Peak position
South Korea (Gaon)	15

=== Year-end charts ===
Year-end chart performance
Chart (2020)	Position
South Korea (Gaon)	139

== Certifications ==
Certifications
Region	Certification	Certified units/sales
Australia (ARIA)	Platinum	70,000^{‡}
Brazil (Pro-Música Brasil)	Diamond	160,000^{‡}
Canada (Music Canada)	Platinum	80,000^{‡}
New Zealand (RMNZ)	Gold	15,000^{‡}
Norway (IFPI Norway)	Gold	30,000^{‡}
United Kingdom (BPI)	Silver	200,000^{‡}
Streaming
Japan (RIAJ)	Gold	50,000,000^{†}
^{‡} Sales+streaming figures based on certification alone.^{†} Streaming-only figures based on certification alone.

== Release history ==
Release dates and formats
Region	Date	Format	Label	Ref.
Various	August 28, 2020	Digital download; streaming	YG; Interscope	
Australia	August 28, 2020	Contemporary hit radio	YG	
United States	September 1, 2020	Contemporary hit radio	YG; Interscope	

== See also ==
- List of best-selling girl group singles
- List of Billboard Global 200 top-ten singles in 2020
- List of Inkigayo Chart winners (2020)
- List of K-pop songs on the Billboard charts
- List of most-liked YouTube videos
