= List of Billboard Global 200 top-ten singles in 2020 =

This is a list of singles that charted in the top ten of the Billboard Global 200, an all-genre singles chart, in 2020. The chart officially premiered on Billboard's website on September 15, 2020, for the chart week dated September 19, 2020, so only songs from the September 19, 2020 chart onward are listed.

== Top-ten singles ==
Key

- ↑ – indicates single's top 10 entry was also its Global 200 debut

List of Billboard Global 200 top ten singles that peaked in 2020
Top ten entry date	Single	Artist(s)	Peak	Peak date	Weeks in top ten	Ref.
Singles from 2020
September 19	"WAP"	Cardi B featuring Megan Thee Stallion	1	September 19	11	
September 19	"Dynamite"	BTS	1	October 3	26	
September 19	"Mood"	24kGoldn featuring Iann Dior	2	October 24	25	
September 19	"Hawai"^{[C]}	Maluma^{2}	3	November 21	11	
September 19	"Laugh Now Cry Later"	Drake featuring Lil Durk	5	September 19	3	
September 19	"Savage Love (Laxed – Siren Beat)"	Jawsh 685 and Jason Derulo^{1}	1	October 17	8	
September 19	"Ice Cream"	Blackpink and Selena Gomez	8	September 19	1	
September 19	"Rockstar"	DaBaby featuring Roddy Ricch	8	September 26	2	
September 19	"Watermelon Sugar"	Harry Styles	9	September 26	2	
September 26	"For the Night"^{[A]}	Pop Smoke featuring Lil Baby and DaBaby	7	October 24	5	
October 3	"Holy"^{[D]} ↑	Justin Bieber featuring Chance the Rapper	3	October 3	7	
October 3	"Lemonade"	Internet Money and Gunna featuring Don Toliver and Nav	4	October 10	10	
October 10	"Franchise" ↑	Travis Scott featuring Young Thug and M.I.A.	7	October 10	1	
October 17	"Lovesick Girls" ↑	Blackpink	2	October 17	1	
October 17	"Runnin" ↑	21 Savage and Metro Boomin	9	October 17	1	
October 17	"Mr. Right Now" ↑	21 Savage and Metro Boomin featuring Drake	10	October 17	1	
October 24	"Dreams"	Fleetwood Mac	10	October 24	1	
October 31	"Lonely" ↑	Justin Bieber and Benny Blanco	5	October 31	5	
October 31	"Homura"	LiSA	8	October 31	1	
November 7	"Positions" ↑	Ariana Grande	1	November 7	10	
November 7	"Forever After All" ↑	Luke Combs	4	November 7	1	
November 14	"Dakiti" ↑	Bad Bunny and Jhay Cortez	1	November 21	18	
November 28	"Therefore I Am"	Billie Eilish	2	November 28	3	
December 5	"Life Goes On" ↑	BTS	1	December 5	1	
December 5	"Monster" ↑	Shawn Mendes and Justin Bieber	4	December 5	1	
December 5	"Blue & Grey" ↑	BTS	9	December 5	1	
December 12	"La Noche de Anoche" ↑	Bad Bunny and Rosalía	7	December 12	1	
December 26	"Willow" ↑	Taylor Swift	2	December 12	1	

=== 2021 peaks ===
List of Billboard Global 200 top ten singles in 2020 that peaked in 2021
Top ten entry date	Single	Artist(s)	Peak	Peak date	Weeks in top ten	Ref.
September 19	"Blinding Lights"^{[A]}^{[B]}^{[E]}	The Weeknd	2	January 23	26	
November 14	"34+35" ↑	Ariana Grande^{3}	2	January 30	8	

=== Holiday season ===
Holiday titles first making the Billboard Global 200 top ten during the 2020–21 holiday season
Top ten entry date	Single	Artist(s)	Peak	Peak date	Weeks in top ten	Ref.
December 12, 2020	"All I Want for Christmas Is You"	Mariah Carey	1	December 19, 2020	33	
December 12, 2020	"Last Christmas"	Wham!	1	December 20, 2025	30	
December 12, 2020	"Rockin' Around the Christmas Tree"	Brenda Lee	2	December 24, 2022	27	
December 19, 2020	"Jingle Bell Rock"	Bobby Helms	4	January 2, 2021	26	
December 19, 2020	"It's Beginning to Look a Lot Like Christmas"	Michael Buble	6	January 2, 2021	14	
December 26, 2020	"Santa Tell Me"	Ariana Grande	5	January 2, 2021	20	

== Notes ==
^{1} BTS was a credited act on "Savage Love (Laxed – Siren Beat)" for the week ending October 17, 2020, when the song reached number one, as remixes of the song figured into the song's chart points. As of the chart dated October 24, 2020, BTS is no longer credited.
^{2} The Weeknd was a credited act on "Hawai" for the week ending November 21, 2020, when the song reached its peak position of number 3, as remixes of the song figured into the song's chart points. As of the chart dated November 28, 2020, The Weeknd is no longer credited.
^{3} A remix of Ariana Grande's "34+35" that features Doja Cat and Megan Thee Stallion helped to bring the song back into the top ten, to its peak position of number 2, on January 30, 2021, and all three artists were credited on the song that week.

^{A} The single re-entered the top ten on the week ending October 24, 2020.
^{B} The single re-entered the top ten on the week ending November 7, 2020.
^{C} The single re-entered the top ten on the week ending November 14, 2020.
^{D} The single re-entered the top ten on the week ending November 21, 2020.
^{E} The single re-entered the top ten on the week ending December 12, 2020.
