= Kwon Ji Yong =

EP by G-Dragon
- Released: June 8, 2017
- Recorded: 2014–2017
- Genre: R&B; hip hop
- Length: 17:55
- Language: Korean
- Label: YG
- Producer: G-Dragon; Teddy; Choice37; Seonwoo Jeonga; Kush; Joe Rhee; 24; Future Bounce; 8!; Seo Won-Jin; Brian Lee; Frank Dukes; Cawlr; Murda Beatz; Safe

G-Dragon chronology
Coup d'Etat + One of a Kind & Heartbreaker (2013)	Kwon Ji Yong (2017)	Übermensch (2025)

Physical edition cover

Singles from Kwon Ji Yong
- 1. "Untitled, 2014" Released: June 8, 2017

Kwon Ji Yong (Korean: 권지용) is the second extended play (EP) by South Korean rapper G-Dragon, released digitally on June 8, 2017 by YG Entertainment. The EP was his first release in four years, following his second studio album Coup d'Etat (2013). The physical release was made on a USB flash drive in lieu of a traditional compact disc. The EP was generally well-received by critics who praised G-Dragon's honesty and vulnerability on the EP. This was G-Dragon's final release before his military enlistment on February 27, 2018, as well as before his departure from YG in 2023.

The EP debuted atop the US Billboard World Albums and Heatseekers Albums, and also topped the Billboard Hot Albums in Japan. The EP was a commercial success in mainland China, where it sold one million digital copies in less than a week, and was the best-selling digital album of 2017 by a Korean artist. To promote the record, G-Dragon embarked on his Act III: M.O.T.T.E World Tour just two days after its release.

== Background ==
Following the release of his second album Coup d'Etat (2013), G-Dragon ventured outside of music, pursuing his interests in fashion, art, and design. This culminated in the launch of his arthouse brand, Peaceminusone in 2015 beginning with an art exhibition of the same name. In 2014, G-Dragon began writing songs for Big Bang's album Made (2016) but suffered "writer's block", which delayed the release of the album. Made eventually became the group's most commercially successful album to date, and its supporting tour set a new record in concert attendance for Korean artists in Asia, North America, and Oceania. G-Dragon spent the majority of 2015 and 2016 on tour, and celebrated his band's tenth anniversary, with activities for the full Made album finally wrapping up in December 2016.

In January 2017, his label confirmed he would be releasing new music in the first half of the year. After spending two years on tour, G-Dragon revealed he felt lonely every day. Nevertheless, he acknowledged that "I'm loved wherever I go and I enjoy my work", confessing he feels a "mixture of happiness, sadness and loneliness". For six months preceding the release of the record, G-Dragon devoted himself to preparations for the album and his 2017 world tour, a process during which he did not sleep well and lost a lot of weight. On his fourth record, the rapper announced he wanted to distance himself from his stage persona, stating "I wanted to remember Kwon Ji Yong, not G-Dragon. To me, Kwon Ji Yong is more important, so I decided to officially introduce him to audiences." G-Dragon had originally named the EP 30, stating he wanted to look back on his life at 30 years old and feel he had achieved something meaningful.

== Composition ==
=== Lyrics and themes ===
"I approached [this record] a bit differently. There are so many things I don't know about myself. So I spent time looking over my past albums and thinking about my life. I've turned 30 this year [Korean age] and am going through an important phase in life. Instead of trying to create a trendy new look and sound, I worked on this album as if it were my last."

— G-Dragon on how Kwon Ji Yong differs from his previous work

In "Middle Fingers Up", G-Dragon discusses the diminishing number of his personal relationships and his ever-decreasing social circle. "Bullshit"'s lyrics are self-referential, referencing his hit-single "Crayon" by name while the canine onomatopoeia recalls the title track of his previous album Coup d'Etat. "Super Star" reveals his inner feelings of hollowness and emptiness, despite the musician achieving the success he previously dreamed of. The lyrics of "Untitled, 2014" reads like a letter to a past lover, with G-Dragon asking for forgiveness and the chance to see them again, even if it is just in his dreams. "Divina Commedia", titled after Dante's poem of the same name, is a semi-autobiographical account of his rise to fame. The song includes references to The Truman Show with the rapper questioning reality, and sacrifices he made during adolescence through to his twenties to attain success and notoriety.

The inspiration behind the record originated from multiple mediums, notably film and visual art. The visual concept of the record was inspired by the 1966 film adaptation of Kōbō Abe's novel, The Face of Another. His personal collection of art, which includes the $3.3 million USD painting, Millionaire Nurse (2002) by American artist Richard Prince, inspired the lyrics of "Super Star" and "Divina Commedia". The latter also directly references Peter Weir's satirical science fiction film The Truman Show (1998). G-Dragon credits Dante Alighieri's three-part epic poem Divine Comedy as the work which most poignantly inspired this album. The poem influenced the record in its theme and structure, and both the EP and subsequent tour was divided into three acts, each exploring one dimension of his personality.

=== Music ===
Kwon Ji Yong predominantly features songs under the hip hop and R&B genre, with the exception of its lead single, "Untitled, 2014", which is a ballad. The intro, "Middle Fingers-Up", features a piano riff with an underlying trap beat. Act I. or "Bullshit" is a multi-layered hip hop track characterized by a pulsating chorus and sudden beat and rhythm changes. Act II. or "Super Star" is a slow jam fused with trap, filled with brassy drums, Middle-Eastern horns, lilting synths, and a backing chorus. Act III. or "Untitled, 2014" is a melancholic ballad, featuring only bare vocals over piano accompaniment. The outro, "Divina Commedia", is an experimental alt-R&B track that samples "Veridis Quo" from Daft Punk's 2001 album Discovery.

== Packaging ==
The EP's physical release was made on a USB flash drive, rather than a compact disc. The 4GB flash drive is inscribed with "Kwon Ji Yong, Blood type A, 1988, August 18", the print being handwritten by G-Dragon's mother when he was born. After complaints that the USB was defective due to its red coating rubbing off, the artist's label released pictures of the production process, showing the USBs were colored by hand in red ink to obtain the vintage scratched look that G-Dragon had wanted. The label further explained that the coating was an intentional move that reflects the album concept, and is symbolic of G-Dragon's DNA and birth.

The drive itself does not contain the songs in a digital format; instead, users are directed to a download page for the album and other exclusive content from the YG Entertainment website, redeemed using a serial number. The unorthodox distribution model, however, resulted in concerns over whether the EP would be eligible to appear on South Korea's major album charts. The EP was disqualified from the Gaon Album Chart, as the Korean Music Content Industry Association argued per local copyright law that an "album" is defined as a physical medium supplied with music, and that Kwon Ji Yong was ineligible because the music was not supplied on the drive itself. G-Dragon responded to Gaon Chart excluding the sales for his USB as an album sale, writing in an Instagram post:

What’s the problem? Everything in the world has pros and cons, but the external form of music records has consistently changed from cassette tape to CD and then to download file. Isn’t the most important thing for music a good melody that will linger on the ears, mouths and minds of people for a long time and the lyrics that can touch people and make them laugh and cry?

In December 2017, Gaon Chart announced that they would change their policy to include different album formats like G-Dragon's USB, involving revising the definition of an album within copyright laws to be more inclusive of items that are not traditional offline albums. The new policy came into effect on January 1, 2018.

== Release and promotion ==
YG Entertainment announced the EP on May 31, revealing the title as Kwon Ji Yong, G-Dragon's birth name. "Bullshit" was originally announced as the first single on June 1, but was replaced by a different song, "Untitled, 2014", due to a controversy involving bandmate T.O.P and concerns over the provocative title of the original choice. The complete tracklist of the record was revealed a few hours prior to the release, with five songs trisected into three acts, bookended by an "intro" and "outro" track; individual cover art was also released for each song.

On March 31, it was revealed that G-Dragon would hold a concert at Seoul World Cup Stadium on June 10, 2017, his first solo performance in almost four years. On April 25, it was announced that G-Dragon was to embark on his second world tour, Act III: M.O.T.T.E, and tour dates were revealed from April through to June. In total, the tour was set to visit 29 cities across Asia, North America, Oceania, and Europe. G-Dragon performed the new songs off the EP for the first time on the tour's first show in Seoul.

== Music videos ==
In mid-May, filming for the music videos commenced, and concluded at the end of May, with three music videos having reportedly been filmed. On June 8, the music video for the lead single "Untitled, 2014" was released, a one-shot video featuring G-Dragon standing in front of a video projection of the sky, against an ambient background of clouds which mellifluously shifts to different hues of red, pink, blue, and green throughout the video. According to the director, Han Sa Min, the video was originally planned to be filmed in 2 days using different sets, however, G-Dragon completed shooting in record time and filming was finished in less than one hour. The music video was inspired by Cameron Crowe's psychological thriller, Vanilla Sky (2001).

Two months after the release of the album and its first single, the music video for the original lead single "Bullshit" was announced to be exclusively released on August 18, at 8:18pm KST to coincide with G-Dragon's 29th birthday. The video is available online via a download link on the USB accessible only to those who have purchased the physical version of the album. The music video was filmed in Los Angeles and featured a cameo appearance by American hip hop artist Tyler, the Creator.

== Critical reception ==
Professional ratings
Review scores
Source	Rating
Hello Asia	8/10
IZM	2.5/5 stars
SeoulBeats	5/5 stars
The Star	8/10

Tamar Herman from Billboard felt that Kwon Ji Yong was G-Dragon's most personal work, as he reflects "on his career, successes, and regrets". Herman complimented how the rapper puts his "inner thoughts out in the public through a variety of sounds but remains cohesive through its lyrics, as if requesting listeners to forget the singer's celeb stature and momentarily hear the thoughts of a man struggling with the present he's achieved through his past efforts." Fuse's Jeff Benjamin wrote that the album highlights "some of G-Dragon's biggest strengths as a forward-thinking hip-hop maestro", while also "counteracting those harder tracks" to spotlight his "less-seen tender side."

Chester Chin of The Star described Kwon Ji Yong as a "record made of emotional catharsis" with the tracks filled with "vulnerable disposition". In a rave review, Seoul Beats wrote that the EP is "the most cohesive effort G-Dragon put in to define himself, and who he really is" and stated that "the album is lyrically denser than anything they've heard so far this year", as it tells G-Dragon story: "it's filled with references to his previous works, rife with references to his personal life, his art he displays on his Instagram, and it's the first time I can say I'm positively blown away after a close listen. His personal struggle with himself, with who he is, G-Dragon or Kwon Ji-yong, and how his idol persona has changed him, clearly comes through on these tracks".

Affinity Magazine named the record the fourth best K-pop album of the year, feeling that it is "probably his most honest work to date" and that "although short, is just enough to make people feel the lyrics he wrote." The magazine also complimented how the "rawness and honesty of the lyrics make the audience feel instant empathy while dancing to the rhythm."

The album was chosen as the best Korean album released in 2017 by the music streaming service KKBOX, who called the record a "champion of the year", with all songs from the EP making KKBOX's list of the top 20 songs of the year. The album was chosen as one of the most-talked-about music releases in June 2017 by Douban.

== Commercial performance ==
In South Korea, the lead single "Untitled, 2014" debuted at number one on all major Korean music charts. In China, the album was available for pre-order on June 5, on China's three major music platforms QQ Music, KuGou and Kuwo. In less than 24 hours, pre-orders for the album on QQ Music reached over 200,000 copies. After one week of sales, the album had sold more than 1,100,000 copies in China. In Japan, the digital version topped the Oricon weekly digital chart, selling 11,641 copies, making G-Dragon the first Korean artist to top the chart.

Upon release, the album reached number one in 46 countries on iTunes at different times, setting a new record for a Korean artist. The EP debuted at No. 192 on the US Billboard 200 with just over 4,000 album-equivalent units sold, achieving his personal best sales week in America for a single day of sales. G-Dragon earned his third number-one album on the Billboard World Albums Chart, and his first number-one album on the Heatseekers Albums chart.

== Track listing ==
No.	Title	Lyrics	Music	Arrangement	Length
1.	"Middle Fingers-Up" (Intro. Korean: 권지용; RR: Kwon Ji-Yong)	G-Dragon	G-Dragon; 24; Kush	24	3:42
2.	"Bullshit" (Act I. 개소리; gaesori)	G-Dragon	G-Dragon; Teddy; Cawlr; Future Bounce; Choice37	Cawlr; Future Bounce; Choice37; 24	3:02
3.	"Super Star" (Act II)	G-Dragon; Teddy; Joe Rhee	Teddy; G-Dragon; Rhee; 24; Choice37; Future Bounce; Seo Won Jin	24; Teddy; Rhee; Choice37; Future Bounce; Seo	3:45
4.	"Untitled, 2014" (Act III. 무제; 無題; muje)	G-Dragon	G-Dragon; Choice37	Choice37; Seonwoo Jeonga	3:42
5.	"Divina Commedia" (Outro. 신곡; 神曲; singok)	G-Dragon; 8!; Brian Lee; Safe; Frank Dukes	G-Dragon; 8!; Lee; Frank Dukes; Safe; Thomas Bangalter; Guy Manuel Homem Christo	Frank Dukes; Murda Beatz; Lee	3:44
Total length:					18:16

Sample credits

- "Divina Commedia" contains samples of "Veridis Quo", written by Thomas Bangalter and Guy-Manuel de Homem-Christo, and performed by Daft Punk.

== Charts ==
Chart performance for Kwon Ji Yong
Chart (2017–2018)	Peak position
Canadian Albums (Billboard)	52
French Download Albums (SNEP)	33
Japanese Albums (Oricon)	3
Japan Hot Albums (Billboard)	1
New Zealand Albums (RMNZ)	39
South Korean Albums (Gaon)	51
US Billboard 200	192
US Independent Albums (Billboard)	8
US Rap Album Sales (Billboard)	3
US World Albums (Billboard)	1

== Sales ==
Sales of Kwon Ji Yong
Country	Sales amount
China (digital album)	1,500,000
Japan	64,829 (Note: Digital + physical sales for Kwon Ji Yong)
South Korea	113,528
United States	7,000

== Release history ==
Release history and formats for Kwon Ji Yong
Region	Date	Editions	Label	Format	Ref.
Various	June 8, 2017	Standard	YG Entertainment	Digital download	
South Korea	June 19, 2017	Exclusive content (online)	YG Entertainment	USB	
Taiwan	June 30, 2017	Exclusive content (online)	Warner Music Taiwan	USB	
Japan	December 13, 2017	Exclusive content (online)	YGEX	CD; CD+DVD	
Japan	December 13, 2017	Standard	YGEX	Playbutton	
