= Bullshit (G-Dragon song) =

Song by G-Dragon

Song by G-Dragon

from the EP Kwon Ji Yong
- Language: Korean; English
- Released: June 8, 2017
- Genre: K-hip hop
- Length: 3:02
- Label: YG
- Songwriter(s): G-Dragon
- Producer(s): G-Dragon; Teddy Park; Cawlr; Future Bounce; Choice37

Audio video
- "Bullshit" on YouTube

"Bullshit" (Korean: 개소리; RR: Gaesori) is a song by South Korean rapper G-Dragon. It was released on June 8, 2017 through YG Entertainment as part of his second extended play (EP) Kwon Ji Yong. The song was co-produced by G-Dragon, Teddy Park, Cawlr, Future Bounce, and Choice37, with lyrics penned by G-Dragon. The track was originally slated to serve as the EP's title track, but was replaced with "Untitled, 2014" on the day of its release.

== Background and composition ==
Upon the initial announcement of G-Dragon's second Korean-language extended play Kwon Ji Yong, the track "Bullshit" was originally slated to serve as the EP's title track. However on the day of the EP's release on June 8, YG announced that the title track would instead be "Untitled, 2014", for reasons not immediately disclosed. Due to the provocative nature of "Bullshit", many observers have speculated that the sudden change was made due to BigBang bandmate T.O.P's ongoing marijuana scandal and drug overdose, which occurred a few days prior and required T.O.P having to be hospitalized. The switch in title tracks allowed for G-Dragon to showcase a more private and intimate side of his musicality, underneath his well-known stage persona as reflected in "Bullshit".

Musically, the song has been described as profanity-filled hip-hop song that incorporates a pulsating chorus flanked with dynamic instrumentals, sudden beat and rhythm changes. It was written by G-Dragon and co-produced by himself, Teddy Park, Cawlr, Future Bounce and Choice37. A multi-layered track, "Bullshit" revolves around G-Dragon's status as a superstar—directly referencing "Crayon" (2012) by title—while the barking alludes to his Diplo-Baauer collab, "Coup d'Etat" (2013). In the track, he cements his status by stating "G ain't no bullshit, bitch, I'm real". Written in the key signature of C Major, the track possesses a moderate tempo of 96 beats per minute, and has a runtime of 3:02.

== Reception ==
"Bullshit" sold an estimated 288,051 digital downloads in South Korea.

== Live performances and music video ==
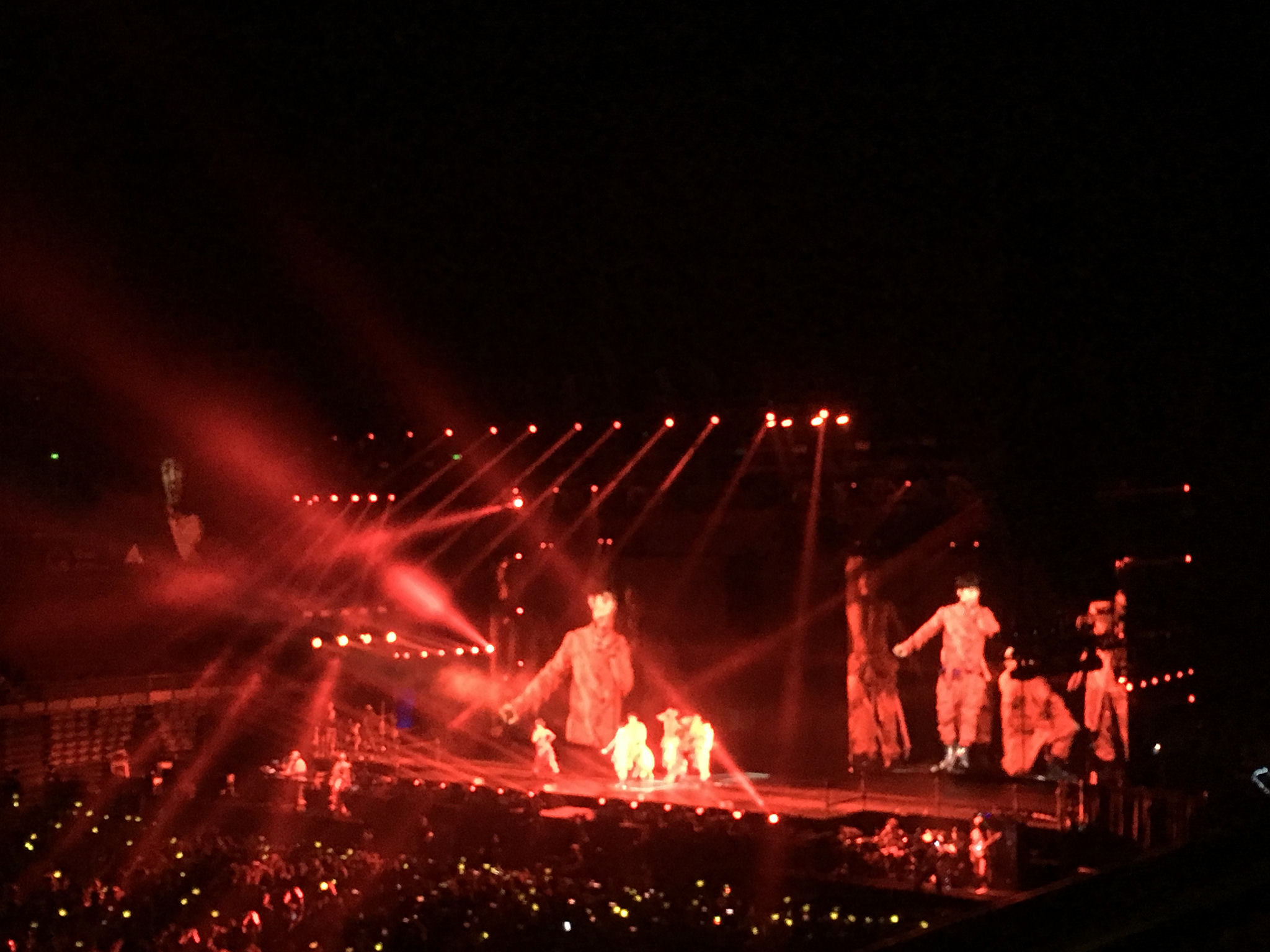
G-Dragon performing the song on his M.O.T.T.E World Tour in Sydney

G-Dragon performed the song live for the first time on his second worldwide concert tour, titled Act III: M.O.T.T.E World Tour, at the Seoul World Cup Stadium on June 10, 2017. The setlist featured all of the tracks in the EP, including "Bullshit".

Two months after the release of Kwon Ji Yong, G-Dragon announced that a music video for the track would be exclusively released on August 18, 2017 at 8:18 PM KST to coincide with his 29th birthday. The video was made available online via a download link on the USB accessible only to those who have purchased the physical version of the EP. The music video was filmed in Los Angeles and featured a cameo appearance by American hip hop artist Tyler, the Creator.

== Charts ==
Weekly chart performance for "Bullshit"
Chart (2017)	Peak position
South Korea (Gaon)	6
South Korea (K-pop Hot 100)	21
US World Digital Songs (Billboard)	10

== Release history ==
Release dates and formats
Region	Date	Format(s)	Label	Ref.
Various	June 8, 2017	Digital download; streaming	YG Entertainment	
