= Untitled, 2014 =

Single by G-Dragon

from the EP Kwon Ji Yong
- Language: Korean
- Released: June 8, 2017
- Genre: K-pop
- Length: 3:42
- Label: YG
- Songwriters: G-Dragon; Choice37
- Producers: G-Dragon; Choice37; Sunwoo Jung-a

G-Dragon singles chronology
"Palette" (2017)	"Untitled, 2014" (2017)	"Power" (2024)

Music video
- "Untitled, 2014" on YouTube

"Untitled, 2014" (Korean: 무제 (無題); RR: Muje) is a song recorded by South Korean rapper G-Dragon, serving as the lead single for his second extended play and self-titled Kwon Ji Yong (2017). It was written by G-Dragon, who also co-produced the song with Choice37 and Sunwoo Jung-a. "Untitled, 2014" was a chart-topper in South Korea's Gaon Digital Chart, where it finished 2017 as one of the best-performing songs of the year.

== Background and composition ==
G-Dragon toured extensively from 2015 to 2016 with his band Big Bang to promote their third Korean album Made (2016),^{[105][106]} After promotional activities wrapped up, G-Dragon began preparing for his comeback, having been almost four years since his last solo release. The single "Bullshit" was set to serve as the lead single to precede the release of his second self-titled EP. However, after a controversy involving his fellow BigBang member, T.O.P, G-Dragon serviced "Untitled, 2014" to radio instead. Though he's primarily a rapper, "Untitled, 2014" features G-Dragon only singing over a "single piano accompaniment". The song was composed using common time in the key of E major, with a moderate tempo of 80 beats per minute.

Described as an "evocative, simple piano ballad" by Billboard, the single is said to showcase G-Dragon at his "most vulnerable". Hype Beast calls it a "heart-wrenching ballad". Without any percussion or beat, Jeff Benjamin of Fuse compares the song to Adele's "Someone like You" for its simplicity. Lyrically, the single is "a letter to a past lover", with G-Dragon "apologizing for his past actions, asking for forgiveness and the chance to see his ex again even if it's just one more time or in his dreams."

== Critical reception ==
Taylor Glasby of Dazed called the song "beautiful", "emotionally charged" and "a raw emotion that cracks at the edges", and wrote that, even though G-Dragon "clearly enjoys creating the spectacle when it comes to his music", he "loses nothing when stripped of it". Tamar Herman of Billboard noted that "Untitled, 2014" "presents the simplest, most honest version" of himself that the artist "has ever put forward". Erica Russel from the website PopCrush highlighted that his "delicate yet powerful vocals shimmer on the sparse" ballad. In a positive review, Douglas Markowitz of Miami New Times stated that "[a]fter years in the game, all it takes for this mega-star to soar above the competition is piano and vocal."

== Commercial performance ==
"Untitled, 2014" debuted atop South Korean music charts, a feat that, since the Ministry of Culture, Sports and Tourism changed the regulation of the charts in February of the year, has only been achieved before by IU. Later in the week, the single reached a "perfect all-kill", topping all major music charts simultaneously, as well as placing first on the daily and weekly charts.

Even though it was released with only three days left in the tracking week, "Untitled, 2014" debuted at number one in the Gaon Digital, and Download charts, with 218,500 copies sold. In the streaming chart, the track debuted at number 10 with over 4 million streams. In the second week, the single fell to number two in the Digital chart but rose to the first position in the Streaming chart, with 7,406,802 audio streams. Additionally, "Untitled, 2014" topped the Gaon BGM Chart for three consecutive weeks. For the month of June, "Untitled, 2014" topped Gaon's Digital, BGM and Download Monthly Charts with 555,587 copies sold.

By the end of 2017, "Untitled, 2014" was the 16th best-performing song of the year in his home country, with 1,476 million downloads and over 74 million streams in South Korea.

== Music video ==
On June 8, 2017, YG Entertainment released the music video of "Untitled, 2014", which features G-Dragon himself singing in it. The music video was originally planned to be filmed within 2 days using different sets and various shots. However, it was shot in a single take, and filming was finished in less than an hour.

The music video gained over 1 million views in just 4 hours after release, and in 24 hours it reached over 5.6 million views on YouTube. On August 10, 2019, the music video surpassed 100 million views on YouTube.

== Accolades ==
Awards
Year	Organization	Award	Result	Ref.
2018	Gaon Chart Music Awards	Song of the Year (June)	Won	

Music program awards
Program	Date	Ref.
Show! Music Core	June 17, 2017	
Show! Music Core	June 24, 2017	
Inkigayo	June 18, 2017	
Inkigayo	June 25, 2017	
Show Champion	June 21, 2017	
Music Bank	June 30, 2017	

== Charts ==
=== Weekly charts ===
Chart (2017)	Peak position
Japan (Japan Hot 100)	57
South Korea (Circle)	1
US World Digital Song Sales (Billboard)	4

=== Year-end charts ===
Chart	Year	Position
South Korea (Circle)	2017	16
South Korea (Circle)	2025	63

== Sales ==
Sales for "Untitled, 2014"
Country	Sales
South Korea (digital)	1,476,371
China (KuGou)	525,000
