= Lovesick Girls =

- Promotional graphic

Single by Blackpink

from the album The Album
- Language: Korean; English
- Released: October 2, 2020
- Studio: The Black Label (Seoul)
- Genre: Dance-pop; electropop
- Length: 3:14
- Label: YG; Interscope
- Composers: Teddy; 24; Jennie; Brian Lee; Leah Haywood; R.Tee; David Guetta
- Lyricists: Teddy; Løren; Jisoo; Jennie; Danny Chung

Blackpink singles chronology
"Ice Cream" (2020)	"Lovesick Girls" (2020)	"Pink Venom" (2022)

Music video
- "Lovesick Girls" on YouTube "Lovesick Girls (JP Ver.)" on YouTube

"Lovesick Girls" is a song by South Korean girl group Blackpink, recorded for their debut studio album, The Album (2020). It was released on October 2, 2020, through YG Entertainment and Interscope Records, as the third single from the album. The Japanese version of the single was released through Interscope Records and Universal Music Japan on June 4, 2021. The song was composed by Teddy, 24, Jennie, Brian Lee, Leah Haywood, R.Tee, and David Guetta, while its lyrics were written by Teddy, Løren, Jisoo, Jennie, and Danny Chung. It is a dance-pop and electropop song containing influences from EDM and punk rock, with lyrics exploring pain associated with heartbreak.

"Lovesick Girls" received acclaim from music critics for its production and musical styles. Commercially, the song peaked at number two on the Billboard Global 200 and number one on the Global Excl. U.S., becoming Blackpink's first number-one on the latter chart. The song peaked at number two on the Gaon Digital Chart in South Korea, and topped charts in Hong Kong, Malaysia, and Singapore. It also peaked at number 59 on the US Billboard Hot 100, and appeared on the record charts in other 14 countries. The song received platinum certifications in streaming in South Korea and Japan and gold certifications in Australia and New Zealand.

An accompanying music video, directed by Seo Hyun-seung, features the group cycling through romantic scenarios and relationship arguments. It became the sixth biggest 24-hour debut for a music video on the platform at the time with 61.4 million views. To promote "Lovesick Girls" in South Korea, Blackpink performed the song on the music programs Show! Music Core and Inkigayo. Internationally, the group appeared and performed it on programs such as Good Morning America and Jimmy Kimmel Live! in the United States in 2020 and Music Station in Japan in 2021. "Lovesick Girls" was included in the set list for the group's Born Pink World Tour (2022–2023), in addition to their headlining sets at the Coachella festival in California and BST Hyde Park festival in London.

== Background and release ==
Beginning on September 22, 2020, Blackpink's label YG Entertainment uploaded various teasers for The Album from each member on their respective social media accounts. The song's name, "Lovesick Girls", and its release date were unveiled on September 27. The announcement was accompanied by the release of a teaser poster, which featured the group members leaning on one another, with the song's logo planted on the top. Shortly afterwards, YG unveiled "Lovesick Girls" as the "main track" from its parent album, The Album. On September 29, 2020, the official tracklist for the album was released via Twitter.

"Lovesick Girls" was made available in conjunction with The Album on October 2, 2020, serving as the record's third single following "How You Like That" and "Ice Cream" (with Selena Gomez), which were released in June and August, respectively. In Italy, it was released to the airplay market on October 16, 2020. The Japanese version of the single was first made available through contemporary hit radio in Japan under Interscope Records and Universal Music Japan on June 4, 2021. It was subsequently released for digital download and streaming on July 13, in support of the release of the Japanese edition of The Album for August 3, 2021.

== Composition and lyrics ==
"Lovesick Girls"
A 20-second sample of "Lovesick Girls", which is a dance-pop song infused with electropop, EDM, and acoustic guitar instrumentals. Its lyrics explore independence and pain associated with heartbreak.

"Lovesick Girls" was composed by Teddy, 24, Jennie, Brian Lee, Leah Haywood, R.Tee, and David Guetta, with lyrics written by Teddy, Løren, Jisoo, Jennie, and Danny Chung, as well as Co-Sho for the Japanese version. It is composed in the key of G-flat major with a tempo of 128 beats per minute. Musically, "Lovesick Girls" is a dance-pop and electropop number containing influences from EDM and punk rock, incorporating acoustic guitar instrumentations. Kat Moon from Time wrote that Blackpink's voices "are layered over acoustic guitar to create a breezy and mellow ambience", contrasting its production to "the hard-hitting nature" of the group's 2018 and 2019 singles. Douglas Greenwood from British Vogue highlighted the song's "dreamy electronica" production, and wrote that its soundscape felt "liberating" and "club-friendly".

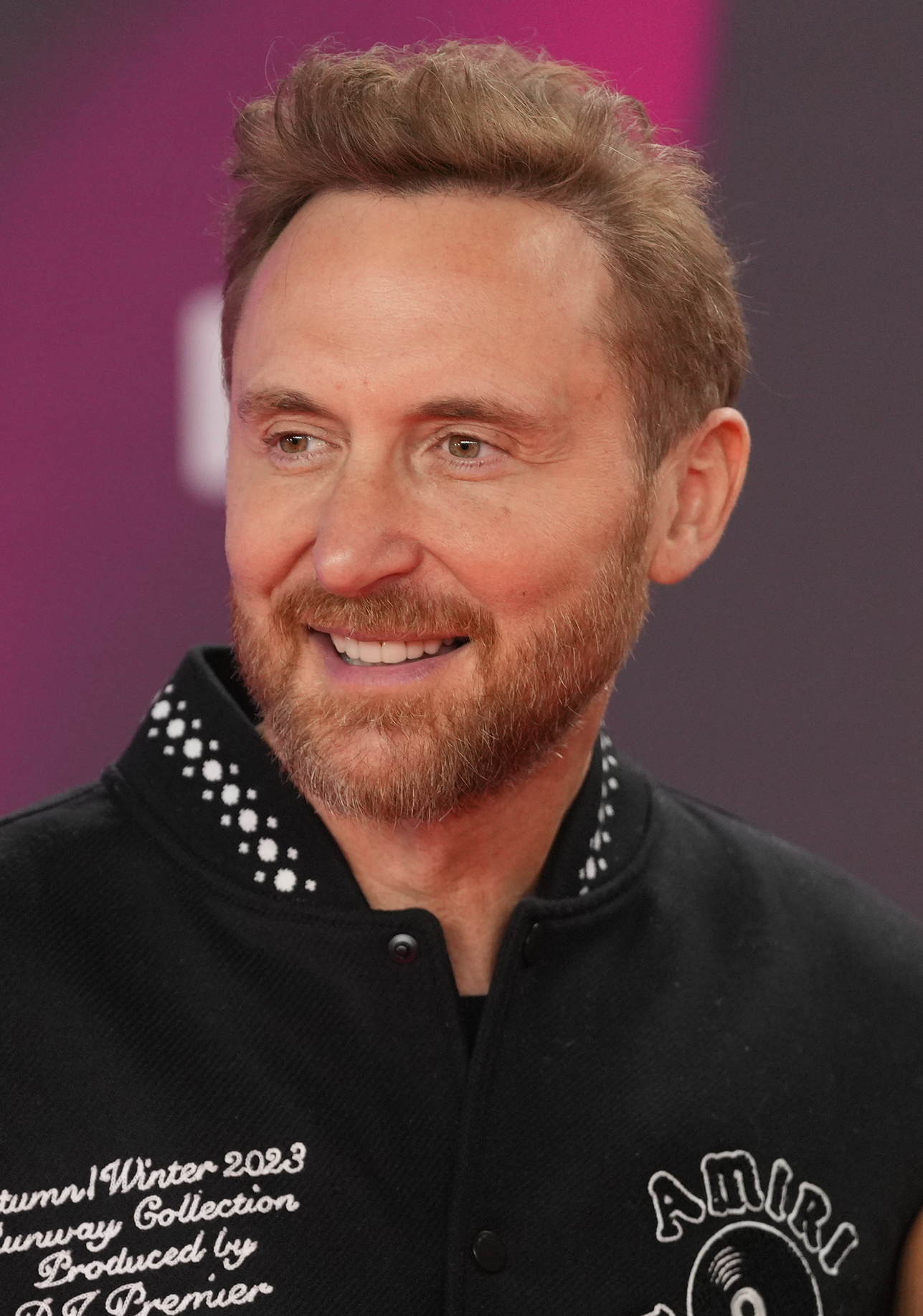
"Lovesick Girls" features songwriting contributions from David Guetta.

The lyrical content of "Lovesick Girls" explores owning independence through heartbreak, with Jason Pham from StyleCaster describing the track as a "heartfelt anthem about longing for love, despite knowing how much it hurts". Discussing the concept and the meaning of the song, Jisoo explained: "It's a song that sends a hopeful message revolving around girls who are constantly hurt in relationships but again set out for a new love. I think many people will be able to empathize with the song". South China Morning Post's Sue Ng noted its use of the idiom "set in stone" to express pain associated with breakup: "No diamond rings, that set in stone / To the left, better left alone". The phrase questions why the members would look for love despite harboring the feeling that they were "born to be alone"; it describes an outcome that they find difficult to change.

== Critical reception ==
The song was met with acclaim from music critics. Ranking it the second best track of the album, Billboard's Jason Lipshutz opined that the song demonstrated the ambition of Blackpink "as they tackle well-worn subject matter with a fresh aesthetic". Callie Ahlgrim from Insider called "Lovesick Girls" an "EDM-flavored sequel" to Ariana Grande's 2019 single "7 Rings", while Tim Chan from Rolling Stone wrote how it "turns a familiar lament about being alone into an anthemic dance track that’s just begging for a lightstick and clubs to reopen". Hannah Zwick from Consequence of Sound praised the group's vocals and regarded "Lovesick Girls" as the highlight track from The Album. Moon from Time agreed, lauding "Lovesick Girls" as the "true gem" of the record and commended its blend of Blackpink's characteristic "heavy electronic production" with a more "stripped back" musical arrangement. Raul Stanciu from Sputnikmusic wrote that the song "is probably the closest Blackpink have steered towards the lovely disco grooves of 'As If It's Your Last'" in 2017, which he deemed as one of the group's best singles.

Jo Ji-hyeon of IZM ranked "Lovesick Girls" amongst the best records released in South Korea during 2020, writing that it aptly blends the vibrant charm of 2000s American teen pop with Blackpink's distinctive style. She felt that the song's synthesizer riffs and tightly woven electronic sound, which embodied the essence of K-pop, generated a source of "thrilling pleasure". Taylor Glasby from Dazed ranked it the 14th best K-pop song of 2020, praising its composition and highlighting how Jisoo and Rosé's "vocal rawness" brought depth to its production. Don Jaucian from CNN Philippines felt that although the group may have had released similar singles before, they had never "bared their souls like in 'Lovesick Girls'", and remarked that it is "sure to become the powerful anthem that it is in many years to come".

== Accolades ==
"Lovesick Girls" achieved the top spot on various South Korean weekly music programs, such as Inkigayo, Music Bank, and Show! Music Core due to its success on digital platforms. The song won six music show awards, including three consecutive wins on Inkigayo. It also received three Melon Popularity Awards on October 12, 2020, and January 11 and 18, 2021.

Awards and nominations
Year	Organization	Award	Result	Ref.
2020	Asian Pop Music Awards	Best Music Video (Overseas)	Nominated	
2021	BreakTudo Awards	International Music Video	Won	
2021	Circle Chart Music Awards	Artist of the Year – Digital Music (October)	Won	
2021	MTV MIAW Awards Brazil	Best Global Hit	Won	
2021	RTHK International Pop Poll Awards	Top Ten International Gold Songs	Won	

Music program awards
Program	Date	Ref.
Inkigayo	October 11, 2020	
Inkigayo	October 18, 2020	
Inkigayo	October 25, 2020	
Show Champion	October 14, 2020	
M Countdown	October 15, 2020	
Music Bank	October 16, 2020	

== Commercial performance ==
"Lovesick Girls" debuted at number two on the Billboard Global 200 and at number one on the Global Excl. U.S., becoming Blackpink's first chart-topper on the latter. It debuted with 114 million streams and 17,000 downloads sold outside the United States. It dropped down to number five in its second week. In total, the song spent 14 weeks on the Global 200. In the US, "Lovesick Girls" debuted at number 59 on the Billboard Hot 100 chart in the week of October 17, 2020. During the same week, the song debuted atop the US Billboard World Digital Songs chart, giving Blackpink their seventh career chart-topper following "How You Like That".

In South Korea, the song debuted at number 28 on the Gaon Digital Chart on the week ending October 3, 2020, with less than two days of tracking. It rose to number two and peaked the following week; Blackpink's second track to reach the top two, following "Kill This Love" in 2019. The single was the third best-performing song of October, peaking at number three on the monthly Gaon Digital Chart. Elsewhere, the song debuted at number one on the national RIM chart and RIAS chart of Malaysia and Singapore, respectively. In Europe and Oceania, "Lovesick Girls" peaked at number 40 on the UK Singles Chart in the United Kingdom, as well as at number 27 in Australia and 35 in New Zealand. It received a gold certification from the Australian Recording Industry Association (ARIA) in 2023, as well as platinum streaming certifications from the Recording Industry Association of Japan (RIAJ) and Korea Music Content Association (KMCA) for surpassing 100 million streams in each country.

== Music video ==
A scene in the music video, where Blackpink throw french fries in a bodega.

On September 30, 2020, the group released a 16-second teaser of the song and music video on their official YouTube channel. The accompanying music video was released in conjunction with The Album on October 2. Blackpink broke their own personal record by surpassing 10 million views for the music video in less than 52 minutes (the group's previous record, "Ice Cream", surpassed 10 million views in 2 hours and 55 minutes). It surpassed 50 million views in only 18 hours after release. The visual garnered 61.4 million views in its first 24 hours, becoming the sixth most-viewed YouTube video in 24 hours for a music video at the time. In August 2023, the video surpassed 700 million views. The behind the scenes video was uploaded a day after the music video on October 3, while the dance practice video was uploaded five days later. The dance practice video features the members performing the song's choreography in a "rustic looking" dance studio.

Directed by Seo Hyun-seung, the official music video sees the group members exploring the highs and lows of relationships. It opens with Jennie, Lisa, Jisoo, and Rosé sitting in a pink Cadillac. They appear in a field before moving forward to the members getting into a heated argument in a wrecked, graffiti-covered car on an urban street, whilst singing, "We are the lovesick girls / But we were born to be alone / Yeah, we were born to be alone / But why we still looking for love." Lovesickness strikes them in various ways, such as through moody walks in a day-glo field, guitar-smashing outbursts, choreographed late-night street dances, smashing car headlights with a sledgehammer, breathless midnight sprints throughout streets, angsty therapy sessions, a trip to a paintball range, and a food fight in a bodega. The video employs fashion to express emotions, integrating darker attire to symbolize pain and loss, while juxtaposing it with brighter outfits that convey a sense of hope.

Insider editor Callie Ahlgrim ranked the "Lovesick Girls" video number 25 in their list of the 45 best music videos of 2020, praising the video's choreography, rich color schemes, and unique storyline for each member. Following the release of the music video, however, the Korean Health and Medical Workers Union raised concerns about member Jennie's nurse outfit which was featured in her solo scene. The union released a statement stating that YG Entertainment "sexually objectified the image of a nurse" in the video, and that "the costume perpetuated hyper-sexualized stereotypes about the profession". In response, YG Entertainment reuploaded the music video on October 7, 2020, with the controversial scene deleted.

== Live performances and other usage ==
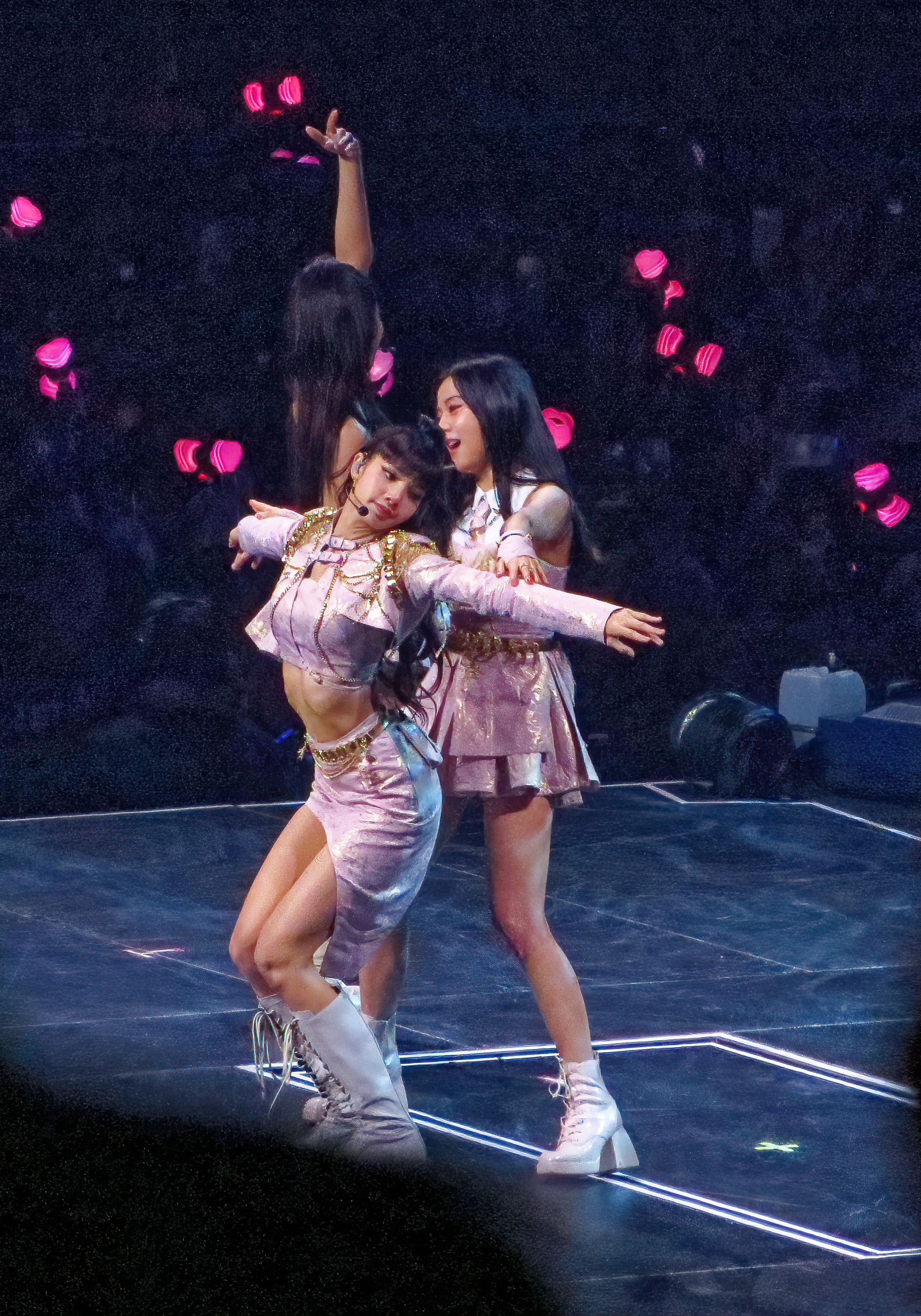
Lisa and Jisoo performing the song during the Born Pink World Tour in London, 2022

Blackpink promoted the song on several music programs in South Korea throughout October 2020, including Show! Music Core and Inkigayo. In the US, Blackpink performed the song on Good Morning America and Jimmy Kimmel Live! in October. In Indonesia, the group performed the song at the Waktu Indonesia Belanja, an event held by e-commerce platform Tokopedia on November 25, 2020. Upon the release of the Japanese version of "Lovesick Girls", Blackpink appeared and performed on the music program Music Station in Tokyo on August 20, 2021. It was included in the setlist for their second world tour the Born Pink World Tour (2022–2023). It was also performed during the group's headlining sets at Coachella in California, where rainbow streamers were shot into the sky, and BST Hyde Park in London in 2023.

Pentagon performed a cover of "Lovesick Girls" on it's Live in November 2020, renaming it "Lovesick Boys". A year later, Tri.be covered the song on the same program. In March 2021, Seoho and Leedo from Oneus performed a cover of the song, which was uploaded to 1theK Originals's YouTube channel. On television, the song was used during a prom scene in the Mexican film Anónima, which was released through Netflix in December 2021. "Lovesick Girls" was included on the film's original soundtrack. It was featured in The Simpsons episode "From Beer to Paternity" in November 2022, where the characters Homer, Duffman, and Lisa Simpson sing along to the song on a road trip.

== Credits and personnel ==
Credits adapted from the liner notes of The Album and The Album – JP Ver.

Recording

- Recorded at The Black Label Studio (Seoul)
- Mixed at The Lab (Los Angeles) and MixStar Studios (Virginia Beach, Virginia)
- Mastered at Sterling Sound (New York City)

Personnel

- Blackpink – vocals
  - Jisoo – lyricist
  - Jennie – lyricist, composer
- Teddy – lyricist, composer
- Løren – lyricist
- Danny Chung – lyricist
- Co-sho – lyricist (Japanese version)
- 24 – composer, arranger
- Brian Lee – composer
- Leah Haywood – composer
- R.Tee – composer, arranger
- David Guetta – composer
- Yong In Choi – recording engineer
- Jason Robert – mixing engineer
- Serban Ghenea – mixing engineer
- Randy Merrill – mastering engineer

== Charts ==
=== Weekly charts ===
Weekly chart performance for "Lovesick Girls"
Chart (2020)	Peak position
Australia (ARIA)	27
Canada Hot 100 (Billboard)	29
Czech Republic Singles Digital (ČNS IFPI)	76
France (SNEP)	130
Global 200 (Billboard)	2
Greece International (IFPI)	33
Hong Kong (HKRIA)	1
Hungary (Stream Top 40)	38
Ireland (IRMA)	39
Japan (Japan Hot 100)	12
Japan Combined Singles (Oricon)	12
Lithuania (AGATA)	48
Malaysia (RIM)	1
Mexico Airplay (Billboard)	50
Netherlands (Single Tip)	14
Netherlands (Global Top 40)	1
New Zealand (Recorded Music NZ)	35
Portugal (AFP)	23
Scottish Singles Sales (Official Charts)	37
Singapore (RIAS)	1
Slovakia Singles Digital (ČNS IFPI)	78
South Korea (Gaon)	2
South Korea (K-pop Hot 100)	2
Sweden Heatseeker (Sverigetopplistan)	13
UK Singles (Official Charts)	40
US Billboard Hot 100	59
US World Digital Song Sales (Billboard)	1

=== Monthly charts ===
Monthly chart performance for "Lovesick Girls"
Chart (2020)	Peak position
South Korea (Gaon)	3

=== Year-end charts ===
2020 year-end chart performance for "Lovesick Girls"
Chart (2020)	Position
South Korea (Gaon)	62

2021 year-end chart performance for "Lovesick Girls"
Chart (2021)	Position
South Korea (Gaon)	14

2022 year-end chart performance for "Lovesick Girls"
Chart (2022)	Position
South Korea (Circle)	151

== Certifications ==
Certifications for "Lovesick Girls"
Region	Certification	Certified units/sales
Australia (ARIA)	Gold	35,000^{‡}
Brazil (Pro-Música Brasil)	3× Platinum	120,000^{‡}
New Zealand (RMNZ)	Gold	15,000^{‡}
Streaming
Japan (RIAJ)	Platinum	100,000,000^{†}
South Korea (KMCA)	Platinum	100,000,000^{†}
^{‡} Sales+streaming figures based on certification alone.^{†} Streaming-only figures based on certification alone.

== Release history ==
Release dates and formats for "Lovesick Girls"
Region	Date	Version	Format	Label	Ref.
Various	October 2, 2020	Korean	Digital download; streaming	YG; Interscope	
Italy	October 16, 2020	Korean	Contemporary hit radio	Universal	
Japan	June 4, 2021	Japanese	Contemporary hit radio	Interscope; Universal Japan	
Various	July 13, 2021	Japanese	Digital download; streaming	Interscope; Universal Japan	

== See also ==
- List of best-selling girl group singles
- List of Billboard Global 200 top-ten singles in 2020
- List of Billboard Global Excl. U.S. number ones of 2020
- List of certified songs in South Korea
- List of Inkigayo Chart winners (2020)
- List of K-pop songs on the Billboard charts
- List of M Countdown Chart winners (2020)
- List of Music Bank Chart winners (2020)
- List of number-one songs of 2020 (Malaysia)
- List of number-one songs of 2020 (Singapore)
- List of Show Champion Chart winners (2020)
