= Treasure discography =

Band discography

- Treasure in 2023
- Studio albums: 2
- EPs: 5
- Live albums: 3
- Singles: 8
- Promotional singles: 9
- Single albums: 5
- Soundtrack appearances: 2

South Korean boy band, Treasure, encapsulates a discography of two studio albums, five extended plays, three live albums, four single albums, eight singles, nine promotional singles and two soundtrack appearances. In the first five months of its career, the band sold over one million physical albums, and recorded a platinum certification in South Korea by the Korea Music Copyright Association (KMCA) for all of its releases.

== Albums ==
=== Studio albums ===
List of studio albums, with selected details, chart positions, and sales
Title	Details	Peak chart positions					Sales	Certifications
Title	Details	KOR	FIN Phy.	JPN	JPN Hot	US Sales	Sales	Certifications
The First Step: Treasure Effect	Released: January 11, 2021; Released: March 31, 2021 (JPN); Label: YG Entertainment, YGEX; Formats: CD, DVD, digital download	1	10	1 (Note: The Korean version of the album originally peaked at number 6; the Japanese version reached a peak of number 1 in April 2021.)	1	—	KOR: 419,630; JPN: 138,348 (Note: Sales figures for The First Step: Treasure Effect: Digital sales: 1,466; Physical sales: 136,887)	KMCA: Platinum
Reboot	Released: July 28, 2023; Released: February 21, 2024 (JPN); Label: YG Entertainment, Columbia, YGEX; Formats: CD, DVD, digital download	1	—	1	1	61	KOR: 1,903,997; JPN: 517,526 (Note: Sales figures for Reboot: Digital sales: 1,015; Physical sales: 516,511)	KMCA: Million; RIAJ: 2× Platinum

=== Live albums ===
List of live albums, with selected details, chart positions, and sales
Title	Details	Peak chart positions	Sales
Title	Details	JPN	Sales
Treasure Japan Tour 2022–23 Hello Special in Kyocera Dome Osaka	Released: December 6, 2023; Label: YGEX; Formats: CD, DVD, digital download	1	JPN: 25,739 (Note: Sales figures for Treasure Japan Tour 2022–23 Hello Special in Kyocera Dome Osaka: DVD sales: 11,473; Blu-ray sales: 14,266)
2024 Treasure Tour Reboot in Japan + 2024 Treasure Fan Meeting Wonderland	Released: November 6, 2024; Label: YGEX; Formats: CD, DVD, digital download	3	JPN: 19,808 (Note: Sales figures for 2024 Treasure Tour Reboot In Japan + 2024 Treasure Fan Meeting Wonderland: DVD sales: 9,891; Blu-ray sales: 9,917)
Treasure the Stage 2026 New Wav: Live in Japan	Released: October 30, 2026; Label: YGEX; Formats: CD, digital download	11	JPN: 9,812

== Extended plays ==
List of extended plays, with selected details, chart positions, and sales
Title	Details	Peak chart positions			Sales	Certifications
Title	Details	KOR	JPN	JPN Hot	Sales	Certifications
The Second Step: Chapter One	Released: February 15, 2022; Released: March 31, 2022 (JPN); Label: YG Entertainment, YGEX; Formats: CD, DVD, digital download	1	1	1	KOR: 839,911; JPN: 165,109 (Note: Sales figures for The Second Step: Chapter One: Digital sales: 1,020; Physical sales: 164,089)	KMCA: 3× Platinum
The Second Step: Chapter Two	Released: October 4, 2022; Released: November 30, 2022 (JPN); Label: YG Entertainment, YGEX; Formats: CD, DVD, digital download	2	2	2	KOR: 665,335; JPN: 207,117 (Note: Sales figures for The Second Step: Chapter Two: Digital sales: 1,092; Physical sales: 206,025)	KMCA: 2× Platinum; RIAJ: Gold
Pleasure	Released: March 7, 2025; Label: YG Entertainment, Columbia; Formats: CD, digital download	1	2	4	KOR: 787,366; JPN: 205,686 (Note: Sales figures for Pleasure: Physical sales: 205,309; Digital sales: 377)	KMCA: 3× Platinum; RIAJ: Platinum
Love Pulse	Released: September 1, 2025; Label: YG Entertainment; Formats: CD, digital download	3	1	2	KOR: 1,148,668; JPN: 360,111	KMCA: Million; RIAJ: Platinum
New Wav	Released: June 1, 2026; Label: YG Entertainment; Formats: CD, digital download	1	1	1	KOR: 1,017,219; JPN: 85,401	

== Single albums ==
List of single albums, with selected details, chart positions, and sales
Title	Details	Peak chart positions		Sales	Certifications
Title	Details	KOR	JPN	Sales	Certifications
Korean
The First Step: Chapter One	Released: August 7, 2020; Label: YG Entertainment; Formats: CD, digital download	1	— (Note: The First Step: Chapter One did not enter the Oricon Singles Chart, but peaked at number 33 on the combined singles chart.)	KOR: 265,190	KMCA: Platinum
The First Step: Chapter Two	Released: September 18, 2020; Label: YG Entertainment; Formats: CD, digital download	2	—	KOR: 259,640	KMCA: Platinum
The First Step: Chapter Three	Released: November 6, 2020; Label: YG Entertainment; Formats: CD, digital download	1	—	KOR: 256,270	KMCA: Platinum
Japanese
Here I Stand	Released: March 29, 2023; Label: YGEX; Formats: CD, DVD, digital download	—	2	JPN: 243,907	RIAJ: Platinum
King Kong / Reverse	Released: August 19, 2024; Label: YGEX; Formats: CD, DVD, digital download	—	2	JPN: 108,347	RIAJ: Gold

== Singles ==
List of singles, showing year released, with chart positions, sales figures and album name
Title	Year	Peak chart positions										Sales	Album
Title	Year	KOR	IDN	JPN Hot	MLY	MLY Songs	PHL	SGP	US World	VIE	WW	Sales	Album
"Boy"	2020	—	—	46	—	—	—	— (Note: "Boy" did not enter the RIAS Top Streaming Chart, but peaked at number 15 on the regional chart.)	7	—	—	—N/a	The First Step: Treasure Effect
"I Love You" (사랑해)	2020	—	—	— (Note: "I Love You" did not enter the Billboard Japan Hot 100 Chart, but peaked at number 55 on the download chart.)	—	—	—	— (Note: "Boy" did not enter the RIAS Top Streaming Chart, but peaked at number 28 on the regional chart.)	9	—	170	—N/a	The First Step: Treasure Effect
"Mmm" (음)	2020	— (Note: "Mmm" did not enter the Gaon Digital Chart, but peaked at number 165 on the download chart.)	—	— (Note: "Mmm" did not enter the Billboard Japan Hot 100 Chart, but peaked at number 90 on the download chart.)	—	—	—	—	11	—	— (Note: "Mmm" did not enter the Billboard Global 200, but peaked at number 116 on the Excl. U.S. chart.)	—N/a	The First Step: Treasure Effect
"My Treasure"	2021	— (Note: "My Treasure" did not enter the Gaon Digital Chart, but peaked at number 20 on the download chart.)	—	54	—	—	—	—	—	—	—	—N/a	The First Step: Treasure Effect
"Jikjin" (직진)	2022	69	1	21	13	1	7	— (Note: "Jikjin" did not enter the RIAS Top Streaming Chart, but peaked at number 22 on the regional chart.)	—	41	110	—N/a	The Second Step: Chapter One
"Hello"	2022	97	4	43	—	22	—	—	—	—	— (Note: "Hello" did not enter the Billboard Global 200, but peaked at number 190 on the Excl. U.S. chart.)	—N/a	The Second Step: Chapter Two
"Move" (T5)	2023	162	—	56	—	—	—	—	—	—	—	JPN: 1,357	Reboot
"Bona Bona"	2023	27	11	14	—	—	—	—	—	—	— (Note: "Bona Bona" did not enter the Billboard Global 200, but peaked at number 162 on the Excl. U.S. chart.)	JPN: 1,255	Reboot
"King Kong"	2024	161	—	3	—	—	—	—	—	—	—	JPN: 1,558	Non-album single
"Last Night"	2024	— (Note: "Last Night" did not enter the Circle Digital Chart, but peaked at number 9 on the download chart.)	—	80	—	—	—	—	—	—	—	—N/a	Pleasure
"Yellow"	2025	— (Note: "Yellow" did not enter the Circle Digital Chart, but peaked at number 9 on the download chart.)	—	22	—	—	—	—	—	—	—	—N/a	Pleasure
"Paradise"	2025	115	—	10	—	—	—	—	—	—	—	—N/a	Love Pulse
"If I"	2026	90	—	11	—	—	—	—	—	—	—	—N/a	New Wav
"Shock"	2026	—	—	20	—	—	—	—	—	—	—	—N/a	Non-album single
"—" denotes releases that did not chart or were not released in that region.

=== Promotional singles ===
List of promotional singles, showing year released and album name
Title	Year	Album
"B.O.M.B" (Kaboom version)	2023	Non-album promotional single

== Soundtrack appearances ==
List of soundtrack appearances, showing year released, with chart positions, sales figures and album name
Title	Year	Peak chart positions		Sales	Album
Title	Year	JPN Hot	US World	Sales	Album
"Beautiful"	2021	58 (Note: The anime edit of "Beautiful", released prior to the full version on January 22, 2021, charted at number 85 on the Billboard Japan Hot 100)	23	—N/a	Black Clover OST and The First Step: Treasure Effect (JP Edition)
"Here I Stand"	2023	1	—	JPN: 1,308	Black Clover: Sword of the Wizard King OST, Here I Stand and Reboot (JP Special Selection)
"Reverse"	2024	—	—	—N/a	Legendary Head Sho OST
"—" denotes releases that did not chart or were not released in that region.

== Other charted songs ==
List of other charted songs, showing year released, with chart positions and album name
Title	Year	Peak chart positions										Album
Title	Year	KOR	IDN	JPN Hot	MLY	PHL	SGP	UK	US World	VIE	WW	Album
"Come to Me" (들어와)	2020	—	—	—	—	—	—	—	10	—	—	The First Step: Treasure Effect
"B.L.T (Bling Like This)"	2020	—	—	—	—	—	—	—	14	—	—	The First Step: Treasure Effect
"Orange" (오렌지)	2020	—	—	—	—	—	—	—	22	—	—	The First Step: Treasure Effect
"U"	2022	—	—	49	—	—	—	—	—	—	—	The Second Step: Chapter One
"Darari" (다라리)	2022	158	2	40	2	8	3	—	—	26	169	The Second Step: Chapter One
"B.O.M.B"	2023	— (Note: "B.O.M.B" did not enter the Circle Digital Chart, but peaked at number 28 on the download chart.)	—	—	—	—	—	— (Note: "B.O.M.B" did not enter the UK Singles Chart, but peaked at number 26 on the Singles Downloads Chart, and number 31 on the Singles Sales Chart.)	—	—	—	Reboot
"Stupid"	2023	— (Note: "Stupid" did not enter the Circle Digital Chart, but peaked at number 38 on the download chart.)	—	— (Note: "Stupid" did not enter the Billboard Japan Hot 100 Chart, but peaked at number 4 on the TikTok Weekly Top 20 with its Japanese version.)	—	—	—	—	—	—	—	Reboot
"—" denotes releases that did not chart or were not released in that region.

== Videography ==
=== Music videos ===
List of music videos, showing year released, directors and length
Year	Title	Director(s)	Ref.
Korean
2020	"Boy"	Rigend Film	
2020	"I Love You" (사랑해)	Rigend Film	
2020	"Mmm" (음)	Seo Hyun-seung	
2021	"My Treasure"	Rigend Film	
2022	"Jikjin" (직진)	Lee Sang-yoon	
2022	"Hello"	Unknown	
2022	"VolKno"	Woong Hui	(Note: Credited as "Treasure", the b-side and its music video consisted of members Choi Hyun-suk, Haruto and Yoshi only)
2023	"Move (T5)"	Jason Kim (Flipevil)	
2023	"Bona Bona"	Gigant	
2024	"King Kong"	Yang Soon-sik (YSS Studio)	
2024	"Last Night"	Yun Joo-yeong (Earthluk, Aedia Studio)	
2025	"Yellow"	Yang Soon-shik (YSS Studio)	
Japanese
2021	"Beautiful"	Junwoo Lee (Salt Film)	

=== Other videos ===
List of others videos, showing year released, directors and length
Year	Title	Director(s)	Ref.
Korean
2020	"Going Crazy" (미쳐가네) (Performance Film)	Unknown	
2020	"Come to Me" (들어와) (Selfie version)	Unknown	
2020	"B.L.T (Bling Like This)" (Selfie version)	Unknown	
2020	"Orange" (오렌지) (Live Video)	Unknown	
2021	"Be With Me" (Happy Halloween Live)	Unknown	
2021	"BFF" (남고괴담 OST) (Happy Christmas version)	Unknown	
2022	"Darari" (다라리) (Remix) (Performance Video)	Unknown	
2023	"B.O.M.B" (Kaboom version) (Dance Performance)	Unknown	
Japanese
2023	"Here I Stand" (Lyric Video)	Unknown	

=== Other releases ===
List of others releases
Title	Details	Ref.
Treasure's 2021 Welcoming Collection	Released: February 24, 2021; Label: YG Entertainment; Formats: DVD	
Treasure 2021 Summer Camp	Released: August 10, 2021; Label: YG Entertainment; Formats: DVD	
Treasure 2022 Welcoming Collection Winter Camp in Everland	Released: March 14, 2022; Label: YG Entertainment; Formats: Digital code card	
