= List of Treasure live performances =

Treasure (band) live performances
- Concert: 1
- Concert tours: 3
- Fanmeeting: 2
- FanConcert: 1
- Music festivals: 14
- Awards shows: 11

The following is a complete list of live performances by South Korean boy band Treasure. The group has gone on three tours, two fan meeting tours, one fan concert tour, as well as performing at numerous music festivals and awards shows.

After their debut, Treasure started their concert Trace (early 2022) in Seoul. Treasure then held their first Asian tour, Hello Tour (late 2022 to mid 2023), along with which they held their Japanese fan meeting tour, Hello Again (late 2023). They started their second Asia tour, the Reboot Tour ( late 2023 to mid 2024), along with which they also held their Japanese fan meeting tour, Wonderland (mid 2024). Treasure held their first fan concert tour, Special Moment (early 2025 to mid 2025), where they also held their first US tour. They also announced their third tour, Pulse On Tour (2025 to 2026). In this tour, they would also be holding their first-ever stadium concert, which will be in Bangkok.

== Concert ==
Date	Title	City	Country	Venue	Ref.
April 9–10, 2022	Trace	Seoul	South Korea	Olympic Hall	

== Concert tours ==
Title	Date(s)	Associated album(s)	Location	Shows	Attendance	Setlist	Ref.
Hello Tour	November 12, 2022 – May 20, 2023	The First Step: Treasure Effect The Second Step: Chapter One The Second Step: Chapter Two	Asia	28	420,000	Setlist for concert in seoul VCR Act1: 1. "Jikjin"; 2. "Boy"; 3. "I Love You"; Act 2 VCR 2: 1. "Going Crazy"; 2. "Come To Me"; 3. "B.L.T (Bling Like This)"; Ment 1: 1. "Slowmotion"; 2. "It's Okay"; Act 3 VCR 3: 1. "Hello"; 2. "Clap!"; Ment 2: 1. "Darari"; Ment 3: 1. "Orange"; 2. "Hold It In"; Ment 4 Act 4: 1. "Thank You" (Asahi x Haruto unit); 2. "VolKno" (Choi Hyun Suk x Yoshi x Haruto unit); 3. "Mmm"; 4. "Rhythm Ta" (original song by iKon); 5. "Bang Bang Bang" (original song by BigBang); Ment 5: 1. "U"; 2. "My Treasure"; Encore: 1. "Everyday"; 2. "BFF(Best Friend Forever)"; 3. "Darari" (Rock remix); 4. "Hello" (Remix ver); 5. "Going Crazy/B.L.T (Bling Like This) / Orange" (Remix ver); Ending Ment	
Reboot Tour	December 15, 2023 –August 15, 2024	Reboot	Asia	29	TBA	Setlist for Finale concert in Seoul (2024) VCR Act1: 1. "Intro+Bona Bona"; 2. "Jikjin"; 3. "Boy" (GDA version); 4. "KIng Kong"; Ment 1: 1. "Hello"; 2. "Stupid"; Act 2 (Units) VCR 2: 1. "Move" (T5); 2. "Medley of Thank you + Thank You" (Asahi x Haruto Unit); 3. "G.O.A.T + Volkno" (Rap Unit); 4. "Intro + "Mmm"" (Rock version); 5. "The Way To" (Vocal unit); 6. "Orange"; 7. "Hold It In"; Special Act~CL (only for Reboot Finale in Seoul): 1. "The Baddest Female"; 2. "MTBD"; Act 3 VCR 3: 1. "Wonderland"; 2. "B.O.M.B"; Ment: 1. "I Want Your Love"; 2. "I Love You"; Encore: 1. "Run"; 2. "Going Crazy"; 3. "Darari" (Rock remix); 4. "My Treasure"; 5. "Clap!"; Ending Ment Re-Encore: 1. "Everyday"; 2. "B.L.T(Bling Like This); 3. "I Want Your Love"	
Pulse On Tour	October 10, 2025 - May 30, 2026	Love Pulse	Asia	27	TBA	Setlist for 3rd night in seoul (2025) VCR Act1: 1. "Intro + "Mmm"" (Rock version); 2. "King Kong" (MAMA Version); 3. "Bona Bona"; 4. "Boy"; 5. "Jikjin" (Rearranged version); Ment 1 Act 2 (Units): 1. "Move" (T5); 2. "Medley of Thank you + Thank You" (Asahi x Haruto Unit); 3. "2024 MAMA Rap + Volkno Ver 2" (Rap Unit); Act 3: 1. "Yellow"; 2. "Come To Me"; 3. "Saruru"; Treasure Dance Challenge Act 4 VCR 2: 1. "Better Than Me"; 2. "Now Forever"; 3. "Paradise"; 4. "Everything"; Ment 2: 1. "B.L.T (Bling Like This)"; 2. "Hello"; Ment 3: 1. "I Want Your Love"; 2. "Run"; Encore: 1. "BFF (Best Friend Forever)"; 2. "Everyday"; 3. "U"; 4. "Clap"; Ment 4: 1. "Darari" (Rock remix); 2. "B.O.M.B / I Love You / Last Night / Going Crazy / Stupid / Now Forever " ( Remix ver); Ending Ment 5 Re-Encore: 1. "Paradise"; 2. "Mmm"; 3. "I Want Your Love"; Ending VCR	

== Fanmeeting ==
Title	Date(s)	Location	Shows	Attendance
Hello Again	September 2, 2023 – November 12, 2023	Japan	20	TBA
Wonderland	July 6, 2024 – August 11, 2024	Japan	24	170,000

== FanConcert ==
Title	Date(s)	Associated album(s)	Location	Shows	Attendance	Setlist	Ref.
Special Moment	March 28, 2025 – May 18, 2025	Pleasure	Asia North America	17	TBA	Setlist for seoul concerts VCR Act1: 1. "Yellow"; 2. "Saruru"; 3. "Don't Flirt" (Original song by Winner) (covered by Jihoon x Junkyu x Jaehyuk x Asahi x Doyoung x Jeongwoo x Junghwan); 4. "Don't Leave" + "High High" (Original song by GD x TOP) (covered by Hyunsuk x Yoshi x Haruto); Ment 1 Act 2: 1. "Bad Boy" (Original song by BigBang) (covered by Yoshi x Junkyu x Jaehyuk x Asahi x Haruto x Jeongwoo); 2. "Thank You"(Original song by Asahi x Haruto) (covered by Doyoung x Junghwan); 3. "Move"(Original song by T5) (Covered by Hyunsuk x Yoshi x Asahi x Haruto x Jeongwoo); 4. "Volkno"(Original song by Hyunsuk x Yoshi x Haruto) (Covered by Jihoon x Junkyu x Jaehyuk); 5. "Kill This Love" (Original song by Blackpink) (Covered by Hyunsuk x Jihoon x Doyoung x Junghwan); Ment 2: 1. "Bang Bang Bang"(Original song by BigBang); 2. "Fantastic Baby"(Original song by BigBang); Act 3 Dance Challenge (Audience): 1. "KIng Kong"; 2. "Jikjin"; Ment 2: 1. "Last night" 2. "Darari" (Rock remix); 3. "Run"; Encore: 1. "Yellow"; Ending Ment Setlist for US concerts Act1: 1. "Intro + Jikjin"; 2. "Bona Bona"; 3. "Boy" (GDA ver); 4. "I Love You"; Ment 1 Act 2: 1. "Thank You"(Asahi x Haruto unit); 2. "Move"(T5); 3. "G.O.A.T" + "Volkno"(Hyunsuk x Yoshi x Haruto unit); 4. "[[Mmm](Treasure song)|Mmm]]"; Band (Interlude) Act 3: 1. "Yellow"; 2. "Saruru"; Ment 2: 1. "King Kong"; 2. "I Want Your Love"; 3. "B.O.M.B"; Ment 3: 1. "Hello"; 2. "Darari" (rock remix); 3. "Run"; Encore: 1. "Going crazy/B.L.T(Bling Like This)/ Orange" (Remix); Ending Ment	
The Stage 2026	19 June, 2026 - 6 September, 2026	New Wav	Asia	18	TBA		

== Music festivals ==
Event	Date	Venue	City	Country	Performed song(s)	Ref
Saranghaeyo Indonesia 2022	December 10, 2022	Istora Senayan	Jakarta	Indonesia	"Hello"; "Darari rock remix"; "Jikjin"; "Boy"; "My Treasure "; "Mmm "; "I Love You"	
Waterbomb Nagoya 2023	July 22, 2023	Aichi Sky Expo Multipurpose Site	Nagoya	Japan	"Hello"; "Boy"; "Jikjin"; "I Love You"; "Mmm rock ver"; "Darari rock remix"; "Going Crazy"/ "Bling Like This" / "Orange" remix ver	
Summer Sonic Festival	August 19, 2023	Maishima Sports Island	Osaka	Japan	"Jikjin"; "Bona Bona"; "Mmm"; "Hello"; "Darari"; "Here I Stand"; "Going Crazy/ Bling Like This/ Orange Remix ver"	
M Countdown In France	October 15, 2023	Paris La Défense Arena	Paris	France	"Jikjin"; "Bona Bona"	
K-Link Festival	December 10, 2023	Jamsil Arena	Seoul	South Korea	"Bona bona"; "Jikjin"; "Mmm (Rock ver)"; "Darari (Rock remix)"	
Tone & Music Festival 2024	June 16, 2024	Olympic Park	Seoul	South Korea	"King Kong"; "Jikjin"; "I Want Your Love"; "B.o.m.b"; "Mmm (Rock ver)"; "Run"; "Hello"; "Darari (Rock remix)"; "I Want Your Love (encore)"	
Waterbomb Busan 2024	July 27, 2024	North Port Waterfront Park	Busan	South Korea	"King Kong"; "Jikjin"	
SBS Gayo Daejeon Winter	December 25, 2024	Inspire Arena	Incheon	South Korea	"Last Night"	
2025 Weverse Con Festival	May 31, 2025	Inspire Arena	Incheon	South Korea	"King Kong"; "I Want Your Love"; "Yellow"; "Saruru"; "Run"; "Darari"	
Allo Bank Festival 2025	June 22, 2025	Istora Senayan	Jakarta	Indonesia	"Opening + King Kong"; "Jikjin"; "Last Night"; "Yellow"; Saruru"; "B.o.m.b"; "Run"; "Darari (Rock remix)"; "Saruru (encore)"	
Show! Music Core in Japan	July 6, 2025	Belluna Dome	Saitama	Japan	"Yellow"; "Saruru"; "Here I Stand"; "Run"	
Summer Sonic Festival	August 16, 2025	Osaka Expo 70 Memorial Park	Osaka	Japan	"Mmm rock ver"; "I Want Your Love"; "King Kong"; "Jikjin"; "Here I Stand"; "Hello"; "Run"; "Darari rock remix"	
A-Nation	August 30, 2025	Ajinomoto Stadium	Tokyo	Japan	"King Kong"; "Jikjin"; "Everything"; "Hello"; "I Want Your Love"; "Here I Stand"; "Let It Burn"; "Run"	
SBS Gayo Daejeon	December 25, 2025	Inspire Arena	Incheon	South Korea	"Paradise" (Remix Ver); "Run" (Band Ver)	
MyK Festa	June 26, 2026	Kintex Hall 1	Goyang	South Korea	TBA	
Busan One Asia Festival	June 27, 2026	Busan Asiad Main Stadium	Busan	South Korea	TBA	
KCON LA	August 14, 2026	Crypto.com Arena	Los Angeles	California	TBA	

== Awards shows ==
List of performances, showing dates, location, and relevant informations
Event	Dates	Venue	City	Country	Performed song(s)	Ref(s)
2020 Mnet Asian Music Awards	December 6, 2020	CJ ENM Contents World	Paju	South Korea	"Boy"; "I Love You"; "MMM"	
36th Golden Disc Awards	January 10, 2021	Gocheok Sky Dome	Seoul	South Korea	"I Love You"; "Boy"; "Going Crazy"	
2022 MAMA Awards	November 30, 2022	Kyocera Dome Osaka	Osaka	Japan	"Volkno"; "Jikjin"; "Hello"	
7th Asia Artist Awards	December 13, 2022	Nippon Gaishi Hall	Nagoya	Japan	"Volkno x Good Boy"; "Jikjin"; "Hello"	
37th Golden Disc Awards	January 7, 2023	Rajamangala National Stadium	Bangkok	Thailand	"Boy"; "Jikjin"; "Darari"	
2023 K-Global Heart Dream Awards	August 10, 2023	KSPO Dome	Seoul	South Korea	"Move (T5 song)"	
2023 MAMA Awards	November 29, 2023	Tokyo Dome	Tokyo	Japan	"Move (T5)"; "Bona Bona"	
2024 Korea Grand Music Awards	November 17, 2024	Inspire Arena	Incheon	South Korea	"I Want Your Love"; "Mmm"	
2024 MAMA Awards	November 22, 2024	Kyocera Dome Osaka	Osaka	Japan	"King Kong"; "Run"	
TMElive International Music Awards	August 23. 2025	Galaxy Macau Arena	Macau	China	"King Kong"; "Jikjin"; "I Want Your Love"; "Bomb (Kaboom ver)"; "Hello"	
2025 MAMA Awards	November 28, 2025	Kai Tak Stadium	Hong Kong	China	"2025 Free"; "Paradise" (Remix ver); "I Want Your Love" (Band ver)	
