= List of awards and nominations received by Treasure =

Treasure awards and nominations
- Treasure in April 2023; L-R from the top: Doyoung, Choi Hyun-suk, Yoon Jae-hyuk, Jihoon, Yoshi, Park Jeong-woo, So Jung-hwan, Haruto, Asahi, Junkyu
Awards and nominations
Award	Wins	Nominations
APAN Music Awards	1	2
Asia Artist Awards	2	7
Asia Star Entertainer Awards	3	3
Asian Pop Music Awards	2	8
Brand Customer Loyalty Awards	2	2
Brand of the Year Awards	1	2
Circle Chart Music Awards	0	10
D Awards	2	4
The Fact Music Awards	4	11
Golden Disc Awards	2	8
Hanteo Music Awards	1	20
Indonesian Hallyu Fans Choice Awards	1	1
Japan Gold Disc Award	1	1
Joox Thailand Music Awards	1	2
K-Global Heart Dream Awards	1	5
Korea First Brand Awards	1	3
Korea Grand Music Awards	6	6
MAMA Awards	7	19
Melon Music Awards	0	1
MTV Europe Music Awards	0	1
Mubeat Awards	1	14
Seoul Music Awards	1	19
Tencent Music Entertainment Awards	2	2
Tokopedia WIB Indonesia K-Pop Awards	1	1

Totals (Note: Certain award groups do not simply award one winner. They acknowledge several different recipients, have runners-up, and have third place. Since this is a specific recognition and is different from losing an award, runner-up mentions are considered wins in this award tally. For simplification and to avoid errors, each award in this list has been presumed to have had a prior nomination.)
- Wins: 43
- Nominations: 152

Treasure is a South Korean boy band under YG Entertainment, formed through the reality program YG Treasure Box (2018–2019). Debuted in August 2020, the band consists of ten members: Choi Hyun-suk, Jihoon, Yoshi, Junkyu, Yoon Jae-hyuk, Asahi, Doyoung, Haruto, Park Jeong-woo, and So Jung-hwan.

== Awards and nominations ==
Name of the award ceremony, year presented, award category, nominee(s) of the award, and the result of the nomination
Award ceremony	Year	Category	Nominee(s)/work(s)	Result	Ref.
APAN Music Awards	2020	New Wave Award (Male)	Treasure	Won	
APAN Music Awards	2020	Best Male Group (Global)	Treasure	Nominated	
Asia Artist Awards	2020	Rookie of the Year – Male Singer	Treasure	Won	
Asia Artist Awards	2020	Popularity Award – Male Singer	Treasure	Longlisted	
Asia Artist Awards	2021	Popularity Award – Male Singer	Treasure	Nominated	
Asia Artist Awards	2022	Best Musician Award	Treasure	Won	
Asia Artist Awards	2022	Popularity Award – Male Singer	Treasure	Nominated	
Asia Artist Awards	2023	Popularity Award – Male Singer	Treasure	Nominated	
Asia Artist Awards	2024	Popularity Award – Male Singer	Treasure	Nominated	
Asia Star Entertainer Awards	2024	Best Touring	Treasure	Won	
Asia Star Entertainer Awards	2024	Best Hip-Hop	Treasure	Won	
Asia Star Entertainer Awards	2024	Platinum Worldwide Star	Treasure	Won	
Asian Pop Music Awards	2020	Best New Artist (Overseas)	Treasure	Nominated	
Asian Pop Music Awards	2022	Best Group (Overseas)	Treasure	Nominated	
Asian Pop Music Awards	2022	Top 20 Albums of the Year (Overseas)	The Second Step: Chapter One	Won	
Asian Pop Music Awards	2022	Best Dance Performance (Overseas)	"Jikjin"	Nominated	
Asian Pop Music Awards	2022	Record of the Year (Overseas)	"Jikjin"	Nominated	
Asian Pop Music Awards	2025	Best Group	Treasure	Nominated	
Asian Pop Music Awards	2025	Best Dance Performance	"Now Forever"	Nominated	
Asian Pop Music Awards	2025	Top 20 Songs Of The Year	"Yellow"	Won	
Brand Customer Loyalty Awards	2021	Best Male Rookie Award	Treasure	Won	
Brand Customer Loyalty Awards	2022	Male Idol Rising Star Award	Treasure	Won	
Brand of the Year Awards	2021	Rookie Male Idol	Treasure	Won	
Brand of the Year Awards	2022	Male Idol of the Year (Daesang)	Treasure	Nominated	
Circle Chart Music Awards	2021	Mubeat Global Choice Award (Male)	Treasure	Shortlisted	
Circle Chart Music Awards	2021	New Artist of the Year (Physical)	The First Step: Chapter One	Nominated	
Circle Chart Music Awards	2022	Album of the Year – 1st Quarter	The First Step: Treasure Effect	Nominated	
Circle Chart Music Awards	2022	Mubeat Global Choice Award (Male)	Treasure	Nominated	
Circle Chart Music Awards	2023	Album of the Year – 1st Quarter	The Second Step: Chapter One	Nominated	
Circle Chart Music Awards	2023	Song of the Year – February	"Jikjin"	Nominated	
Circle Chart Music Awards	2023	Song of the Year – February	"Darari"	Nominated	
Circle Chart Music Awards	2023	Mubeat Global Choice Award (Male)	Treasure	Nominated	
Circle Chart Music Awards	2023	Idolplus Global Artist Award	Treasure	Nominated	
Circle Chart Music Awards	2024	Mubeat Global Choice Award (Male)	Treasure	Nominated	
D Awards	2025	Delights Blue Award	Treasure	Won	
D Awards	2025	Best Tour	Treasure	Won	
D Awards	2025	Best Popularity Award – Boy Group	Treasure	Nominated	
D Awards	2026	Best Popularity Award - Boy Group	Treasure	Nominated	
The Fact Music Awards	2020	Fan N Star Choice Award (Artist)	Treasure	Nominated	
The Fact Music Awards	2020	TMA Popularity Award (Artist)	Treasure	Nominated	
The Fact Music Awards	2021	Fan N Star Choice Award (Artist)	Treasure	Nominated	
The Fact Music Awards	2021	U+ Idol Live Popularity Award	Treasure	Nominated	
The Fact Music Awards	2022	Fan N Star Choice Award (Artist)	Treasure	Nominated	
The Fact Music Awards	2022	Artist of the Year (Bonsang)	Treasure	Won	
The Fact Music Awards	2022	Four Star Awards	Treasure	Nominated	
The Fact Music Awards	2022	Idolplus Popularity Award	Treasure	Nominated	
The Fact Music Awards	2023	Artist of the Year (Bonsang)	Treasure	Won	
The Fact Music Awards	2023	Best Music – Fall	"Bona Bona"	Nominated	
The Fact Music Awards	2023	Idolplus Popularity Award	Treasure	Nominated	
The Fact Music Awards	2026	Artist of Year (Bonsang)	Treasure	Won	
The Fact Music Awards	2026	World Best Performer	Treasure	Won	
Golden Disc Awards	2021	Rookie Artist of the Year	Treasure	Won	
Golden Disc Awards	2021	Curaprox Popularity Award	Treasure	Nominated	
Golden Disc Awards	2021	QQ Music Popularity Award	Treasure	Nominated	
Golden Disc Awards	2023	Best Album (Bonsang)	The Second Step: Chapter One	Nominated	
Golden Disc Awards	2023	Best Group	Treasure	Won	
Golden Disc Awards	2023	TikTok Golden Disc Most Popular Artist	Treasure	Nominated	
Golden Disc Awards	2024	Best Album (Bonsang)	Reboot	Nominated	
Golden Disc Awards	2024	Bugs Most Popular Male Artist Award	Treasure	Nominated	
Hanteo Music Awards	2021	Artist Award — Male Group	Treasure	Nominated	
Hanteo Music Awards	2021	WhosFandom Award	Treasure Maker	Won	
Hanteo Music Awards	2023	Artist of the Year Main Prize	Treasure	Nominated	
Hanteo Music Awards	2023	Global Artist in Japan	Treasure	Nominated	
Hanteo Music Awards	2023	WhosFandom Award	Treasure Maker	Nominated	
Hanteo Music Awards	2024	Artist of the Year Main Prize	Treasure	Nominated	
Hanteo Music Awards	2024	Global Artist Award	Treasure	Nominated	
Hanteo Music Awards	2024	Post Generation Award	Treasure	Nominated	
Hanteo Music Awards	2024	WhosFandom Award	Treasure Maker	Nominated	
Hanteo Music Awards	2025	WhosFandom Award	Treasure Maker	Nominated	
Hanteo Music Awards	2026	Artists Of The Year (Bonsang)	Treasure	Nominated	
Hanteo Music Awards	2026	Best Continent Artist -Africa	Treasure	Nominated	
Hanteo Music Awards	2026	Best Continent Artist - Asia	Treasure	Nominated	
Hanteo Music Awards	2026	Best Continent Artist - Europe	Treasure	Nominated	
Hanteo Music Awards	2026	Best Continent Artist -North America	Treasure	Nominated	
Hanteo Music Awards	2026	Best Continent Artist -Oceania	Treasure	Nominated	
Hanteo Music Awards	2026	Best Continent Artist -South America	Treasure	Nominated	
Hanteo Music Awards	2026	Best Popular Artist	Treasure	Nominated	
Hanteo Music Awards	2026	Best Global Popular Artist	Treasure	Nominated	
Hanteo Music Awards	2026	WhosFandom Award	Treasure Maker	Nominated	
Indonesian Hallyu Fans Choice Awards	2021	Boy Group Song of the Year	"My Treasure"	Won	
Japan Gold Disc Award	2022	Best 3 New Artists (Asia)	Treasure	Won	
Joox Thailand Music Awards	2021	Favourite K-Pop Rookie Artist of 2020	Treasure	Won	
Joox Thailand Music Awards	2022	Top Social Global Artist of the Year	Treasure	Nominated	
K-Global Heart Dream Awards (Note: Hosted by the Awards Organizing Committee, Celeb Media, and YJ Partners and sponsored by Sports Today, the K Global Heart Dream Awards honors K-pop artists at the center of world culture as part of the Hallyu Wave.)	2022	Popularity Award - Male Group	Treasure	Nominated	
K-Global Heart Dream Awards	2023	K Global Best Unit Award (Treasure's T5)	Treasure	Won	
K-Global Heart Dream Awards	2023	Popularity Award - Male Group	Treasure	Nominated	
K-Global Heart Dream Awards	2023	4th Generation Hot Icon Male Group	Treasure	Nominated	
K-Global Heart Dream Awards	2024	UPICK Popularity Award - Boy Group	Treasure	Nominated	
Korea First Brand Awards (Note: The Korea First Brand Awards is hosted by the Korea Consumer Brand Committee and the Korea Consumer Forum. Awards are based on a nationwide survey held in South Korea.)	2021	Best Rookie Idol (Male)	Treasure	Won	
Korea First Brand Awards	2022	Male Idol Rising Star Award	Treasure	Nominated	
Korea First Brand Awards	2023	Most Anticipated Unit Award (Treasure's T5)	Treasure	Nominated	
Korea Grand Music Awards	2024	Best 10 Songs	"King Kong"	Won	
Korea Grand Music Awards	2024	Best 10 Artists	Treasure	Nominated	
Korea Grand Music Awards	2024	Best Stage Award	Treasure	Won	
Korea Grand Music Awards	2024	Trend of the Year	Treasure	Nominated	
Korea Grand Music Awards	2025	Best Music 10	"Love Pulse"	Nominated	
Korea Grand Music Awards	2025	Trend of the Year - K-pop Group	Treasure	Nominated	
Korea Grand Music Awards	2026	Best Artist (Bonsang)	Treasure	Won	
Korea Grand Music Awards	2026	Grand Song (Daesang)	Treasure	Won	
Korea Grand Music Awards	2026	Best Hip - Hop	Treasure	Won	
Korea Grand Music Awards	2026	Trend of Year (Group)	Treasure	Won	
MAMA Awards	2020	Best New Male Artist	Treasure	Won	
MAMA Awards	2020	Worldwide Fans' Choice Top 10	Treasure	Won	
MAMA Awards	2020	Artist of the Year	Treasure	Longlisted	
MAMA Awards	2021	Worldwide Fans' Choice Top 10	Treasure	Won	
MAMA Awards	2021	TikTok Favorite Moment	Treasure	Nominated	
MAMA Awards	2022	Worldwide Fans' Choice Top 10	Treasure	Won	
MAMA Awards	2022	Best Dance Performance – Male Group	"Jikjin"	Nominated	
MAMA Awards	2022	Song of the Year	"Jikjin"	Nominated	
MAMA Awards	2023	Artist of the Year	Treasure	Nominated	
MAMA Awards	2023	Best Male Group	Treasure	Nominated	
MAMA Awards	2023	Worldwide Fans' Choice Top 10	Treasure	Nominated	
MAMA Awards	2023	Album of the Year	Reboot	Nominated	
MAMA Awards	2023	Galaxy Neo Flip Artist	Treasure	Won	
MAMA Awards	2023	Favorite Dance Performance – Male Group	Treasure	Won	
MAMA Awards	2024	Favorite Male Group	Treasure	Won	
MAMA Awards	2024	Worldwide Fans' Choice Top 10	Treasure	Nominated	
MAMA Awards	2025	Worldwide Fans' Choice Top 10	Treasure	Nominated	
MAMA Awards	2025	Best Vocal Performance - Group	"Yellow"	Nominated	
MAMA Awards	2025	Song Of The Year	"Yellow"	Nominated	
Melon Music Awards	2020	Best New Artist Award (Male)	Treasure	Nominated	
MTV Europe Music Awards	2023	Best Asia Act	Treasure	Nominated	
Mubeat Awards (Note: The Mubeat Awards is an awards ceremony in which fans from across the globe vote directly on the global K-pop platform Mubeat for select categories.)	2020	Rookie Artist - Male	Treasure	Won	
Mubeat Awards	2020	Artist of the Year	Treasure	Nominated	
Mubeat Awards	2020	Song of the Year	"Boy"	Nominated	
Mubeat Awards	2020	Music Video of the Year	"I Love You"	Nominated	
Mubeat Awards	2021	Artist of the Year	Treasure	Nominated	
Mubeat Awards	2022	Artist of the Year	Treasure	Nominated	
Mubeat Awards	2022	Song of the Year	"Jikjin"	Nominated	
Mubeat Awards	2022	Music Video of the Year	"Jikjin"	Nominated	
Mubeat Awards	2022	Best Group of the Year	Treasure	Nominated	
Mubeat Awards	2022	Global Pick Artist	Treasure	Nominated	
Mubeat Awards	2023	Artist of the Year	Treasure	Nominated	
Mubeat Awards	2023	Song of the Year	"Bona Bona"	Nominated	
Mubeat Awards	2023	Music Video of the Year	"Bona Bona"	Nominated	
Mubeat Awards	2023	Stage Stealer	"Bona Bona"	Nominated	
Seoul Music Awards	2021	Rookie of the Year	Treasure	Won	
Seoul Music Awards	2021	Fan PD Artist Award	Treasure	Nominated	
Seoul Music Awards	2021	K-Wave Award	Treasure	Nominated	
Seoul Music Awards	2021	Popularity Award	Treasure	Nominated	
Seoul Music Awards	2021	WhosFandom Award	Treasure	Nominated	
Seoul Music Awards	2022	Main Award (Bonsang)	Treasure	Nominated	
Seoul Music Awards	2022	Popularity Award	Treasure	Nominated	
Seoul Music Awards	2022	K-Wave Award	Treasure	Nominated	
Seoul Music Awards	2022	U+Idol Live Best Artist Award	Treasure	Nominated	
Seoul Music Awards	2023	Main Award (Bonsang)	Treasure	Nominated	
Seoul Music Awards	2023	Popularity Award	Treasure	Nominated	
Seoul Music Awards	2023	Hallyu Special Award	Treasure	Nominated	
Seoul Music Awards	2024	Main Award (Bonsang)	Treasure	Nominated	
Seoul Music Awards	2024	Popularity Award	Treasure	Nominated	
Seoul Music Awards	2024	Hallyu Special Award	Treasure	Nominated	
Seoul Music Awards	2025	Main Prize (Bonsang)	Treasure	Nominated	
Seoul Music Awards	2025	Popularity Award	Treasure	Nominated	
Seoul Music Awards	2025	K-Wave Special Award	Treasure	Nominated	
Seoul Music Awards	2025	K-pop World Choice – Group	Treasure	Nominated	
Tencent Music Entertainment Awards	2023	New Influence Overseas Group of the Year	Treasure	Won	
Tencent Music Entertainment Awards	2025	Top 10 Korean EPs Of The Year	Pleasure	Won	
Tokopedia WIB Indonesia K-Pop Awards	2021	The Most Mood Booster	style="background: #9EFF9E; color: #000; vertical-align: middle; text-align: center; " class="yes table-yes2 notheme"|Won		

== Other accolades ==
=== Listicles ===
Name of publisher, year listed, name of listicle, and placement
Publisher	Year	Listicle	Placement	Ref.
Forbes	2021	Korea Power Celebrity (Rising Star)	Placed	
