= Jikjin =

Single by Treasure

from the EP The Second Step: Chapter One
- Language: Korean; Japanese
- Released: February 15, 2022
- Recorded: 2022
- Studio: YG (Seoul)
- Genre: Hip-hop
- Length: 3:05
- Label: YG; YGEX
- Composers: Choice37; LP; Sonny; Future Bounce; HAE; Se.A; Choi Hyun-suk; Yoshi; Haruto
- Lyricists: Sonny; LIL G; Choice37; LP; HAE; Choi Hyun-suk; Yoshi; Haruto; Se.A
- Producers: Choice37; Future Bounce; LP

Treasure singles chronology
"Beautiful" (2021)	"Jikjin" (2022)	"Hello" (2022)

Music video
- "Jikjin" on YouTube

"Jikjin" (직진; Jikjin; '"Straight"') is a song recorded by South Korean boy band Treasure for their first EP, The Second Step: Chapter One. It was released on February 15, 2022, by their agency, YG Entertainment and it was distributed by their in-house distribution company YG Plus.

The song was originally released in Korean, while the Japanese version was included in the Japanese version of the EP. It is the last single to feature members Bang Ye-dam and Mashiho before their hiatus from the group and subsequent departure.

== Background ==
Treasure concluded their The First Step series with their first studio album was released on January 11, 2021, with lead singles "My Treasure" and "Beautiful" (for the Japanese version).

On January 1, 2022, YG announced that Treasure would have a comeback that year. The title track "Jikjin" was first revealed on January 25, with YG stating it was the group's most powerful song yet. A visual film showing the concept of the title track was revealed on the 26th. On January 27, YG uploaded some parts of the song's lyrics on four types of posters featuring members Junkyu, Mashiho, Yoon Jae-hyuk, and So Jung-hwan. The second and the third batch of the four lyrics posters was uploaded on the next two days and revealing the song would be released alongside the EP on February 15. A part of the song's melody was unveiled for the first time alongside 10-seconds visual film on January 30 and 31, despite four members tested positive for COVID-19.

The uploads of the visual films continued on February 1 with a complete teaser video released on the next day. On February 9, the song's point choreography was shown on YG's blog. The song and its music video was officially released on February 15.

== Composition ==
"Jikjin" is an energetic hip-hop song which features a constant switch between the music and the vocal parts to enhance the atmosphere over a minimalist chorus. The ending of the song was described to be "thrilling" to evoke a sensation of hitting and speed.

The song was produced by YG producers Choice37, Future Bounce, and LP with members Choi Hyun-suk, Yoshi, and Haruto participating in penning the rap lyrics. It was composed in the key of C Major with a tempo of 130 beats per minute.

Choi revealed he first listened to the song in October 2021 and described it as a "YG" and "Treasure-like" song, with So commenting the song was like a "perfect clothes."

== Music video ==
The music video for "Jikjin" was released on February 15. Directed by Lee Sang-yoon, YG revealed that they had invested heavily for the music video which cost ₩500 million for the supercars featured on the video. The music video surpassed 10 million views within 21 hours since its release. On the 20th, a "stage" version of the music video was released.

== Live performances ==
Treasure appeared on M Countdown on February 24, where they performed "Jikjin" and "U".

The song was included in the group's setlist for their first live Asia Tour, "Treasure Tour: Hello" in 2022, and "Reboot" in 2023–24.

== Charts ==
=== Weekly charts ===
Chart performance for "Jikjin"
Chart (2022)	Peak position
Indonesia Songs (Billboard)	1
Japan Hot 100 (Billboard Japan)	21
Malaysia (RIM)	13
Malaysia Songs (Billboard)	1
Philippines Songs (Billboard Philippines)	7
Singapore Top Regional (RIAS)	25
South Korea (Gaon)	69
Vietnam Hot 100 (Billboard Vietnam)	41
US Global 200 (Billboard)	110

== Accolades ==
Music program awards for Jikjin
Program	Date
Show Champion (MBC M)	February 23, 2022
Music Bank (KBS)	February 25, 2022

== Release history ==
Release history for "Jikjin"
Region	Date	Version	Format	Label	Ref
Various	February 15, 2022	Korean	Digital download; streaming	YG; YG Plus	
Various	March 15, 2022	Japanese	Digital download; streaming	YGEX	
