= My Treasure =

Single by Treasure

from the album The First Step: Treasure Effect
- Language: Korean; Japanese
- Released: January 11, 2021
- Recorded: 2020
- Studio: YG (Seoul)
- Genre: Dance-pop
- Length: 3:15
- Label: YG; YGEX
- Composers: Future Bounce; Aftrshok; Geist Way; CSCS; H.Kenneth; Pollock
- Lyricists: Bigtone; Min Yeon-jae; Choi Hyun-suk; Haruto; Yoshi; Zero (Yves & Adams) (JP)
- Producers: Future Bounce; Aftrshok

Treasure singles chronology
| "Mmm" (2020) | "My Treasure" (2021) | "Beautiful" (2021) |

Music video
- "My Treasure" on YouTube

"My Treasure" is a song recorded by South Korean boy band Treasure that was released on January 11, 2021, by YG Entertainment and distributed by their in-house distribution company YG Plus as the lead single for their debut studio album, The First Step: Treasure Effect. The song was originally released in Korean, with the Japanese version included in the Japanese version of the album.

Production duo Future Bounce is credited as the producer of the song alongside Aftrshok. They collaborated with Geist Way, CSCS, H.Kenneth, and Pollock in composing the music. Treasure members Choi Hyun-suk, Haruto, and Yoshi wrote the lyrics to the track with Bigtone and Min Yeon-jae. Zero (Yves & Adams) is credited along with the former five as lyricists for the Japanese version.

The song would later charted in Billboard Japan's Hot 100 chart.

== Background ==
Throughout 2020, Treasure has been releasing single albums for their First Step series, which includes their debut single, "Boy", "I Love You", and "Mmm".

On January 4, 2021, YG revealed the track list for Treasure's debut studio album,The First Step: Treasure Effect where "My Treasure" is announced as the title track. On the following day, YG posted three lyric posters of the song in which members So Jung-hwan, Choi Hyun-suk, and Yoon Jae-hyuk appeared. On January 6, YG posted the second lyric posters featuring Asahi, Doyoung, and Jihoon, showing the three members smiling against a blue background. YG added that the lyrics are a message to stand strong together in difficult times. The next day on January 7, lyric posters featuring Bang Ye-dam, Haruto, and Yoshi were uploaded. The final key lyrics were posted on January 8, featuring Park Jeong-woo, Mashiho, and Junkyu.

Two days before the comeback, YG uploaded a 35-second teaser video showing the concept for the eventual music video. The full song was released on January 11, along with the album and its accompanying music video.

== Composition ==
"My Treasure" is a cheerful song with funky energy. The song is considered as the band's first bright pop genre as the previous releases were leaning to electronic sounds. Its warm lyrics were penned by Treasure members Choi Hyun-suk, Haruto, and Yoshi, co-written with Bigtone, Min Yeon-jae, and Zero for the Japanese version. The song is composed by Future Bounce, Aftrshok, Geist Way, CSCS, H.Kenneth, and Pollock in the key of F major with a tempo of 128 beats per minute.

At the press conference of the album's release, Doyoung stated that the members found the song fresh and invigorating and added that the band wanted to send positive energy to the listeners. Choi who's involved in writing the lyrics added that the members were actively involved in the production process.

== Music video ==
The music video for "My Treasure" was released on January 11. According to Junkyu, the music video uses fantastical visual elements to enlighten the viewers. 13 hours after the upload, the video already reached 3.5 million viewers on YouTube. On January 13, YG uploaded the behind-the-scenes of the music video filming.

== Promotion and live performances ==
Treasure debuted "My Treasure" on M Countdown on January 14, in which they also performed their pre-debut song, "Going Crazy". On the 17th, Treasure performed the song on Inkigayo.

The song was featured on the band's debut tour, Hello and as an encore at their sophomore tour, Reboot.

== Commercial performance ==
"My Treasure" debuted and peaked on Billboard Japan's Hot 100 chart on no. 54.

== Charts ==
=== Weekly charts ===
Chart performance for "My Treasure"
| Chart (2021) | Peak position |
|---|---|
| Japan Hot 100 (Billboard Japan) | 54 |
| South Korea Downloads (Gaon) | 20 |

== Release history ==
Release history for "My Treasure"
| Region | Date | Version | Format | Label | Ref |
|---|---|---|---|---|---|
| Various | January 11, 2021 | Korean | Digital download; streaming | YG; YG Plus | — |
| Various | March 9, 2021 | Japanese | Digital download; streaming | YGEX | |
