= The First Step: Chapter Three =

2020 single album by Treasure

- Digital cover

Single album by Treasure
- Released: November 6, 2020
- Studio: YG (Seoul)
- Genre: hip hop; lo-fi; rap; trap
- Length: 7:44 (Digital); 15:28 (Physical)
- Language: Korean; English
- Label: YG; YG Plus
- Producer: Future Bounce; AFTRSHOK; Czaer

Treasure chronology
The First Step: Chapter Two (2020)	The First Step: Chapter Three (2020)	The First Step: Treasure Effect (2021)

Singles from The First Step: Chapter Three
- 1. "Mmm" Released: November 6, 2020

The First Step: Chapter Three is the third single album by South Korean boy band Treasure. It was released as the follow-up to The First Step: Chapter Two on November 6, 2020, through YG Entertainment and distributed through YG Plus. The single album was released for pre-order on 27 October. The single album was produced by Aftrshok, Czaer and Future Bounce. The First Step: Chapter Three is primarily a rap/hip hop record with lo-fi and trap elements.

== Background ==
On October 26, 2020, it was confirmed that Treasure would release their third single album on November 6, three months since their debut and 49 days since the release of their second single album, The First Step: Chapter Two. On October 27, the concept video for the album was uploaded. A 35-second clip, the 12 members were presented and gave a hint on the album concept. Pre-orders for the album began on October 27. On October 28, the title poster for the album was revealed. On October 29, the track list for the album was revealed. The album will contain a total of four tracks, including two new songs and their instrumental versions. Members Yoshi, Choi Hyun-suk and Haruto were credited as writers, while Asahi was credited as not only the writer but also as a composer for the first time. Starting from November 2, the group revealed 18 seconds of the dance clip of the lead single "Mmm" five times every midnight, revealing half the song, which is approximately 1 minute and 30 seconds, prior to the release of the album. Individual member posters were uploaded from November 2 to November 3. On November 5, a concept video and poster of "Mmm" were uploaded.

On November 19, a "coming soon" poster with artwork drawn by Asahi was uploaded, teasing the live performance video of "Orange".

== Composition ==
According to YG Entertainment, "Mmm" is "a song in typical hip hop genre with a BPM of 80", which is "slower than the previous releases, but it will be a song sending off a stronger impression”. Same as Treasure's two previous single albums, The First Step: Chapter One and The First Step: Chapter Two, the song's main theme is "the emotions of a boy who fell in love". In the countdown live held by the group on November 6, 2020, the song is described as "a hybrid trap song with a strong groove". The group voiced their desire to "present hip hop in a young mood" through the song. In particular, member Choi Hyun-suk stated that he "express[ed] [his] thoughts and emotions of [his] 20s" through the lyrics of the song.

"Orange" is a "ballad genre song which emphasizes emotions of newtro and lo-fi". The lyrics of the song "shows how [lovers] hold on to time because they do not want to part [until each other turns to orange under the sunset]". The song "presents warmness like the sun that rises every day". Member Asahi, composer and writer of the song, "made it in the accommodation because the topline of the song flashed across [his] mind".

== Promotion ==
On November 6, 2020, Treasure held an 80-minute "countdown live" through V Live. The group explained their music and visuals through the broadcast. The music video for "Mmm" was released on the same day and surpassed 10 million views in approximately 72 hours since its release on YouTube. The group performed the song on various music programs of South Korea such as Show! Music Core and Inkigayo.

== Commercial performance ==
The First Step: Chapter Three surpassed 210,000 physical pre-orders, making Treasure a "Half a Million Seller". The single album rank 1st in the Gaon Album Chart on the 46th issued week of 2020. It debuted at number four on the monthly album chart, selling around 218,855 copies in November. Without any local promotional activities, the lead single "Mmm" topped Rakuten Music's Real-time Comprehensive Rankings, the third time since their debut. The song moved around from no. 1 to no. 4 for four days on the chart. Furthermore, the song charted-in on 93 regional charts including Apple Music. On November 14, the album topped Hanteo's Daily Album Sales chart.

== Track listing ==
The First Step: Chapter Three – Digital edition
No.	Title	Lyrics	Music	Arrangement	Length
1.	"Mmm" (음)	Godok; Choi Hyun-suk; Haruto; Yoshi	Future Bounce; AFTRSHOK; Czaer; Awry; Jan Baars; Nathan Lewis; Brian U	Future Bounce; AFTRSHOK; Czaer	3:28
2.	"Orange" (오렌지)	Asahi; Haruto; Choi Hyun-suk; Yoshi	Asahi; Future Bounce	Future Bounce	4:16
Total length:					7:44

The First Step: Chapter Three – CD
No.	Title	Music	Arrangement	Length
3.	"Mmm" (Instrumental)	Future Bounce; AFTRSHOK; Czaer; Awry; Jan Baars; Nathan Lewis; Brian U	Future Bounce; AFTRSHOK; Czaer	3:28
4.	"Orange" (Instrumental)	Asahi; Future Bounce	Future Bounce	4:16
Total length:				15:28

== Charts ==
=== Weekly charts ===
Weekly chart performance for The First Step: Chapter Three
Chart (2020)	Peak position
South Korean Albums (Gaon)	1

=== Monthly charts ===
Monthly chart performance for The First Step: Chapter Three
Chart (2020)	Peak position
South Korean Albums (Gaon)	5

=== Year-end charts ===
Chart (2020)	Position
South Korean Albums (Gaon)	42

== Certifications and sales ==
Sales certifications for The First Step: Chapter Three
Region	Certification	Certified units/sales
South Korea (KMCA)	Platinum	250,000^{^}
^{^} Shipments figures based on certification alone.

== Release history ==
Release history for The First Step: Chapter Three
Country	Date	Format(s)	Label	Ref.
Various	November 6, 2020	Digital download; streaming	YG; YG Plus	
South Korea	November 13, 2020	CD	YG; YG Plus	
China	November 13, 2020	CD	YG; YG Plus	
Japan	November 21, 2020	CD	YG; YG Plus	
