= Mmm (song) =

Single by Treasure

from the album The First Step: Chapter Three and The First Step: Treasure Effect
- Language: Korean; Japanese
- B-side: "Orange"
- Released: November 6, 2020
- Recorded: 2020
- Studio: YG (Seoul)
- Genre: Hip hop; trap
- Length: 3:28
- Label: YG; YGEX
- Composers: Future Bounce; AFTRSHOK; Czaer; Awry; Jan Baars; Nathan Lewis; Brian U
- Lyricists: Godok; Choi Hyun-suk; Haruto; Yoshi; Kickhaiku (JP)
- Producers: Future Bounce; AFTRSHOK

Treasure singles chronology
"I Love You" (2020)	"Mmm" (2020)	"My Treasure" (2021)

Music video
- "Mmm" on YouTube

"Mmm" (Korean: 음; RR: eum; lit. 'Well') is a song recorded by South Korean boy band Treasure that was released on November 6, 2020, by YG Entertainment and distributed by their in-house distribution company YG Plus as the lead single for their third single album, The First Step: Chapter Three. "Mmm" marks the third single of the group's The First Step series. The song was originally released in Korean, with the Japanese version included in the Japanese version of their debut studio album.

Production duo Future Bounce is credited as the producer of the song alongside AFTRSHOK. They collaborated with Czaer, Jan Baars, Nathan Lewis, and Brian U for composing the music. Treasure members Choi Hyun-suk, Haruto, and Yoshi wrote the lyrics to the track with Godok. Kickhaiku was also credited as a lyricist for the Japanese version.

The song would later charted in Billboard's World Digital Song Sales chart.

== Background ==
On October 26, 2020, YG Entertainment announced that Treasure will have their third comeback of the year with their third single album scheduled to be released on November 6. The following day, "Mmm" has been confirmed as the lead single for the single album. Contrary to most releases, the group previewed the choreography to the song in advance starting from November 2, five times every midnight cumulating about 18 seconds. The song was released alongside its music video on November 6.

== Composition ==
"Mmm" is categorized as a hybrid between hip-hop and trap genre.

Future Bounce teamed up with AFTRSHOK, Czaer, Jan Baars, Natha Lewis, and Brian U for composing the music. The former three were also involved in arrangement of the song in the key of C# Major with a tempo of 80 beats per minute, making it slower than the group's previous singles — "Boy" and "I Love You".

Members Choi Hyun-suk, Haruto, and Yoshi were credited as the lyricists alongside Godok and Kickhaiku (Japanese version). Member Mashiho hoped that the listeners would have their hearts pumping akin to the word "emergency" in the lyrics. In an interview following the release, Choi revealed that he was satisfied of being involved in the song's writing process. Yoshi added that his thoughts and emotions in his 20s helped in writing the song.

== Music video ==
The music video for "Mmm" was released on November 6. The members put an emphasis on the choreography and presenting a "more mature performance". The music video shows the members performing the choreography to the song across various backgrounds with LED lights.

However, the choreography became subject to criticism on social media on November 7 by fans who deemed that the choreography was "sadistic", as it involved parts where several members were required to step on the other member's back three times. YG Entertainment posted an open letter on their social media accounts the following day apologizing to the fans for the distress. The agency promised that the choreography would be revised for future performances of the song.

== Promotion and live performances ==
On November 12, YG Entertainment announced a dance cover contest of the song on their social media accounts as part of their promotion strategy for new songs of their artists. Until December 7, fans can participate in the contest by uploading a video on YouTube with #MMM_DanceCoverContest #TREASURE #음 #MMM and filling out a Google Form to confirm their entry.

The group performed "Mmm" for the first time with an appearance on Inkigayo on November 8, on Show! Music Core on November 21, and at the 2020 Mnet Asian Music Awards on December 6 where the group was announced as the "Best New Male Artist".

"Mmm" is a staple in the group's concert setlist, having been performed on Hello and Reboot tours, where they performed the song in rock-esque style for the latter.

== Commercial performance ==
"Mmm" debuted and peaked on Billboard's World Digital Song Sales chart on no. 11.

== Charts ==
=== Weekly charts ===
Chart performance for "Mmm"
Chart (2020)	Peak position
US World Digital Song Sales (Billboard)	11

== Release history ==
Release history for "Mmm"
Region	Date	Version	Format	Label	Ref
Various	November 6, 2020	Korean	Digital download; streaming	YG; YG Plus	—
Various	March 9, 2021	Japanese	Digital download; streaming	YGEX	
