= I Love You (Treasure song) =

Single by Treasure

from the album The First Step: Chapter Two and The First Step: Treasure Effect
- Language: Korean; Japanese
- B-side: "B.L.T. (Bling Like This)"
- Released: September 18, 2020
- Recorded: 2020
- Studio: YG (Seoul)
- Genre: Dance-pop
- Length: 3:01
- Label: YG; YGEX
- Composer: R.Tee
- Lyricists: R.Tee; Choi Hyun-suk; Haruto; Yoshi; Zero (Yves & Adams) (JP); Ta-Trow (JP)
- Producer: R.Tee

Treasure singles chronology
"Boy" (2020)	"I Love You" (2020)	"Mmm" (2020)

Music video
- "I Love You" on YouTube

"I Love You" (사랑해; Saranghae) is a song recorded by South Korean boy band Treasure for their second single album, The First Step: Chapter Two. It was released on September 18, 2020, by their agency, YG Entertainment and it was distributed by their in-house distribution company YG Plus. The song was originally released in Korean, while the Japanese version was included in the Japanese version of their first studio album the following year.

The song was produced by one of YG's producers, R.Tee, who was also involved in composing the music and writing the lyrics alongside members Choi Hyun-suk, Haruto, and Yoshi. Production team Zero (Yves & Adams) and Ta-Trow were the writers for the Japanese version of the song, alongside the aforementioned four.

"I Love You" would later chart in Billboard's World Digital Song Sales and Global 200 charts following its release.

== Background ==
Shortly after the release of Treasure's debut single album, The First Step: Chapter One, YG Entertainment announced that the group would release single albums throughout the remainder of the year before releasing a studio album.

Plans for the second single album were revealed after a hint in a behind-the-scenes video revealing that the group had just wrapped up filming for their second single, with a reported release on September 18. The upcoming song was stated to be more intense than the group's maiden single, "Boy". On September 9, the album name, The First Step: Chapter Two has been confirmed along with its songs, "I Love You" as the lead single and "B.L.T. (Bling Like This)" as the B-side.

The song was released alongside the single album and the music video on September 18.

== Composition ==
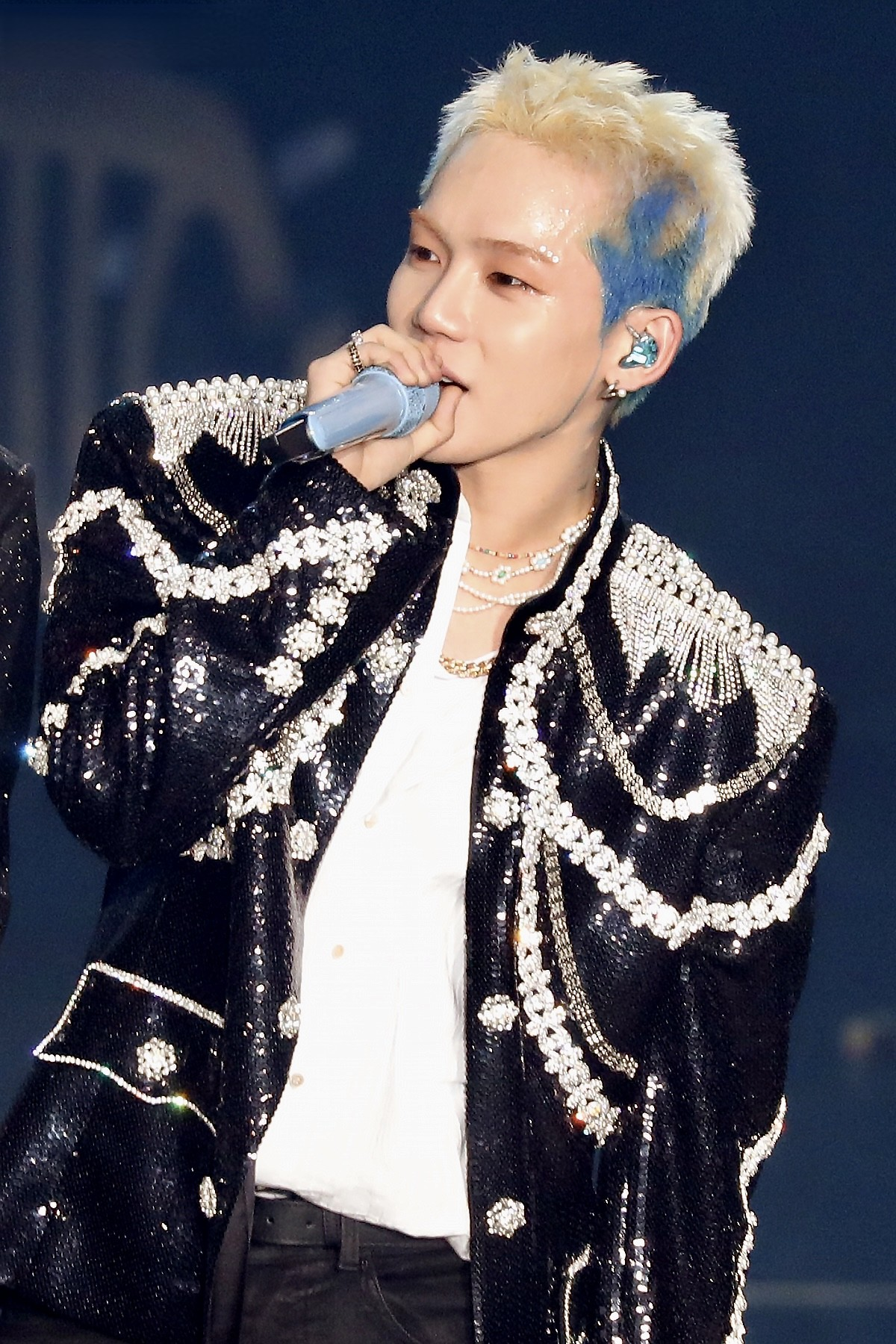
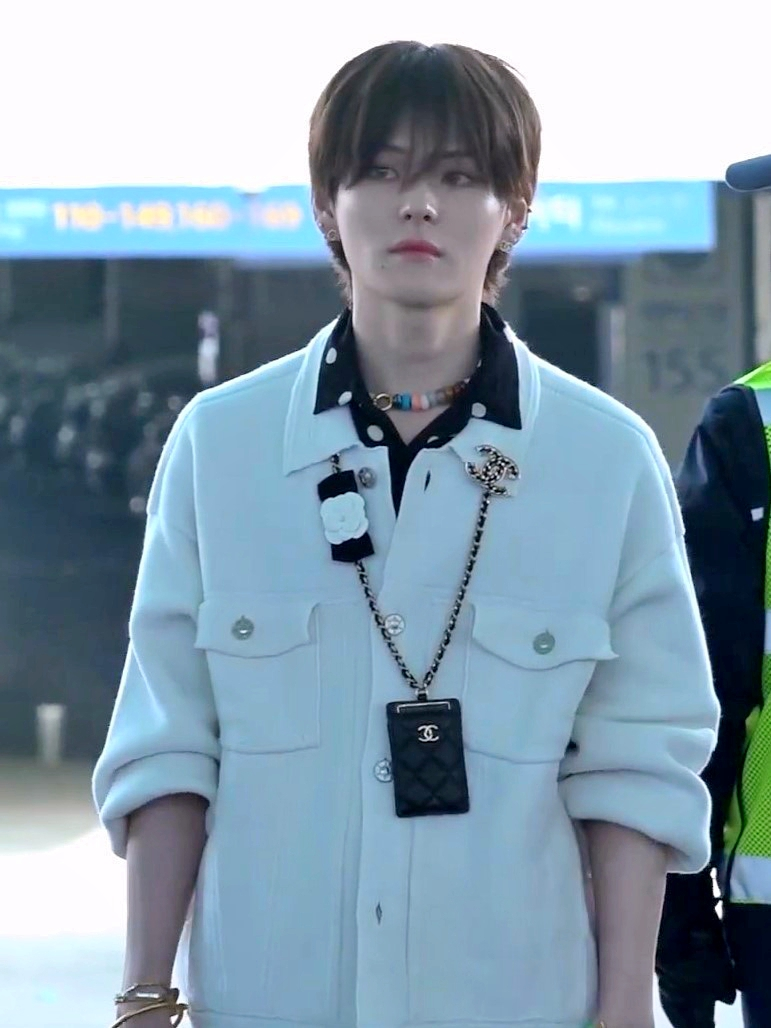
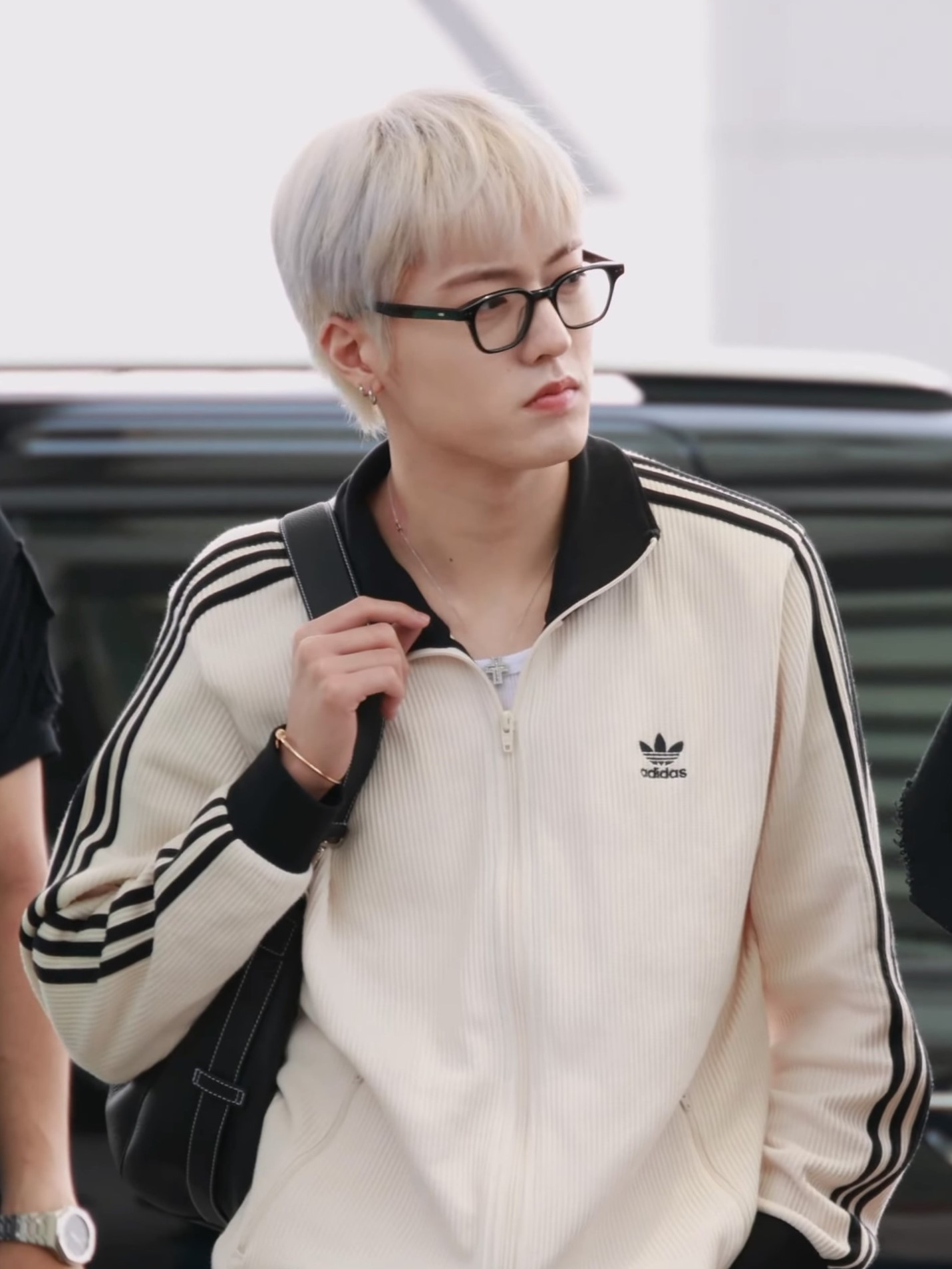
Members Choi Hyun-suk (left), Yoshi (middle), and Haruto (right) were involved in writing the rap lyrics

"I Love You" is classified as a dance-pop song produced by YG Entertainment's in-house producers R.Tee.

Solely composed by R.Tee, the song was arranged by Yena in the key of A-flat major with a tempo of 130 beats per minute.

The lyrics were penned by R.Tee alongside members Choi Hyun-suk, Yoshi, and Haruto. The lyrics express the feelings of love to someone. In an exclusive interview with Cosmpolitan Indonesia, "I Love You" is described by the group themselves as showing a "fresher" and a "more carefree" side of the group.

== Music video ==
The music video for "I Love You" was released on September 18. The video shows the members dancing to the energetic choreography of the song with an ocean-blue sky leading to a sunset in the background.

== Promotion and live performances ==
"I Love You" was first performed on Show! Music Core, on September 19, a day after the release. On September 20, the group performed on Inkigayo. The group returned to Show! Music Core on September 26. A return to Inkigayo took place on the following month on October 11.

A staple in the group's concerts, "I Love You" has been performed in their headlining concerts "Hello" and "Reboot".

== Commercial performance ==
The song debuted and peaked at number 9 of Billboard's World Digital Song Sales, and number 170 in the Global 200 charts.

== Charts ==
=== Weekly charts ===
Chart performance for "I Love You"
Chart (2020)	Peak position
South Korea BGM (Gaon)	113
US World Digital Song Sales (Billboard)	9
US Global 200 (Billboard)	170

== Release history ==
Release history for "I Love You"
Region	Date	Version	Format	Label	Ref
Various	September 18, 2020	Korean	Digital download; streaming	YG; YG Plus	—
Various	March 9, 2021	Japanese	Digital download; streaming	YGEX	

== See also ==
- Treasure discography
