= The First Step: Treasure Effect =

2021 studio album by Treasure

- Digital and Blue version cover

Studio album by Treasure
- Released: January 11, 2021
- Recorded: 2020
- Studio: YG (Seoul)
- Genres: K-pop; J-pop; dance; dance-pop; pop; rap; ballad; hip hop
- Length: 34:12 (Korean Digital); 40:46 (Korean Physical); 38:05 (Japanese Digital); 44:50 (Japanese Physical)
- Languages: Korean, Japanese
- Labels: YG; YGEX
- Producers: Future Bounce; Millennium; Q; R.Tee; Rovin

Treasure chronology
The First Step: Chapter Three (2020)	The First Step: Treasure Effect (2021)	The Second Step: Chapter One (2022)

Singles from The First Step: Treasure Effect
- 1. "Boy" Released: August 7, 2020; 2. "I Love You" Released: September 18, 2020; 3. "Mmm" Released: November 6, 2020; 4. "My Treasure" Released: January 11, 2021

Japanese album cover
- Digital, CD+DVD, and CD+Blu-ray version cover

Singles from The First Step: Treasure Effect (Japan)
- 1. "Beautiful" Released: February 14, 2021

The First Step: Treasure Effect is the debut studio album by South Korean boy band Treasure. It was released on January 11, 2021, through YG Entertainment. The album was released for pre-order on December 29, 2020. A music video for the album's "My Treasure" was released alongside the album. The digital version of the album contains 10 tracks, while the CD version contains 12 tracks. The physical album comes in three versions: Blue, Green and Orange. The album is primarily a K-pop record that combines hip hop, dance, dance-pop, pop, rap and ballad elements. The First Step: Treasure Effect is the fourth and final installment of The First Step series, following the group's single albums The First Step: Chapter One, The First Step: Chapter Two and The First Step: Chapter Three, all released in 2020 - all 3 single albums' songs appear on The First Step: Treasure Effect, along with the group's pre-debut song "Going Crazy".

== Background ==
On December 28, 2020, YG Entertainment uploaded a teaser poster through their official blog, confirming the title and release date of the album. On December 31, Treasure released the title poster for their album, revealing that the lead single is named "My Treasure". On January 4, 2021, YG revealed the track list for the album. Starting on January 5, a series of lyric posters with sentences from the lyrics of "My Treasure" were posted every day. The music video teaser for "My Treasure" was released on January 9. On March 31, the Japanese version was released, with "Beautiful" serving as the title track, and all other songs re-recorded in Japanese.

== Composition ==
YG Entertainment explained that the lyrics of "My Treasure" contain "meaning that everyone is a unique treasure-like being, which gives a hopeful message of 'Let’s cheer up in hard times. The sun will rise and shine again tomorrow'" and added, "through the song 'My Treasure', we hope that the fans who have been supporting Treasure and people out there suffering will be consoled". YG further described "My Treasure" as a "bright and exciting pop song" that will "cheer up the listeners and make them feel better in these hard times".

=== Songs ===
During the online press conference held by Treasure for the release of The First Step: Treasure Effect, the group described "My Treasure" as "a song carrying the message that we are all treasure-like beings. The intro piano melody and brass sounds create a harmony, making a cheerful mood". Written and composed by AKMU's Lee Chan-hyuk, "Slow Motion" "calmly progresses while incorporating bass and piano, expressing the theme of let’s go through this harsh world together while holding hands, slow but steady". "Be with Me" is a song with "whispers saying you should be with me together", and "Orange" is a song with "a retro vibe that sounds familiar yet fresh".

== Promotion ==
The First Step: Treasure Effect was released worldwide on January 11, 2021 through YG in conjunction with the music video for "My Treasure". In celebration of their comeback, the group held an online press conference 2 hours before the release to talk about the album.

=== Singles ===
An accompanying music video for "My Treasure" was uploaded to Treasure’s YouTube channel simultaneously with the single's release. In 13 hours, the music video reached 3.5 million views. Treasure promoted the song with televised live performances on various South Korean music programs including M Countdown, Show! Music Core and Inkigayo.

== Commercial performance ==
On January 12, "My Treasure" topped the Top Rising Chart of AWA, and "Going Grazy" also topped Rakuten Music’s Real-time Comprehensive Rankings. The First Step: Treasure Effect was ranked at number 1 on iTunes charts in 18 different countries, including Brazil, Hong Kong, Thailand, Singapore, Spain and India. The album was also ranked at number 2 on the Worldwide Albums chart. As of January 11, nearly 250,000 pre-orders were made on the album. On January 13, the album was ranked at number 1 on the real-time accumulated sales announced by Hanteo Charts in Korea.

== Track listing ==
=== Korean version ===
The First Step: Treasure Effect
No.	Title	Lyrics	Music	Arrangement	Length
1.	"My Treasure"	Bigtone; Min Yeon-jae; Choi Hyun-suk; Yoshi; Haruto	Future Bounce; AFTRSHOK; Geist Way; CSCS; H.Kenneth; Pollock	Future Bounce; AFTRSHOK	3:15
2.	"Be With Me" (나랑 있자; Narang itja; lit. Stay With Me)	Rovin; Kim Kyung; Choi Hyun-suk; Yoshi; Haruto	Rovin; Kim Sang-wook	Rovin	3:08
3.	"Slowmotion"	Lee Chan-hyuk; Choi Hyun-suk; Yoshi; Haruto	Lee Chan-hyuk; Millennium; Kim Chang-hoon	Millennium; Kim Chang-hoon	3:10
4.	"Boy"	Se.A; Choice37; Choi Hyun-suk; Haruto	Choice37; R.Tee; Hae; Se.A	R.Tee	3:16
5.	"Come to Me" (들어와; Deureowa; lit. Come In)	Rovin; Kim Kyung; Bigtone; Choi Hyun-suk; Yoshi; Haruto	Rovin	Rovin	3:24
6.	"I Love You" (사랑해; Saranghae)	R.Tee; Yoshi; Choi Hyun-suk; Haruto	R.Tee	R.Tee; Yena	3:01
7.	"B.L.T (Bling Like This)"	Kim Dong Joon; Choi Hyun-suk; Yoshi; Haruto; Trnc	Q; Trnc	Q; Trnc	3:25
8.	"Mmm" (음; Eum; lit. Well)	Godok; Choi Hyun-suk; Haruto; Yoshi	Future Bounce; AFTRSHOK; Czaer; Awry; Jan Baars; Nathan Lewis; Brian U	Future Bounce; AFTRSHOK; Czaer	3:28
9.	"Orange" (오렌지; Orenji)	Asahi; Haruto; Choi Hyun-suk; Yoshi	Asahi; Future Bounce	Future Bounce	4:16
10.	"Going Crazy" (미쳐가네; Michyeogane)	Future Bounce; Bigtone	Future Bounce	Future Bounce	3:44
Total length:					34:07

The First Step: Treasure Effect – CD only
No.	Title	Lyrics	Music	Arrangement	Length
11.	"I Love You" (Mellow Mood)	R.Tee; Yoshi; Choi Hyun-suk; Haruto	R.Tee	Rovin; LeeSS	3:12
12.	"Mmm" (Rock ver.)	Godok; Choi Hyun-suk; Haruto; Yoshi	Future Bounce; AFTRSHOK; Czaer; Awry; Jan Baars; Nathan Lewis; Brian U	Future Bounce; AFTRSHOK; Czaer	3:25
Total length:					40:36

=== Japanese version ===
The First Step: Treasure Effect
No.	Title	Lyrics	Music	Arrangement	Length
1.	"Beautiful^{[a]}" (from Black Clover, 2021)	Yoshi; Jun	D&H; Sunny Boy; Jun	D&H	3:49
2.	"My Treasure" (JP ver.)	Bigtone; Min Yeon-jae; Choi Hyun-suk; Yoshi; Haruto; ZERO (YVES&ADAMS)	Future Bounce; AFTRSHOK; Geist Way; CSCS; H.Kenneth; Pollock	Future Bounce; AFTRSHOK	3:17
3.	"Be With Me" (JP ver.)	Rovin; Kim Kyung; Choi Hyun-suk; Yoshi; Haruto; Jun	Rovin; Kim Sang-wook	Rovin	3:09
4.	"Slowmotion" (JP ver.)	Lee Chanhyuk; Choi Hyun-suk; Yoshi; Haruto; ZERO (YVES&ADAMS)	Lee Chanhyuk; Millennium; Kim Chang-hoon	Millennium; Kim Chang-hoon	3:11
5.	"Boy" (JP ver.)	Se.A; Choice37; Choi Hyun-suk; Haruto; ZERO (YVES&ADAMS)	Choice37; R.Tee; Hae; Se.A	R.Tee	3:17
6.	"Come to Me" (JP ver.^{[a]})	Rovin; Kim Kyung; Bigtone; Choi Hyun-suk; Yoshi; Haruto; ZERO (YVES&ADAMS)	Rovin	Rovin	3:25
7.	"I Love You" (JP ver.)	R.Tee; Yoshi; Choi Hyun-suk; Haruto; ZERO (YVES&ADAMS); TA-TROW	R.Tee	R.Tee; Yena	3:02
8.	"B.L.T (Bling Like This)" (JP ver.^{[a]})	Kim Dong Joon; Choi Hyun-suk; Yoshi; Haruto; Trnc; TA-TROW	Q; Trnc	Q; Trnc	3:25
9.	"Mmm" (JP ver.)	Godok; Choi Hyun-suk; Haruto; Yoshi; kickhaiku	Future Bounce; AFTRSHOK; Czaer; Awry; Jan Baars; Nathan Lewis; Brian U	Future Bounce; AFTRSHOK; Czaer	3:28
10.	"Orange" (オレンジ Orenji; JP ver.^{[a]})	Asahi; Haruto; Choi Hyun-suk; Yoshi	Asahi; Future Bounce	Future Bounce	4:17
11.	"Going Crazy" (ミチョガネ Michogane; JP ver.)	Future Bounce; Bigtone; TA-TROW	Future Bounce	Future Bounce	3:46
Total length:					38:13

The First Step: Treasure Effect – CD only
No.	Title	Lyrics	Music	Arrangement	Length
12.	"I Love You" (Mellow Mood (JP ver.)^{[a]})	R.Tee; Yoshi; Choi Hyun-suk; Haruto; ZERO (YVES&ADAMS); TA-TROW	R.Tee	Rovin; LeeSS	3:17
13.	"Mmm" (Rock ver. (JP ver.)^{[a]})	Godok; Choi Hyun-suk; Haruto; Yoshi; kickhaiku	Future Bounce; AFTRSHOK; Czaer; Awry; Jan Baars; Nathan Lewis; Brian U	Future Bounce; AFTRSHOK; Czaer	3:30
Total length:					45:00

The First Step: Treasure Effect – DVD/Blu-ray only
No.	Title	Length
1.	"Boy" (Music video)	3:15
2.	"I Love You" (Music video)	3:00
3.	"Mmm" (Music video)	3:25
4.	"My Treasure" (Music video)	3:13
5.	"Behind the Scenes of "The First Step: Treasure Effect""

Notes

- ^{^{^[a]}} Not included in the standard edition of the CD.
- All tracks are stylized in all caps.

== Charts ==
=== Weekly charts ===
Chart performance for The First Step: Treasure Effect
Chart (2021)	Peak position
Finnish Physical Albums (Suomen virallinen lista)	10
Japanese Albums (Oricon)	1
Japanese Hot Albums (Billboard Japan)	1
South Korean Albums (Gaon)	1

=== Monthly charts ===
Monthly chart performance for The First Step: Treasure Effect
Chart (2021)	Peak position
South Korean Albums (Gaon)	1

=== Year-end charts ===
Year-end chart performance for The First Step: Treasure Effect
Chart (2021)	Position
South Korean Albums (Gaon)	43

== Certifications and sales figures ==
Sales certifications and figures for The First Step: Treasure Effect
Region	Certification	Certified units/sales
South Korea (KMCA)	Platinum	350,000
Japan	—	85,823 (Note: Japan sales figures for The First Step: Treasure Effect.)

== Release history ==
Release dates and formats for The First Step: Treasure Effect
Region	Date	Version	Format(s)	Label(s)	Ref.
Various	January 11, 2021	Korean	Digital download; streaming	YG	
South Korea	January 12, 2021	Korean	CD; KiT Player	YG	
Japan	January 12, 2021	Korean	CD; KiT Player	YG	
Japan	March 31, 2021	Japanese	CD; CD+DVD; CD+Blu-ray	YGEX	
Various	March 31, 2021	Japanese	Digital download; streaming	YGEX	
