= Beautiful (Treasure song) =

- Full version cover

Single by Treasure

from the album Black Clover season 4 OST and The First Step: Treasure Effect (Japanese version)
- Language: Japanese
- Released: February 14, 2021
- Recorded: 2020
- Studio: Prime Sound Studio Form (Tokyo)
- Genre: J-pop
- Length: 3:49
- Label: YGEX
- Composers: D&H; Sunny Boy
- Lyricists: Yoshi; Jun
- Producer: TinyVoice

Treasure singles chronology
"My Treasure" (2021)	"Beautiful" (2021)	"Jikjin" (2022)

Music video
- "Beautiful" on YouTube

"Beautiful" is a Japanese song recorded by South Korean boy band Treasure that was released in full version on February 14, 2021, by YGEX for the Black Clover anime series and the lead single for the Japanese version of the group's debut studio album.

== Background ==
On December 15, 2020, the official website of the Black Clover anime announced that the group will perform the 13th ending theme of the anime with a song called "Beautiful", which is set to be premiered for the first time on January 5, 2021. The song is the group's first original Japanese song and marked their entry to the Japanese market, where some of the members hailed from.

The song was released on January 5, 2021, and was performed on the fourth episode of the anime's fourth season (158th episode overall). On January 22, YG Entertainment announced that Treasure will release the Japanese version of their studio album on March 31, with the full version of "Beautiful" as its lead single. On the same day, the group uploaded a music video of "Beautiful" featuring the snippet of the closing music video that plays at the end of each episode, on their YouTube.

The full version of the song was released on February 14, 2021.

== Composition ==
"Beautiful" is a medium-tempo J-pop ballad song with positive lyrics and warm emotions. It was co-written by Treasure member Yoshi and Jun. D&H and Sunny Boy served as the co-composer of the song in the key of C major with a tempo of 128 beats per minute. Production group TinyVoice was credited as the producer in which Jun, D&H, and Sunny Boy were part of.

== Charts ==
Chart performance for "Beautiful"
Chart (2021)	Peak position
Japan Hot 100 (Billboard Japan)	58
US World Digital Song Sales (Billboard)	23

== Credits and personnel ==
Credits adapted from the album's liner notes.

Studio

- Prime Sound Studio Form – recording
- Daimonion Recordings – mixing
- Form The Master – mastering

Personnel

- YG Entertainment – executive producer
- Masato Matsuura – executive producer
- TinyVoice – producer
  - Jun – lyrics
  - D&H – composition, arranger
  - Sunny Boy – composition
- Treasure – vocals
  - Yoshi – lyrics
- Hideaki Jinbu – recording
- D.O.I – mixing
- Raiga Yamazaki – mastering

== Release history ==
Release history for "Beautiful"
Region	Date	Format	Version	Label
Various	January 5, 2021	Digital download; streaming	Anime edit	YGEX
Various	February 14, 2021	Digital download; streaming	Full version	YGEX
