= The First Step: Chapter Two =

- Digital cover

Single album by Treasure
- Released: September 18, 2020
- Studio: YG (Seoul)
- Genre: Future house; dance-pop
- Length: 6:26 (Digital); 12:52 (Physical)
- Language: Korean; English
- Label: YG; YG Plus
- Producer: Q; R.Tee; Trnc; Yena

Treasure chronology
The First Step: Chapter One (2020)	The First Step: Chapter Two (2020)	The First Step: Chapter Three (2020)

Singles from The First Step: Chapter Two
- 1. "I Love You" Released: September 18, 2020

The First Step: Chapter Two is the second single album by South Korean boy group Treasure released on September 18, 2020, by YG Entertainment and distributed by YG Plus. It was later released physically on September 22. The single album was released for pre-order on 7 September. The single album was produced by R. Tee, Yena, Q and Trnc. The First Step: Chapter Two is primarily a dance-pop record with influences of future house elements. Commercially, the single album peaked at number two on the Gaon Album Chart and sold 219,000 units.

== Background and promotion ==
Before the group debuted, their label YG Entertainment announced multiple single album releases before a studio album would release. The group debuted with The First Step: Chapter One on August 7 and its title-track "Boy". On September 1, YG uploaded the first teaser for the second single album on various social media profiles. Furthermore, YG called the title track "more intense" than "Boy". One week later, the label shared the release date and pre-orders for two physical versions went live. The title-track "I Love You" was revealed on September 9 and the tracklist the following day. The following days, the label uploaded individual member teasers.

The First Step: Chapter Two was released digitally in various locations on September 18, 2020, alongside the music video for the album's single "I Love You".

== Composition ==
Melon described that The First Step: Chapter Two "presents a feeling of excitement with a visual that doubles the youth's intense passion and innocence as well as a refreshing feeling". "I Love You" is "a dance-pop song with a dynamic composition with unexpected reversal" and "features a brass line that explodes with the 808 base". Lyrically, the song "states about purely moving straight for the one you love". "B.L.T (Bling Like This)" "metaphorically interpreted the desire to recover time and memories along the path created by the Milky Way and starlight illuminating the darkness". In a live broadcast held by Treasure on September 18, 2020, regarding the song "B.L.T (Bling Like This)", member Mashiho stated, "I felt like I became a boy since it made me feel emotions when I was young", and added, "there were unexpected emotions and charms of love with its fiercer beats" in the lead single.

== Commercial performance ==
According to YG, The First Step: Chapter Two surpassed 200,000 physical pre-orders, making Treasure a "Half a Million Seller". The single album debuted atop the Gaon Album Chart on the 39th issued week of 2020. It debuted at number four on the monthly album chart, selling around 219,000 copies in September.

== Track listing ==
The First Step: Chapter Two – Digital edition
No.	Title	Lyrics	Music	Arrangement	Length
1.	"I Love You" (사랑해)	R.Tee; Yoshi; Choi Hyun-suk; Haruto	R.Tee	R.Tee; Yena	3:01
2.	"B.L.T (Bling Like This)"	Kim Dong Joon; Choi Hyun-suk; Yoshi; Haruto; Trnc	Q; Trnc	Q; Trnc	3:25
Total length:					6:26

The First Step: Chapter Two – CD
No.	Title	Music	Arrangement	Length
3.	"I Love You" (Instrumental)	R.Tee	R.Tee; Yena	3:01
4.	"B.L.T (Bling Like This)" (Instrumental)	Q; Trnc	Q; Trnc	3:25
Total length:				12:52

== Charts ==
=== Weekly charts ===
Weekly chart performance for The First Step: Chapter Two
Chart (2020)	Peak position
South Korean Albums (Gaon)	2

=== Monthly charts ===
Monthly chart performance for The First Step: Chapter Two
Chart (2020)	Peak position
South Korean Albums (Gaon)	4

=== Year-end charts ===
Chart (2020)	Position
South Korean Albums (Gaon)	40

== Certifications and sales ==
Sales certifications for The First Step: Chapter Two
Region	Certification	Certified units/sales
South Korea (KMCA)	Platinum	250,000^{^}
^{^} Shipments figures based on certification alone.

== Release history ==
Release history for The First Step: Chapter Two
Region	Date	Format(s)	Label	Ref.
Various	September 18, 2020	Digital download; streaming	YG; YG Plus	
South Korea	September 22, 2020	CD	YG; YG Plus	
China	September 22, 2020	CD	YG; YG Plus	
Japan	September 28, 2020	CD	YG; YG Plus	
