= The Second Step: Chapter Two =

- Digital cover

EP by Treasure
- Released: October 4, 2022
- Recorded: 2022
- Studio: YG (Seoul)
- Genre: Hip-hop; R&B
- Length: 15:52 (Korean Digital); 19:27 (Korean Physical); 19:17 (Japanese Digital); 23:01 (Japanese Physical)
- Language: Korean; Japanese
- Label: YG; YG Plus; YGEX
- Producer: Choice37; Dee.P; LP; Sonny

Treasure chronology
The Second Step: Chapter One (2022)	The Second Step: Chapter Two (2022)	Here I Stand (2023)

Singles from The Second Step: Chapter Two
- 1. "Hello" Released: October 4, 2022

The Second Step: Chapter Two is the second extended play (EP) by South Korean boy band Treasure. The EP was released by YG Entertainment on October 4, 2022.

This release marks Treasure’s first as a 10-member group, as Bang Ye-dam and Mashiho were on a then temporary hiatus at the time and then subsequently left the group on November 8, 2022.

== Background ==
At the dawn on September 1, 2022, YG Entertainment announced Treasure would release its second extended play (EP), The Second Step: Chapter Two, which will be released on October 4. Their second Japanese extended play, entitled with the same name will be released on November 30, 2022.

== Track listing ==
The Second Step: Chapter Two track listing
No.	Title	Lyrics	Music	Arrangement	Length
1.	"Hello"	Choice37; Sonny; Lil G; LP; Hae; Choi Hyun-suk; Yoshi; Haruto	Choice37; Hae; LP; Sonny; Lil G; Dee.P; Choi Hyun-suk; Yoshi; Haruto	Dee.P; Hae; LP; Choice37; Sonny	3:01
2.	"VolKno" (performed by Choi Hyun-suk, Yoshi, Haruto)	Choi Hyun-suk; Yoshi; Haruto	Dee.P; Choi Hyun-suk; Yoshi; Haruto	Dee.P	3:15
3.	"Clap!"	Asahi; Choi Hyun-suk; Yoshi; Haruto	Asahi; Dee.P	Dee.P	3:03
4.	"Thank You" (고마워; performed by Asahi, Haruto)	Asahi; Haruto	Asahi; Dee.P	Asahi; Dee.P	3:16
5.	"Hold It In" (물 어둡다; Mul Eoduptta; lit. The Water is Dark)	Choi Hyun-suk	Choi Hyun-suk; Rovin; Dee.P	Dee.P; Rovin; YJ	3:17
Total length:					15:52

The Second Step: Chapter Two – CD only
No.	Title	Lyrics	Music	Arrangement	Length
6.	"Darari" (Rock remix)	Jaguaa; Bang Ye-dam; Choice37; Lil G; Choi Hyun-suk; LP; Yoshi; Sonny; Hae; Se.A; Haruto	Choice37; Hea; Jaguaa; Bang Ye-dam; Choi Hyun-suk; Yoshi; Sonny; LP; Lil G; Haruto	Dee.P	3:44
Total length:					19:27

Japanese version track listing
No.	Title	Length
1.	"Hello" (Japanese version)	3:01
2.	"VolKno" (Japanese version)	3:16
3.	"Clap!" (Japanese version)	3:03
4.	"Thank You" (ありがとう; Japanese version)	3:16
5.	"Hold It In" (Japanese version)	3:17
6.	"Yamai" (病)	3:25
Total length:		19:17

Japanese version track listing – CD only
No.	Title	Length
7.	"Darari" (Japanese version; rock remix)	3:44
Total length:		23:01

Japanese version track listing – DVD, Blu-ray
No.	Title	Length
1.	"Hello" (music video)
2.	"Hello" (behind the scene)
3.	"Jikjin" (performance video; TV edit)
4.	"Jikjin Go Straight Light-Up Campaign Commemorative Special Program" (behind the scenes)

== Charts ==
=== Weekly charts ===
Chart performance for The Second Step: Chapter Two
Chart (2022)	Peak position
Japanese Albums (Oricon)	2
Japanese Combined Albums (Oricon)	2
Japanese Hot Albums (Billboard Japan)	2
South Korean Albums (Circle)	2

=== Monthly charts ===
Monthly chart performance for The Second Step: Chapter Two
Chart (2022)	Peak position
Japanese Albums (Oricon)	4
South Korean Albums (Circle)	5

=== Year-end charts ===
2022 year-end chart performance for The Second Step: Chapter Two
Chart (2022)	Position
Japanese Albums (Oricon)	63
Japanese Albums (Oricon) Japanese vers.	57
Japanese Top Album Sales (Billboard Japan)	92
South Korean Albums (Circle)	36

2023 year-end chart performance for The Second Step: Chapter Two
Chart (2023)	Position
Japanese Albums (Oricon)	70
Japanese Hot Albums (Billboard Japan)	47

== Certifications ==
Certifications for The Second Step: Chapter Two
Region	Certification	Certified units/sales
Japan (RIAJ)	Gold	100,000^{^}
South Korea (KMCA)	Platinum	250,000^{^}
^{^} Shipments figures based on certification alone.

== Release history ==
Release dates and formats for The Second Step: Chapter Two
Region	Date	Version	Format(s)	Label(s)	Ref.
Various	October 4, 2022	Korean	Digital download; streaming	YG	
South Korea	October 4, 2022	Korean	CD; KiT Player	YG	
Japan	October 4, 2022	Korean	CD	YG	
Japan	November 30, 2022	Japanese	CD; CD+DVD; CD+Blu-ray	YGEX	
Various	November 30, 2022	Japanese	Digital download; streaming	YGEX	
