= The Second Step: Chapter One =

- Digital cover

EP by Treasure
- Released: February 15, 2022
- Studio: YG Studio
- Genres: Hip hop; R&B
- Length: 13:13 (Korean & Japanese Digital); 20:29 (Korean & Japanese Physical)
- Languages: Korean; Japanese
- Labels: YG; YGEX
- Producers: Choice37; AiRPLAY

Treasure chronology
The First Step: Treasure Effect (2021)	The Second Step: Chapter One (2022)	The Second Step: Chapter Two (2022)

Singles from The Second Step: Chapter One
- 1. "Jikjin" Released: February 15, 2022

The Second Step: Chapter One is the first extended play (EP) by South Korean boy band Treasure. The EP was released by YG Entertainment on February 15, 2022. The EP is also the last album to feature Yedam and Mashiho as they left the group in November 2022.

== Background ==
On January 11, 2022, YG Entertainment released the teaser video announcing comeback date to be February 15. On February 24, the band received their first-ever music show win through the cable network program, Show Champion, and the single "Jikjin". Their first Japanese extended play, entitled with the same name was released on March 23, 2022.

== Commercial performance ==
On January 20, 2022, it was reported that the EP had reached 600,000 pre-order sales. The music video of its titular, "Jikjin" (직진), acquired a ₩500 million ($420,000) investment by the band's label and accumulated 10 and 20 million views in 21 hours and under three days respectively on the platform, YouTube, both personal records. Its view count rose by five times, faster than its previous releases. The first installation recorded a sales figure of 700,000 copies in three days time upon its release, also a personal best.

Darari, the other song of the EP went viral on TikTok with over 5 million videos used on the platform. It also peaked at position 97 on Spotify Global Charts.

== Track listing ==
The Second Step: Chapter One track listing
No.	Title	Lyrics	Music	Arrangement	Length
1.	"Jikjin" (직진; jigjin; lit. 'Straight')	Sonny; LIL G; Choice37; LP; HAE; Choi Hyun-suk; Yoshi; Haruto; Se.A	Choice37; LP; Sonny; Future Bounce; HAE; Se.A; Choi Hyun-suk; Yoshi; Haruto	Future Bounce; LP; Choice37	3:04
2.	"U"	Nu.D; Sonny; LP; LIL G; Choice37; HAE; Choi Hyun-suk; Haruto; Yoshi	Choice37; HAE; Sonny; LP; LIL G; Nu.D; Choi Hyun-suk; Haruto; Yoshi	HAE; Choice37; LP	2:48
3.	"Darari" (다라리)	Jaguaa; Bang Ye-dam; Choice37; LIL G; Choi Hyun-suk; LP; Yoshi; Sonny; HAE; Se.A; Haruto	Choice37; HAE; Jaguaa; Bang Ye-dam; Choi Hyun-suk; Yoshi; Sonny; LP, LIL G; Haruto	HAE; Choice37	3:40
4.	"It's Okay" (괜찮아질 거야; gwaenchanh-ajil geoya; lit. 'It will be okay')	Kid Wine; Airplay; Choi Hyun-suk; Haruto; Yoshi	Airplay; Kid Wine	Airplay	3:40
Total length:					13:13

The Second Step: Chapter One – CD only
No.	Title	Lyrics	Music	Arrangement	Length
5.	"BFF (Best Friend Forever)"	Choi Hyun-suk; MGNTK; Q	Q; Choi Hyun-suk; MGNTK	Q; MGNTK	3:22
6.	"Gonna Be Fine" (performed by Jihoon, Bang Ye-dam, Haruto, Jeongwoo)	Edle	Q; Modo	Q; MGNTK	3:55
Total length:					20:29

Japanese version track listing
No.	Title	Japanese lyrics	Length
1.	"Jikjin" (Japanese version)	Kickhaiku	3:04
2.	"U" (Japanese version)	Zero (J-Hiphop)	2:48
3.	"Darari" (Japanese version)	Jun	3:40
4.	"It's Okay" (Japanese version)	Ta-Trow	3:40
Total length:			13:13

Japanese version track listing – CD only
No.	Title	Japanese lyrics	Length
5.	"BFF (Best Friend Forever)" (Japanese version)	Ta-Trow	3:22
6.	"Gonna Be Fine" (Japanese version)	Zero (J-Hiphop)	3:55
Total length:			20:29

Japanese version track listing – DVD, Blu-ray
No.	Title	Length
1.	"Jikjin" (music video)	3:03
2.	"Jikjin" (behind the scene)	14:01
3.	"Beautiful" (music video)	3:46
4.	"Beautiful" (behind the scenes)	11:42
5.	"Beautiful" (music video; vertical version)	3:48
6.	"Beautiful" (recording behind the scenes)	3:44
7.	"Boy" (performance video; TV edit)	2:29
8.	"My Treasure" (performance video; TV edit)	3:15
9.	"My Treasure" (one take performance video)	3:15
10.	"My Treasure" (relay dance challenge)	3:14
11.	"My Treasure" (speed dance challenge)	2:56
12.	"MMM" (rock version; relay dance challenge)	3:24
13.	"MMM" (rock version; speed dance challenge)	2:51
14.	"Fighting Treasure (Morning)"	0:04
15.	"Fighting Treasure (Daytime)"	0:04
16.	"Fighting Treasure (Night)"	0:04
17.	"Fighting Treasure" (making)	4:04
18.	"Happy★Treasure Cooking" (ハッピー★TREASURE クッキング)
19.	"Mogumogu★Treasure" (モグモグ★TREASURE)
20.	"Treasure Gourmet Tour★2021" (TREASURE グルメツアー★2021)	13:33

== Accolades ==
Music program awards for Jikjin
Program	Date
Music Bank (KBS)	February 25, 2022
Show Champion (MBC M)	February 23, 2022

== Charts ==
=== Weekly charts ===
Chart performance for The Second Step: Chapter One
Chart (2022)	Peak position
Japanese Albums (Oricon)	1
Japanese Combined Albums (Oricon)	1
Japanese Hot Albums (Billboard Japan)	1
South Korean Albums (Gaon)	1

=== Monthly charts ===
Monthly chart performance for The Second Step: Chapter One
Chart (2022)	Peak position
Japanese Albums (Oricon)	6
South Korean Albums (Gaon)	1

=== Year-end charts ===
Year-end chart performance for The Second Step: Chapter One
Chart (2022)	Position
Japanese Albums (Oricon)	48
Japanese Albums (Oricon) Japanese vers.	55
Japanese Hot Albums (Billboard Japan)	38
South Korean Albums (Circle)	24

== Release history ==
Release dates and formats for The Second Step: Chapter One
Region	Date	Version	Format(s)	Label(s)	Ref.
Various	February 15, 2022	Korean	Digital download; streaming	YG	
South Korea	February 15, 2022	Korean	CD; KiT Player	YG	
Japan	February 15, 2022	Korean	CD	YG	
Japan	March 31, 2022	Japanese	CD; DVD; Blu-ray	YGEX	
Various	March 31, 2022	Japanese	Digital download; streaming	YGEX	
