= Boy (Treasure song) =

Single by Treasure

from the album The First Step: Chapter One and The First Step: Treasure Effect
- Language: Korean; Japanese
- B-side: "Come to Me"
- Released: August 7, 2020
- Recorded: 2020
- Studio: YG (Seoul)
- Genre: EDM
- Length: 3:17
- Label: YG; YGEX
- Composers: Choice37; R.Tee; Hae; Se.A
- Lyricists: Se.A; Choice37; Choi Hyun-suk; Haruto
- Producers: Choice37; R.Tee; Hae

Treasure singles chronology
"Boy" (2020)	"I Love You" (2020)

Music video
- "Boy" on YouTube

"Boy" is a song recorded by South Korean boy band Treasure for their debut single album, The First Step: Chapter One. It was released on August 7, 2020, as the lead single of the album by YG Entertainment and it was distributed by their in-house distribution company YG Plus. The song was composed by Choice37, R.Tee, Hae, and Se.A. Treasure members Choi Hyun-suk and Haruto were involved in penning the lyrics alongside Se.A, and Choice37. The song was originally released in Korean before the Japanese version was added to the Japanese version of their debut studio album the following year.

The song achieved success overseas, peaking at number 46 in Billboard Japan's Hot 100 chart. Meanwhile, in the United States, it peaked at number 7 in Billboard's World Digital Song Sales chart.

== Background ==
On November 20, 2018, YG Entertainment announced their plan to debut a new boy band to succeed their previous debuted groups, Winner and iKon. The agency then reported that the selection process will be documented through a talent survival show YG Treasure Box. The show eventually produced two groups, Treasure and Magnum, which eventually became active as Treasure 13.

On December 31, 2019, member Ha Yoon-bin departed the group following his intention to pursue a solo career. The groups were eventually merged into a 12-member single group called Treasure.

In January 2020, the group released a pre-debut track "Going Crazy". Four months later, YG Entertainment announced the scheduled debut date of Treasure will be in July 2020, becoming YG's first new group debut since Blackpink in 2016. On July 30, YG announced the track list for Treasure's debut single album with "Boy" serving as the title track. On 3 August, the teaser video for "Boy" was released and was described as "different" from the debut song of Treasure's predecessors which often lean towards hip-hop. The song was released alongside its music video on August 7.

== Composition ==
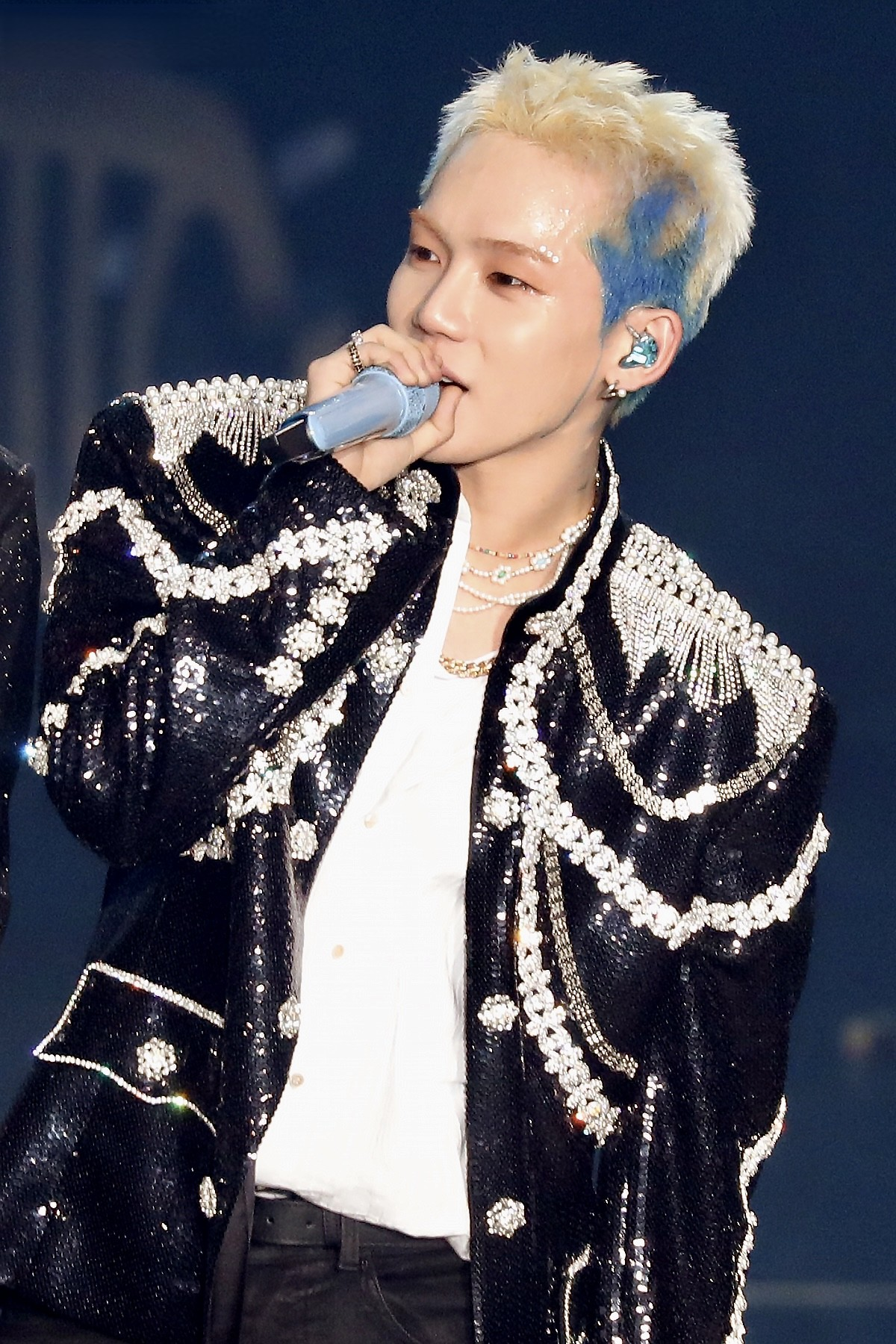
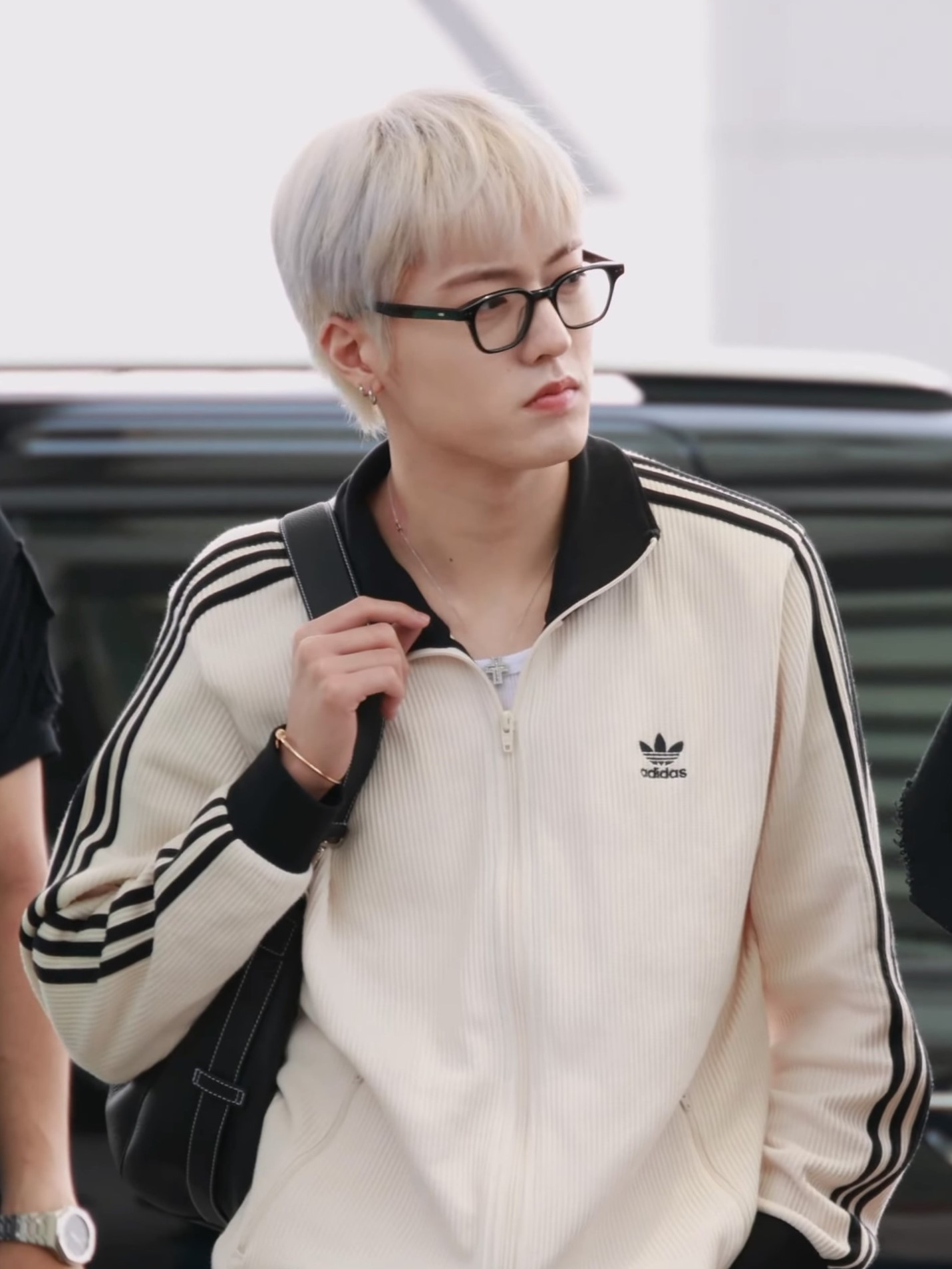
Members Choi Hyun-suk (left) and Haruto (right) were involved in writing the rap lyrics

"Boy" is classified as an EDM song. The song was produced by YG's in-house producers, Choice37, R.Tee, and Hae.

The song was composed by Choice37, R.Tee, Hae, and Se.A, and was arranged by R.Tee in the key of F minor with a tempo of 110 beats per minute.

The lyrics were written by Se.A and Choice37 alongside Treasure members Choi Hyun-suk and Haruto who were involved in penning the rap lyrics alongside Se.A, and Choice37. Lyrically, the song narrates the story of a protagonist to make a girl fall for him.

== Music video ==
The music video for "Boy" was released on August 7. The video shows the members performing the choreography of the song across several different backgrounds. Within two days of the release, the video have garnered 10 million viewers and resulted in the group's subscriber count to reach 1.6 million. The music video was followed up with the release of a behind-the-scenes video on August 12. A "special performance" version of the music video was released on August 20, showing the members performing the choreography to the song in a studio. The music video for the Japanese version was released on March 9, 2021, featuring the same plot as the original Korean version.

== Promotion and live performances ==
Treasure promoted the song for the first time by a performance in SBS' Inkigayo on August 9, before a return performance two weeks later on August 23.

The song is a staple track in the group's concerts. It was first performed live in their first Asia tour, Treasure Tour: Hello. It was then featured in the group's second headlining concert, Reboot.

== Commercial performance ==
The song debuted and peaked at number 46 in Billboard Japan's Hot 100 Chart. In the United States, the song debuted and peaked at number 7.

== Charts ==
=== Weekly charts ===
Chart performance for "Boy"
Chart (2020)	Peak position
Japan Hot 100 (Billboard)	46
US World Digital Song Sales (Billboard)	7

== Release history ==
Release history for "Boy"
Region	Date	Version	Format	Label
Various	August 7, 2020	Korean	Digital download; streaming	YG; YG Plus
Various	March 9, 2021	Japanese	Digital download; streaming	YGEX

== See also ==
- Treasure discography
