= R.Tee =

South Korean music producer

- Born: Kim Jung-gu; March 6, 1990 (age 36); South Korea
- Genres: Hip hop; electronica; dance
- Occupations: Record producer; songwriter; DJ
- Years active: 2014–present
- Labels: The Black Label; RTST Label

Korean name
- Hangul: 김중구
- RR: Gim Junggu
- MR: Kim Chunggu

Kim Jung-gu (Korean: 김중구, born March 6, 1990), known professionally as R.Tee (알티), is a South Korean record producer, songwriter, and DJ formerly signed with The Black Label. He has produced songs for artists including Big Bang, Blackpink, iKon, and Winner.

== Early life ==
Kim Jung-gu was born on March 6, 1990 (February 10, 1990 by the lunar calendar). He liked Radiohead when he was young, so he felt happy when he saved money and bought a Radiohead T-shirt. Later, he wanted to always be happy no matter what music he did, so he shortened "Radiohead T-shirt" into "R.Tee" and began to use it as his stage name. He became interested in electronica after watching Deadmau5 perform. He studied Korean painting in college.

== Career ==
In 2014, R.Tee released his debut single "We Got the World". In 2015, he appeared on the DJ competition TV show Headliner. He signed to Dee Company, an entertainment agency founded by Yoon Do-hyun. In 2019, he released the single "What Are You Waiting For" with Anda, which received critical acclaim. In 2022, he appeared on Show Me the Money 11 as judge and producer.

In 2025, R.Tee left The Black Label and started his own record label, RTST Label.

In October 2025, French singer Yseult accused him and singer Soyeon of plagiarizing her music video.

== Discography ==
=== Singles ===
Title	Year
"We Got the World" (Feat. Hani)	2014
"What Are You Waiting For" (뭘 기다리고 있어) (with Anda)	2019
"DAMDADI" (Feat. Soyeon of i-dle)	2025

=== Songwriting and production credits ===
Credits are adapted from the Korean Music Copyright Association database. R.Tee's search ID is 10000790.

Year	Artist	Song	Album	Lyrics		Music		Arrangement	
Year	Artist	Song	Album	Credited	With	Credited	With	Credited	With
2014	Badkiz	"Babomba"	non-album single	No	—N/a	No	—N/a	Yes	Uppercut
2014	C-Clown	"Justice" (암행어사)	Let's Love	No	—N/a	Yes	Shinsadong Tiger, Bum&Nang	No	—N/a
2015	Seo In-young	"High Heeled" (feat. Dok2)	SIY	No	—N/a	Yes	The Platonix01	No	—N/a
2015	YB	"20 Years" (스무살)	non-album single	No	—N/a	Yes	Yoon Do-hyun	No	—N/a
2016	Nada, Jeon So-yeon	"Scary" (무서워)	Unpretty Rapstar 3	No	—N/a	Yes	Kush	Yes	Kush
2016	MOBB	"Hit Me" (feat. Kush)	The MOBB	No	—N/a	No	—N/a	Yes	Teddy, Kush, Choice37
2016	Blackpink	"Playing With Fire"	Square Two	No	—N/a	Yes	Teddy	Yes	—N/a
2016	Big Bang	"Fxxk It"	Made	No	—N/a	Yes	Teddy, T.O.P, G-Dragon	Yes	Teddy
2017	Taeyang	"Wake Me Up"	White Night	No	—N/a	Yes	Joe Rhee, Kush	Yes	Kush
2017	Mix Nine	"Just Dance"	Mix Nine Part 1	No	—N/a	Yes	Joe Rhee, Teddy, Kush	No	—N/a
2017	Yoon Do-hyun	"Trip"	non-album single	No	—N/a	Yes	Yoon Do-hyun, Heo Jun, Chewsup	No	—N/a
2018	Taeyang	"Louder"	Louder	No	—N/a	Yes	Taeyang, Seo Won Jin, 24, Joe Rhee, Teddy	Yes	Seo Won Jin, 24
2018	Blackpink	"Ddu-Du Ddu-Du"	Square Up	No	—N/a	Yes	24, Teddy, Bekuh Boom	Yes	24, Teddy
2018	Blackpink	"Forever Young"	Square Up	No	—N/a	No	—N/a	Yes	24, Teddy, Future Bounce
2018	Blackpink	"See U Later"	Square Up	No	—N/a	Yes	24, Teddy	Yes	24
2018	Seungri	"Alone" (혼자 있는법)	The Great Seungri	No	—N/a	Yes	Seungri, 8!, Brian Lee	Yes	—N/a
2018	Seungri	"Good Luck to You"	The Great Seungri	No	—N/a	Yes	Seungri, Seo Won Jin, 24	Yes	Seo Won Jin, 24
2018	iKon	"Killing Me"	New Kids: Continue	No	—N/a	Yes	B.I, Joe Rhee	Yes	Joe Rhee
2018	iKon	"Adore You"	New Kids: The Final	No	—N/a	No	—N/a	Yes	Seo Won Jin
2019	Anda & R.Tee	"What You Waiting For"	non-album single	Yes	Joe Rhee, 1105	Yes	Joe Rhee, 1105	Yes	—N/a
2019	Blackpink	"Don't Know What to Do"	Kill This Love	No	—N/a	No	—N/a	Yes	24, Teddy
2019	Blackpink	"Kill This Love"	Kill This Love	No	—N/a	Yes	24, Teddy, Bekuh Boom	Yes	24, Teddy
2019	Imfact	"The Light" (빛나)	Only U	No	—N/a	Yes	Kim Ji-seon, Cha Wang-un	Yes	—N/a
2019	Jeon So-mi	"Birthday"	Birthday	No	—N/a	No	—N/a	Yes	24
2020	Winner	"Hold"	Remember	No	—N/a	Yes	Mino	Yes	—N/a
2020	Jeon So-mi	"What You Waiting For"	non-album single	No	—N/a	Yes	24, Jeon So-mi, Teddy	Yes	24
2020	Treasure	"Boy"	The First Step: Chapter One	No	—N/a	Yes	Choice37, Hea, Se.A	Yes	—N/a
2020	Treasure	"I Love You"	The First Step: Chapter Two	Yes	Yoshi, Choi Hyun-suk, Haruto	Yes	—N/a	Yes	Yena
2020	Blackpink	"How You Like That"	The Album	No	—N/a	Yes	24, Teddy	Yes	24
2020	Blackpink	"Pretty Savage"	The Album	No	—N/a	Yes	Teddy, 24, Bekuh Boom	Yes	Teddy, 24
2020	Blackpink	"Lovesick Girls"	The Album	No	—N/a	Yes	Teddy, 24, Jennie, Jisoo, Brian Lee, Leah Haywood, David Guetta	Yes	24
2020	Blackpink	"Crazy Over You"	The Album	No	—N/a	Yes	Teddy, Bekuh Boom, 24, Future Bounce	Yes	24, Future Bounce
2021	Lisa	"Money"	Lalisa	No	—N/a	Yes	24, Bekuh Boom, Vince	Yes	24
2022	Blackpink	"Pink Venom"	Born Pink	No	—N/a	Yes	24, Teddy, IDO	Yes	24, IDO
2022	Blackpink	"Yeah Yeah Yeah"	Born Pink	No	—N/a	Yes	Kush, VVN, IDO	Yes	Kush, IDO
2022	Blackpink	"Hard to Love"	Born Pink	No	—N/a	Yes	Freddy Wexler, Teddy, Bianca "Blush" Atterberry, Max Wolfgang, 24	Yes	24
2022	Huh	"Ugly Duckling" (feat. Sunwoo Jung-a, Bobby)	Show Me the Money 11	No	—N/a	Yes	JuniorChef, Huh, Para9on	Yes	JuniorChef, Sunwoo Jung-a
2023	Jisoo	"All Eyes on Me"	Me	No	—N/a	Yes	Teddy, 24, VVN	Yes	24
2023	Heize	"VingleVingle" (빙글빙글)	non-album single	No	—N/a	Yes	VVN, Kush, Heize	Yes	—N/a
2023	Taeyang	"Shoong!" (feat. Lisa)	Down to Earth	No	—N/a	No	—N/a	Yes	24, Vince, Dominsuk
2023	Taeyang	"Nightfall" (feat. Bryan Chase)	Down to Earth	No	—N/a	Yes	Kush, Vince, NOS, Bryan Chase, VVN	Yes	IDO, Kush, NOS, VVN

== Filmography ==
=== Television ===
Year	Title	Role	Ref.
2015	Headliner	Contestant	
2022	Show Me the Money 11	Producer	
