= Future Bounce =

South Korean producer duo

- Origin: South Korea
- Genres: K-pop; hip-hop; electropop; R&B; dance-pop
- Occupations: Record producers; songwriters
- Instruments: Vocals; drums; acoustic guitar; electric guitar; bass guitar; piano; electric piano; organ
- Years active: 2015–present
- Labels: YG
- Members: P.K; Dee.P

Future Bounce is a South Korean producer duo under YG Entertainment, consisting of P.K and Dee.P, formed in 2015. They have produced hits for Big Bang, Winner, iKon, Blackpink and Treasure and many other YG artists.

== Members ==
=== P.K ===
P.K (birth name: Choi Pil Kang (Korean: 최필강) was born on March 2, 1979.

=== Dee.P ===
Dee.P (birth name: Park Han-beom (Korean: 박한범) also known as Daniel Pak was born on June 3, 1983.

== Production discography ==
Before the duo's formation, both members often collaborated.

=== 2012 ===
Artist	Song	Album	Note
Big Bang	"Wings"	Alive	with G-Dragon

=== 2014 ===
Artist	Song	Album	Note
2NE1	"Come Back Home"	Crush	with Teddy
2NE1	"Come Back Home" (Unplugged version)	Crush	with Teddy
Taeyang	"Body" (아름다워; Areumdawo)	Rise	with Teddy and Taeyang
Taeyang	"Let Go" (버리고; Beorigo)	Rise	with Taeyang

=== 2015 ===
Artist	Song	Album	Note
BigBang	"If You"	D	with G-Dragon
Psy	Daddy	Chiljip Psy-da	with Teddy, Yoo Gun-hyung, Dominique Régiacorte, Jean-Luc Drion and will.i.am
iKon	"Airplane"	Welcome Back	with B.I
iKon	Dumb & Dumber	Welcome Back	with B.I
iKon	"Today" (오늘따라; Oneul Ttara)	Welcome Back	with B.I, Ham Seung-cheon and Kang Uk-jin

=== 2016 ===
Artist	Song	Album	Note
Blackpink	"Whistle"	Square One	with Teddy, B.I and Bekuh Boom
Mino	"Body" (몸; mom)	The MOBB	with Mino

=== 2017 ===
Artist	Song	Album	Note
Sechs Kies	"Be Well" (아프지마요)	The 20th Anniversary	with Tablo
Sechs Kies	"Sad Song" (슬픈노래)	The 20th Anniversary	with Tablo
Sechs Kies	"Three Words" (세 단어)	The 20th Anniversary	with Tablo
G-Dragon	"Bullshit" (개소리; gaesori)	Kwon Ji Yong	with G-Dragon, Teddy, Cawlr, Choice37 and 24
G-Dragon	"Super Star"	Kwon Ji Yong	with Teddy, G-Dragon, Joe Rhee, 24, Choice37 and Seo Won Jin
Blackpink	"As If It's Your Last"	Non-album single	with Teddy and Lydia Paek
Winner	"Love Me Love Me"	Our Twenty For	with Yoon and Mino
Winner	"Island"	Our Twenty For	with Yoon and Bekuh Boom
Taeyang	Darling	White Night	with Teddy, 8!, Brian Lee, Choice37, and Seo Won Jin
Sechs Kies	"Drinking Problem" (술끊자)	Another Light	with Tablo

=== 2018 ===
Artist	Song	Album	Note
iKon	"Best Friend"	Return	with Bekuh BOOM and B.I
Winner	"Turn Off the Light" (Mino solo; 손만 잡고 자자; sonman jabgo jaja)	Everyday	with Mino
Blackpink	Forever Young	Square Up	with Teddy and R.Tee
Seungri	"Where R U From" (feat. Mino)	The Great Seungri	with Seungri
Seungri	"Hotline"	The Great Seungri	with Seungri
Seungri	"Love Is You" (feat. Blue.D)	The Great Seungri	with Seungri and Luna tune
Seungri	"Mollado" (몰라도; mollado) (feat. B.I)	The Great Seungri	with Seungri and B.I
Seungri	"Be Friend"	The Great Seungri	with Seungri, Lee Seung Youb and Kim Sang Wook
iKon	"Goodbye Road" (이별길; ibyeolgil)	New Kids: The Final	with B.I and Bekuh BOOM
iKon	"Perfect" (꼴좋다; kkoljohda)	New Kids: The Final	with B.I
Mino	"Fiancé" (아낙네; anagne)	XX	with Mino and Texu
Mino	"Agree" (암; am)	XX	with Mino

=== 2019 ===
Artist	Song	Album	Note
iKon	"I'm OK"	The New Kids	with B.I
Eun Ji-won	"How We Do"	G1	with Eun Jiwon and Bigtone
Eun Ji-won	"I'm On Fire" (불나방) (feat. Blue.D)	G1	with Mino
Eun Ji-won	"Hate"	G1	with Leon
Viini	"Bittersweet" (짠해)	Dimension	with Viini
Viini	"Genie" (도깨비방망이)	Dimension	with Viini, iHwak and Leon
Winner	"Don't Be Shy" (끄덕끄덕; kkeudeogkkeudeog)	Cross	with Mino

=== 2020 ===
Artist	Song	Album	Note
Sechs Kies	"All for You"	All for You	with Andrew Choi
Sechs Kies	"Dream"	All for You	with godok
Sechs Kies	"Meaningless"	All for You	with Bigtone
Sechs Kies	"Round and Round"	All for You	with Bigtone
Sechs Kies	"Walking in the Sky"	All for You	with Bigtone
Winner	"My Bad"	Remember	with Mino
Bang Ye-dam	"Wayo" (왜요)	Non-album single	with Yoon and Andrew Choi
Blackpink	"Crazy Over You"	The Album	with Teddy, Bekuh BOOM, 24 and R. Tee
Mino	"Wa" (feat. Zion.T)	Take	with Mino
Treasure	"MMM" (음)	The First Step: Chapter Three	with AFTRSHOK, Czaer, Awry, Jan Baars, Nathan Lewis, and Brian U
Treasure	"Orange" (주황색)	The First Step: Chapter Three	with Asahi

=== 2021 ===
Artist	Song	Album	Note
Treasure	"My Treasure"	The First Step: Treasure Effect	with AFTRSHOK, Geist Way, CSCS, HKenneth, and pollock
Treasure	"Going Crazy"	The First Step: Treasure Effect	

=== 2022 ===
Artist	Song	Album	Note
Treasure	"Jikjin" (직진)	The Second Step: Chapter One	with Choice37, HAE, LIL G, LP, Se.A, and Sonny
