= Choi Hyun-suk =

South Korean rapper and singer (born 1999)

- 최현석
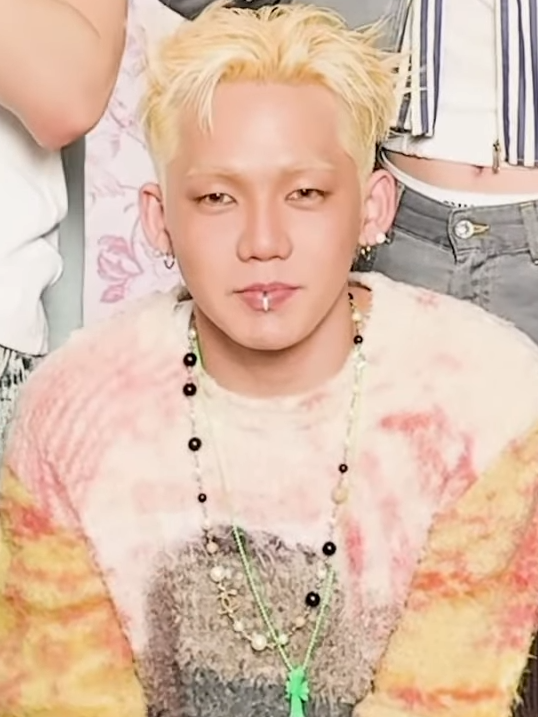
- Choi in 2025
- Born: April 21, 1999 (age 27); Daegu, South Korea
- Occupations: Rapper; singer; dancer
- Years active: 2020–present
- Musical career
- Genres: K-pop; hip hop
- Instrument: Vocals
- Label: YG
- Member of: Treasure

Korean name
- Hangul: 최현석
- RR: Choe Hyeonseok
- MR: Ch'oe Hyŏnsŏk

Choi Hyun-suk (Korean: 최현석; born April 21, 1999) is a South Korean rapper, singer and dancer under YG Entertainment. As a member of boy band Treasure, Choi debuted on August 7, 2020, with the single album entitled The First Step: Chapter One. He is also known for his television appearance as a contestant on Mix Nine (2017–2018).

== Life and career ==
=== 1999–2016: Early life ===
Choi Hyun-suk was born on April 21, 1999, in South Korea. He is the eldest in his family and has a younger sister. 8-year-old Choi (Korean age) first discovered rap and hip hop in first grade through Big Bang's documentary The Beginning (2006), and later through the work of Tupac and Eminem, also attending the latter's concert in Choi's country. In result, he solely fixated his eyes on the hip hop label, YG Entertainment. He formally encountered hip hop and began to dance at ages 11–12 and 13–14 (Korean ages), respectively, and soon aspired to become an artist; or alternatively become a footballer, stemmed by his interest in the sport in result of his stance as an avid fan of Real Madrid CF. Preceding his interest in hip hop, Choi also joined a choir in fifth grade, following a family tradition situated in elementary school, as a sopranist and won first place as its school representative in contests.

In his adolescence, he enrolled at an academy for lessons and attended a private audition held by YG Entertainment through the facility; as a result, Choi was successfully recruited in its trainee program in 2015.

=== 2017–present: Career beginnings and debut with Treasure ===
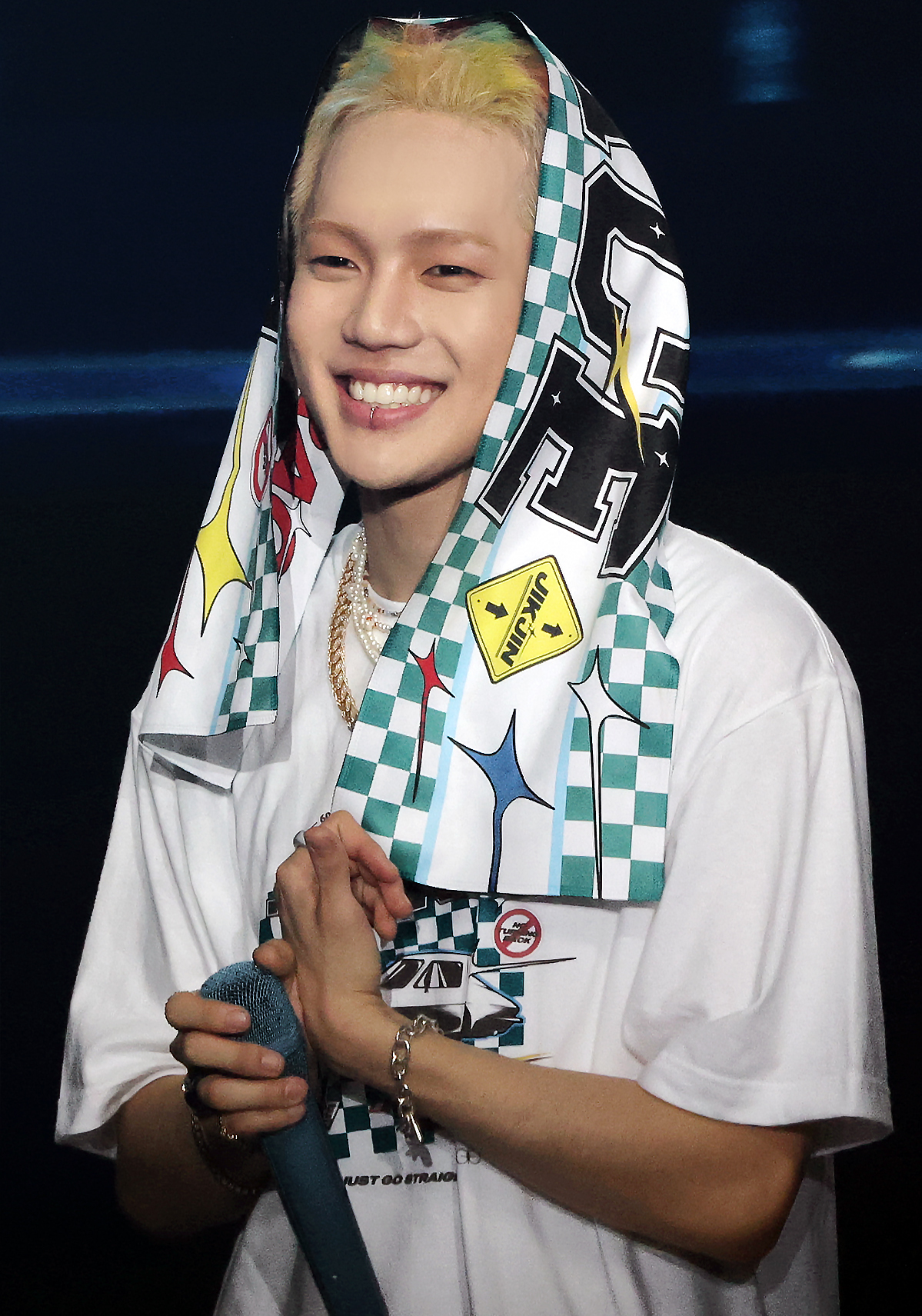
Choi performing at the Trace concert in April 2022

Choi first appeared on television through Mix Nine (2017–2018) with band-mate, Kim Jun-kyu, and Lee Byoung-gon of CIX. He participated as a contestant representing YG Entertainment amidst his training and finished the show in fifth place, earning a place in the final line-up. The winning contestants' agencies, however, were unable to reach an agreement regarding the tenure of the project band, leading to the abolishment of its debut. Choi was also incorporated in the third episode of YG Future Strategy Office (2018) as himself that same year while filmed alongside other trainees from the agency.

20-year-old Choi (Korean age) competed in YG Treasure Box (2018–2019), a survival reality program composed of twenty nine trainees, as one of seven under "Team A". The broadcast documented the formation of YG Entertainment's next boy band, Treasure. He became the seventh and last member to join the septet, however, with the announcement of a second line-up and the ensuing merge, the initial septet became the eventual 12-piece ensemble. Choi was notified of his addition to the band from his parents subsequently after its revelation by news articles.

In the midst of its preparation for debut, Choi featured on the B-side single, "1, 2" (한두번; handubeon) by label-mate Lee Hi from her extended play titled 24°C and participated as its lyricist. He also served as an "unofficial leader" with Jihoon in their respective teams when they were divided into two for training due to the number of members. His training period came to an end after five years, followed his debut in Treasure on August 7, 2020, with the single album entitled The First Step: Chapter One. The band adopted the two-tier leadership with Choi and Jihoon after witnessing positive aspects from the once temporary system.

== Other ventures ==
=== Endorsements ===
In January 2018, Choi modeled for Japanese sports clothing and accessories brand, Descente, for their new semester menswear range.

=== Philanthropy ===
Choi participated in the "News 1 Bazaar of Love" (2022) following an invitation by the South Korean news agency, News 1. Its proceeds were allocated towards treatment and care of children with severe, rare, and intractable diseases, and children of low-income families through items from various celebrities.

== Discography ==
=== Other charted songs ===
List of other charted songs, showing year released, selected chart positions and album name
Title	Year	Peak positions	Album
Title	Year	KOR	Album
"1, 2" (한두번) (Lee Hi featuring Choi Hyun-suk)	2019	171	24°C

=== Songwriting credits ===
All song credits are adapted from the Korea Music Copyright Association's database, unless otherwise noted.

==== Work as Treasure ====
Year	Song	Album	Lyricist		Composer	
Year	Song	Album	Credited	With	Credited	With
2020	"Boy"	The First Step: Treasure Effect	Yes	R.Tee, Se.A, Lil G, Choice37	Yes	R.Tee, Se.A, Hae, Lil G, Choice37
2020	"Come to Me" (들어와)	The First Step: Treasure Effect	Yes	Rovin, Kim Kyung, Bigtone	No	–
2020	"I Love You" (사랑해)	The First Step: Treasure Effect	Yes	R.Tee, Yoshi, Haruto	No	–
2020	"B.L.T" (Bling Like This)	The First Step: Treasure Effect	Yes	Kim Dong Joon, Trnc 95, Yoshi, Haruto	No	–
2020	"Mmm" (음)	The First Step: Treasure Effect	Yes	Godok	No	–
2020	"Orange" (오렌지)	The First Step: Treasure Effect	Yes	Asahi, Haruto	No	–
2021	"My Treasure"	The First Step: Treasure Effect	Yes	Bigtone, Min Yeon-jae, Haruto, Yoshi	No	–
2021	"Be With Me" (나랑 있자)	The First Step: Treasure Effect	Yes	Rovin, Kim Kyung, Haruto, Yoshi	No	–
2021	"Slowmotion"	The First Step: Treasure Effect	Yes	Lee Chan-hyuk, Haruto	No	–
2022	"BFF"	The Second Step: Chapter One	Yes	MGNTK, (Note: Consists of producers: Kim Seung-nam, Yoon Jung-hwan, Ahn Do-hyung, Lee Ji-ho, Kim Min-ki, and Lee Seung-hoon) Kang Kyu-Yong	Yes	MGNTK, Kang Kyu-Yong
2022	"Jikjin" (직진)	The Second Step: Chapter One	Yes	Sonny, Lil G, Choice37, LP, Hae, Yoshi, Haruto, Se.A	Yes	Choice37, LP, Sonny, Future Bounce, Hae, Se.A, Yoshi, Haruto
2022	"U"	The Second Step: Chapter One	Yes	Nu.D, Sonny, LP, Lil G, Choice37, Hae, Haruto, Yoshi	Yes	Choice37, Hae, Sonny, LP, Lil G, Nu.D, Haruto, Yoshi
2022	"Darari" (다라리)	The Second Step: Chapter One	Yes	Jaguaa, Bang Ye-dam, Choice37, Lil G, LP, Yoshi, Sonny, Hae, Se.A, Haruto	Yes	Choice37, Hae, Jaguaa, Bang Ye-dam, Yoshi, Sonny, LP, Lil G, Haruto
2022	"It's Okay" (괜찮아질 거야)	The Second Step: Chapter One	Yes	Kid Wine, Airplay, Haruto, Yoshi	No	–
2022	"Hello"	The Second Step: Chapter Two	Yes	Choice37, Sonny, Lil G, LP, Hae, Yoshi, Haruto	Yes	Choice37, Hae, LP, Sonny, Lil G, Dee.P, Yoshi, Haruto
2022	"VolKno"	The Second Step: Chapter Two	Yes	Yoshi, Haruto	Yes	Dee.P, Yoshi, Haruto
2022	"Clap!"	The Second Step: Chapter Two	Yes	Asahi, Yoshi, Haruto	No	–
2022	"Hold It In"	The Second Step: Chapter Two	Yes	–	Yes	YJ, Dee.P, Rovin
2023	"Bona Bona"	Reboot	Yes	Lee Chan-hyuk, Yoshi, Haruto, Where The Noise, Junkyu, Dan Whittemore, Jared Lee	No	–
2023	"I Want Your Love"	Reboot	Yes	Haruto, Junkyu, Ludwig Lindell, Jarred Lee	No	–
2023	"Run"	Reboot	Yes	LP, Sonny, Hae, Lil G, Yoshi, Haruto, Choice 37	Yes	LP, Sonny, Hae, Lil G, Yoshi, Haruto, Choice 37
2023	"G.O.A.T"	Reboot	Yes	Yoshi, Haruto	Yes	Yoshi, Haruto, Dee.P
2023	"Stupid" (멍청이)	Reboot	Yes	Yoshi, Haruto	No	–
2023	"Wonderland"	Reboot	Yes	Lee Chanhyuk, Yoshi, Haruto, Junkyu	No	–
2023	"Lovesick" (병)	Reboot	Yes	Yoshi, Haruto, Asahi	No	–

==== Other artists ====
Year	Artist(s)	Song	Album	Lyricist		Composer	
Year	Artist(s)	Song	Album	Credited	With	Credited	With
2019	Lee Hi	"1, 2" (한두번)	24°C	Yes	B.I	No	–
2023	Babymonster	"Batter Up"	Babymons7er	Yes	Jared Lee, YG, Asa, Lee Chan-hyuk, Where The Noise, Bigtone	No	–
2024	Babymonster	"Sheesh"	Babymons7er	Yes	Choice37, Sonny, Lil G, LP, Sandra Wikström	Yes	Choice37, LP, YG, Sonny, Lil G, Sandra Wikström

== Filmography ==
=== Television series ===
Year	Title		Role	Notes
Year	English	Korean	Role	Notes
2018	YG Future Strategy Office	YG 전략자료본부	Himself	Cameo; uncredited

=== Web series ===
Year	Title		Role	Notes	Ref.
Year	English	Korean	Role	Notes	Ref.
2021	The Mysterious Class	남고괴담	Choi Hyun-suk	Main cast	

=== Television shows ===
Year	Title		Role	Notes	Ref.
Year	English	Korean	Role	Notes	Ref.
2017–2018	Mix Nine	믹스나인	Contestant	Finished in fifth place	
2018–2019	YG Treasure Box	YG 보석함	Contestant	Formation of Treasure	
2022	The Idol Ramyeonators	라끼돌	Cast member	with Jihoon	
