= The First Step: Chapter One =

- Digital cover

Single album by Treasure
- Released: August 7, 2020
- Genres: Dance-pop; hip hop
- Length: 6:41 (Digital); 13:22 (Physical)
- Label: YG
- Producers: Choice37; HAE; Rovin; R.Tee; Se.A

Treasure chronology
The First Step: Chapter One (2020)	The First Step: Chapter Two (2020)

Singles from The First Step: Chapter One
- 1. "Boy" Released: August 7, 2020

The First Step: Chapter One is the debut single album by South Korean boy band Treasure. It was released digitally on August 7, 2020 and physically on August 13, through YG Entertainment. A music video for the album's only single "Boy" was released alongside the album. The First Step: Chapter One is the first of 'The First Step' series. The single album debuted atop the Gaon Albums Chart and sold more than 200,000 copies in South Korea.

== Background and release ==
The band was formed by YG Entertainment through the reality show YG Treasure Box. In May 2020, it was announced that the group would debut in July. On July 13, 2020, YG uploaded the first teaser for the album. In the following days various teasers were uploaded to their social media profiles. The album's title and release day were revealed on July 20, the tracklist was revealed 10 days later and a teaser for the music video for "Boy" was published on August 5. The First Step: Chapter One was released digitally in various countries on August 7, 2020 18:00 KST, alongside the music video for the single "Boy". Two physical versions titled "Black Ver." and "White Ver." were made available on August 13.

== Music and critical reception ==
The album's lead single "Boy" is a hip hop song whose lyrics describe a male protagonist who tries to make a girl fall for him. An accompanying music video for the song was directed by Dongju Jang and Rima Yoon published simultaneously with the album's release. An uncredited writer for the Japanese online magazine Encount called the song and its music video "gorgeous yet dynamic" for a hip hop bound label like YG and that the dance is a "masterpiece". A writer for Wow! Korea described the song "with strong beats and [an] addictive sound" and called the lyrics in which the boy expresses strong love "impressive".

== Commercial performance ==
On July 31, the group's label announced that The First Step: Chapter One has surpassed 100,000 stock pre-orders in two days. Three days later, it was revealed that pre-orders have surpassed 150,000 copies. The single album debuted atop the Gaon Album Chart on the 33rd issued week of 2020. It sold 160,614 copies in its release week; the second biggest sales week for a rookie group in 2020. The album ranked second on the monthly album chart of September, selling 218,118 copies in three weeks.

The album's single "Boy" debuted at number seven on the Billboard World Digital Song Sales, while "Come to Me" reached number ten.

== Track listing ==
Credits adapted from the liner notes:

The First Step: Chapter One track listing
No.	Title	Lyrics	Music	Arrangement	Length
1.	"Boy"	Se.A; Choice37; Choi Hyun-suk; Haruto	Choice37; R.Tee; Hae; Se.A	R.Tee	3:16
2.	"Come to Me" (들어와; Deureowa; 'Come in')	Rovin; Kim Kyung; Bigtone; Choi Hyun-suk; Yoshi; Haruto	Rovin	Rovin	3:24
Total length:					6:41

The First Step: Chapter One – CD track listing
No.	Title	Lyrics	Music	Arrangement	Length
1.	"Boy"	Se.A; Choice37; Choi Hyun-suk; Haruto	Choice37; R.Tee; Hae; Se.A	R.Tee	3:16
2.	"Come to Me" (들어와; Deureowa; 'Come in')	Rovin; Kim Kyung; Bigtone; Choi Hyun-suk; Yoshi; Haruto	Rovin	Rovin	3:24
3.	"Boy" (Instrumental)		Choice37; R.Tee; Hae; Se.A	R.Tee	3:16
4.	"Come to Me" (Instrumental)		Rovin	Rovin	3:24
Total length:					13:20

== Charts ==
=== Weekly charts ===
Chart (2020)	Peak position
South Korean Albums (Gaon)	1

=== Monthly charts ===
Chart (2020)	Peak position
South Korean Albums (Gaon)	2

=== Year-end charts ===
Chart (2020)	Position
South Korean Albums (Gaon)	39

== Certifications and sales ==
Sales certifications for The First Step: Chapter One
Region	Certification	Certified units/sales
South Korea (KMCA)	Platinum	250,000^{^}
^{^} Shipments figures based on certification alone.

== Release history ==
Country	Date	Format(s)	Label
Various	August 7, 2020	Digital download; streaming	YG
South Korea	August 13, 2020	CD single	YG
Japan	August 21, 2020	CD single	YG
