= YGEX =

Japanese record label

- Parent company: Avex Inc.
- Founded: April 12, 2011; 15 years ago
- Founder: Max Matsuura; Yang Hyun-suk
- Distributor: Avex Entertainment
- Genre: K-pop; J-pop
- Country of origin: Japan
- Location: Tokyo, Japan
- Official website: ygex.jp/treasure

YGEX is a Japanese record label. A subsidiary of the Avex Group, it is headquartered in Tokyo, Japan. It was founded on April 12, 2011 by Japanese record company Avex Group and South Korean entertainment company YG Entertainment, making history as the first Korean entertainment company to establish a record label in Japan. The label's name YGEX is a portmanteau of the companies involved, YG Entertainment and AVEX, and has two meanings: "EXPERIENCE" and "EXCLUSIVE".

== Overview ==
The label is exclusively for singers signed to YG Entertainment. The purpose of setting up a dedicated label is to protect YG's musicality as it is. YG was more reluctant to expand into Japan than other companies in South Korea. This is because it was a burden to abandon the musical characteristics of the company and "Make it into Japanese music" when entering Japan. By setting up a dedicated label there, YG's musical commitment was protected. At the launch of the label, avex's Max Matsuura chairman stated that he would establish a "YGEX sound" that is neither K-POP nor J-POP.

== Artists ==
- Blackpink
- Treasure

== Former artists ==
- SE7EN
- Gummy
- 2NE1
- Psy
- Epik High
- Lee Hi
- V.I (BIGBANG) – Retired from the entertainment industry in March 2019.
- B.I (iKon)
- GD & TOP
- iKon
- Big Bang
  - T.O.P
  - D-LITE
  - G-Dragon
  - SOL
- Winner
- Sechs Kies
