= AKMU discography =

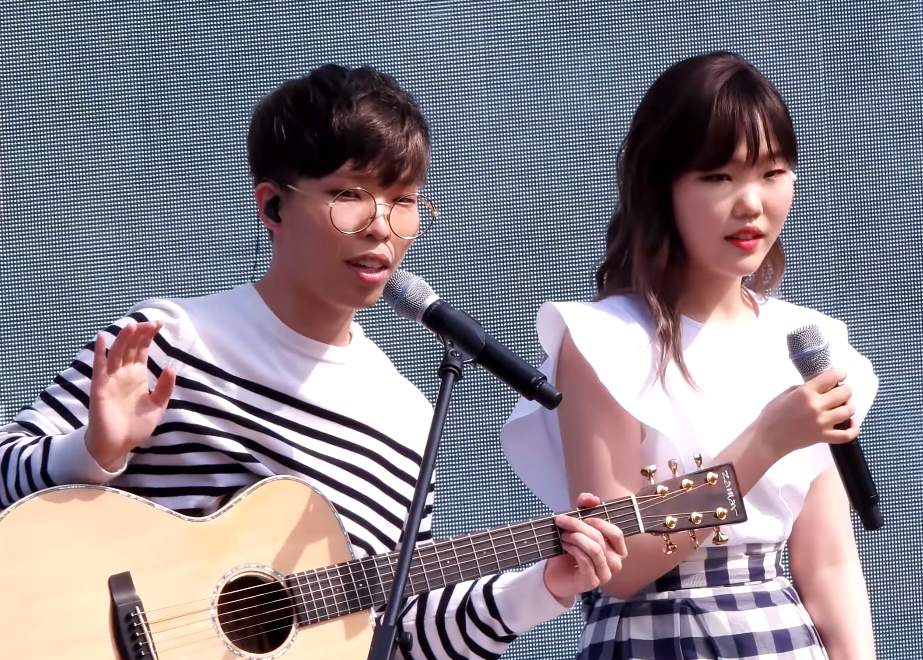
- AKMU in 2016
- Studio albums: 4
- EPs: 3
- Live albums: 1
- Singles: 16
- Music videos: 25
- Single albums: 1

South Korean sibling duo AKMU has released four studio albums, one live album, three extended plays, one single album, and sixteen singles. The duo debuted under YG Entertainment in 2014 after they won the second installment of the K-pop Star series. The duo consists of siblings Lee Chan-hyuk and Lee Su-hyun.

Songs from the group's 2014 debut album Play have more than 6.9 million total downloads. As of January 2018, the duo sold over 23 million digital songs in South Korea.

== Albums ==
=== Studio albums ===
List of studio albums, with selected chart positions and sales
Title	Details	Peak chart positions			Sales
Title	Details	KOR	US Heat.	US World	Sales
Play	Released: April 7, 2014; Label: YG Entertainment; Formats: CD, digital download	1	20	2	KOR: 36,522
Winter	Released: January 3, 2017; Label: YG Entertainment; Formats: CD, digital download	8	—	7	KOR: 9,910
Sailing	Released: September 25, 2019; Label: YG Entertainment; Formats: CD, LP, digital download	4	—	—	KOR: 10,531
Flowering	Released: April 7, 2026; Label: Cemter of Inspiration; Formats: CD, digital download	14	—	—	KOR: 14,456
"—" denotes a recording that did not chart or was not released in that territory.

=== Live albums ===
List of live albums
Title	Details
AKMU 'Sailing' Tour Live	Released: July 3, 2020; Label: YG Entertainment; Formats: digital download, streaming

== Extended plays ==
List of extended plays, with selected chart positions, and sales
Title	Details	Peak chart positions		Sales
Title	Details	KOR	US World	Sales
Spring	Released: May 4, 2016; Label: YG Entertainment; Formats: CD, digital download	7	5	KOR: 11,172
Next Episode	Released: July 26, 2021; Label: YG Entertainment; Formats: CD, LP, digital download	6	—	KOR: 19,822
Love Episode	Released: June 3, 2024; Label: YG Entertainment; Formats: CD, digital download	25	—	KOR: 9,789
"—" denotes a recording that did not chart or was not released in that territory.

== Single albums ==
List of single albums
Title	Details
Summer Episode	Released: July 20, 2017; Label: YG Entertainment; Formats: digital download, streaming

== Singles ==
=== As lead artist ===
List of singles, with selected chart positions, showing year released, sales, certifications and album name
Title	Year	Peak chart positions				Sales	Certifications (Note: In April 2018, the Korea Music Content Association introduced music recording certifications for albums and singles.)	Album
Title	Year	KOR	KOR Bill. (Note: The K-pop Hot 100 was discontinued on July 16, 2014. The chart was later re-established following the term date of May 29 – June 4, 2017.)	US World	WW	Sales	Certifications	Album
"200%"	2014	1	1	5	—	KOR: 1,862,000	—N/a	Play
"Melted" (얼음들)	2014	5	8	21	—	KOR: 773,000	—N/a	Play
"Give Love"	2014	4	3	—	—	KOR: 1,303,000	—N/a	Play
"Time and Fallen Leaves" (시간과 낙엽)	2014	1	—	6	—	KOR: 722,000	—N/a	Non-album single
"Re-Bye"	2016	1	—	—	—	KOR: 942,000	—N/a	Spring
"How People Move" (사람들이 움직이는 게)	2016	3	—	—	—	KOR: 691,000	—N/a	Spring
"Last Goodbye" (오랜 날 오랜 밤)	2017	2	30	—	—	KOR: 2,500,000	—N/a	Winter
"Reality" (리얼리티)	2017	17	—	—	—	KOR: 414,000	—N/a	Winter
"Dinosaur"	2017	6	30	9	—	KOR: 788,000	—N/a	Summer Episode
"My Darling"	2017	22	49	—	—	KOR: 171,000	—N/a	Summer Episode
"How Can I Love the Heartbreak, You're the One I Love" (어떻게 이별까지 사랑하겠어, 널 사랑하는 거지)	2019	1	1	—	—	KOR: 2,500,000	KMCA: Platinum (dig.); KMCA: 3× Platinum (st.)	Sailing
"Happening"	2020	17	23	—	—	—N/a	—N/a	Non-album single
"Nakka" (낙하) (with IU)	2021	1	1	—	—	—N/a	KMCA: Platinum (st.)	Next Episode
"Love Lee"	2023	1	2	—	91	—N/a	KMCA: Platinum (st.)	Love Episode
"Hero"	2024	67	—	—	—	—N/a	—N/a	Love Episode
"Joy, Sorrow, a Beautiful Heart" (기쁨, 슬픔, 아름다운 마음)	2026	1	—	—	— (Note: "Joy, Sorrow, a Beautiful Heart" did not enter the Billboard Global 200, but peaked at number 126 on the Global Excl. US.)	—N/a	—N/a	Flowering
"—" denotes releases that did not chart or were not released in that region.

=== Collaborations ===
List of collaborations, with selected chart positions, showing year released, sales and album name
Title	Year	Peak chart positions	Sales	Album
Title	Year	KOR	Sales	Album
"The Tree" (나무) (with Yang Hee-eun)	2017	62	KOR: 28,922+	The Unexpected Meeting Part 8

=== Promotional singles ===
List of promotional singles, with selected chart positions, showing year released, sales and album name
Title	Year	Peak chart positions		Sales	Album
Title	Year	KOR	KOR Hot	Sales	Album
"Don't Cross Your Legs" (다리꼬지마)	2012	2	2	KOR: 1,367,000	K-pop Star Season 2: Don't Cross Your Legs
"You Are Attractive" (매력있어)	2012	1	2	KOR: 1,243,000	K-pop Star Season 2: You Are Attractive
"Is It Ramen?" (라면인건가)	2013	3	2	KOR: 815,000	K-pop Star Season 2 Top 10 Part 1
"Crescendo" (크레셴도)	2013	1	2	KOR: 1,272,000	K-pop Star Season 2 Top 6
"Love in the Milky Way Cafe" (사랑은 은하수 다방에서)	2013	11	14	KOR: 540,000	K-pop Star Season 2 Top 4
"Foreigner's Confession" (외국인의 고백)	2013	4	6	KOR: 914,000	K-pop Star Season 2 Top 3 Part 2
"Officially Missing You"	2013	11	11	KOR: 580,000	K-pop Star Season 2 Top 2 Special
"Bean Ice Flakes with Rice Cake" (콩떡빙수)	2013	3	2	KOR: 759,000	Non-album promotional single
"Dada"	2025	— (Note: "Dada" did not enter the Circle Digital Chart, but topped at number 11 on the component Download Chart.)	—	—N/a	Non-album promotional single
"—" denotes releases that did not chart or were not released in that region.

=== As featured artist ===
List of singles as featured artist, with selected chart positions, showing year released and album name
Title	Year	Peak chart positions		Album
Title	Year	KOR	KOR Hot	Album
"Dissonance" (불협화음) (Mudd the Student featuring AKMU)	2021	4	5	Show Me the Money 10 Semi Final

== Soundtrack appearances ==
List of soundtrack appearances, with selected chart positions, showing year released, sales and album name
Title	Year	Peak chart positions		Sales	Album
Title	Year	KOR	KOR Hot	Sales	Album
"I Love You"	2013	3	3	KOR: 1,131,000	All About My Romance OST
"Be With You"	2016	20	—	KOR: 147,000	Moon Lovers: Scarlet Heart Ryeo OST
"—" denotes releases that did not chart or were not released in that region.

== Other charted songs ==
List of other charted songs, with selected chart positions, showing year released, sales and album name
Title	Year	Peak chart positions			Sales	Album
Title	Year	KOR	KOR Hot	WW Excl. US	Sales	Album
"On the Subway" (지하철에서)	2014	10	15	—	KOR: 425,026	Play
"Hair Part" (가르마)	2014	15	26	—	KOR: 322,293	Play
"Artificial Grass" (인공잔디)	2014	9	12	—	KOR: 455,206	Play
"Don't Hate Me" (안녕)	2014	12	21	—	KOR: 343,658	Play
"Little Star" (작은별)	2014	11	13	—	KOR: 415,665	Play
"Anyway" (길이나)	2014	16	22	—	KOR: 353,260	Play
"Idea" (소재)	2014	17	31	—	KOR: 300,110	Play
"Galaxy"	2014	14	20	—	KOR: 365,405	Play
"Haughty Girl" (새삼스럽게 왜)	2016	6	—	—	KOR: 399,124	Spring
"Green Window" (초록창가)	2016	8	—	—	KOR: 318,247	Spring
"Every Little Thing" (사소한 것에서)	2016	10	—	—	KOR: 286,557	Spring
"Around" (주변인)	2016	11	—	—	KOR: 278,144	Spring
"Live" (생방송)	2017	29	—	—	KOR: 130,994	Winter
"Play Ugly" (못생긴 척)	2017	28	—	—	KOR: 143,068	Winter
"Chocolady"	2017	35	—	—	KOR: 129,262	Winter
"You Know Me"	2017	36	—	—	KOR: 109,259	Winter
"Way Back Home" (집에 돌아오는 길)	2017	25	—	—	KOR: 171,785	Winter
"Will Last Forever" (그때 그 아이들은)	2017	24	—	—	KOR: 197,586	Winter
"Chantey" (뱃노래)	2019	31	39	—	—N/a	Sailing
"Fish in the Water" (물 만난 물고기)	2019	33	42	—	—N/a	Sailing
"Moon" (달)	2019	17	38	—	—N/a	Sailing
"Freedom"	2019	30	44	—	—N/a	Sailing
"Should've Loved You More" (더 사랑해줄걸)	2019	49	50	—	—N/a	Sailing
"Whale" (고래)	2019	53	52	—	—N/a	Sailing
"Endless Dream, Good Night" (밤 끝없는 밤)	2019	37	49	—	—N/a	Sailing
"Farewell" (작별 인사)	2019	58	56	—	—N/a	Sailing
"Let's Take Time" (시간을 갖자)	2019	55	55	—	—N/a	Sailing
"Hey Kid, Close Your Eyes" (전쟁터) (with Lee Sun-hee)	2021	24	15	—	—N/a	Next Episode
"Bench" (with Zion.T)	2021	36	32	—	—N/a	Next Episode
"Tictoc Tictoc Tictoc" (째깍 째깍 째깍) (with Beenzino)	2021	31	22	—	—N/a	Next Episode
"Next Episode" (맞짱) (with Choi Jung-hoon)	2021	54	50	—	—N/a	Next Episode
"Stupid Love Song" (with Crush)	2021	40	36	—	—N/a	Next Episode
"Everest" (with Sam Kim)	2021	60	48	—	—N/a	Next Episode
"Fry's Dream" (후라이의 꿈)	2023	2	—	—	—N/a	Love Episode
"Long D" (롱디)	2024	125	—	—	—N/a	Love Episode
"Peace of Cake" (케익의 평화)	2024	175	—	—	—N/a	Love Episode
"Answer Me" (답답해)	2024	164	—	—	—N/a	Love Episode
"Paradise of Rumors" (소문의 낙원)	2026	1	—	169	—N/a	Flowering
"Spring Colors" (봄 색깔)	2026	31	—	—	—N/a	Flowering
"Paid with Bugs" (벌레를 내고)	2026	40	—	—	—N/a	Flowering
"Sunshine Bless You" (햇빛 bless you)	2026	38	—	—	—N/a	Flowering
"Tent"	2026	104	—	—	—N/a	Flowering
"Young and Married" (어린 부부)	2026	109	—	—	—N/a	Flowering
"The Right Person" (옳은 사람)	2026	122	—	—	—N/a	Flowering
"Graceful Breakfast" (우아한 아침 식사)	2026	130	—	—	—N/a	Flowering
"Festival of Refugees" (난민들의 축제)	2026	142	—	—	—N/a	Flowering
"Stains" (얼룩)	2026	139	—	—	—N/a	Flowering
"—" denotes releases that did not chart or were not released in that region.

== Music videos ==
List of music videos, showing year released and directors
Title	Year	Director
"I Love You"	2013	Unknown
"Bean Ice Flakes with Rice Cake"	2013	Unknown
"200%"	2014	Yongi
"Melted"	2014	Dee Shin
"Give Love"	2014	Yongi
"Re-Bye"	2016	Naive Creative Production
"How People Move"	2016	Beomjin (VM Project Architecture)
"Last Goodbye"	2017	Unknown
"Play Ugly" (Lyric video)	2017	Isaac
"Dinosaur"	2017	Dee Shin
"How Can I Love the Heartbreak, You're the One I Love"	2019	Visualfrom
"Fish in the Water" (Lyric video)	2019	Unknown
"Happening"	2020	Unknown
"Hey Kid, Close Your Eyes"	2021	Hobin
"Nakka"	2021	Hobin
"Stupid Love Song"	2021	Tezo Don Lee
"Tictoc Tictoc Tictoc"	2021	Hobin
"Bench"	2021	Hobin
"Next Episode"	2021	Hobin
"Everest"	2021	Hobin
"Love Lee"	2023	Kim In-tae
"Fry's Dream" (Lyric video)	2023	Unknown
"Hero"	2024	Kim In-tae
"Joy, Sorrow, A Beautiful Heart"	2026	Kim In-tae
"Paradise of Rumors"	2026	Unknown
