= List of songs written by Lee Chan-hyuk =

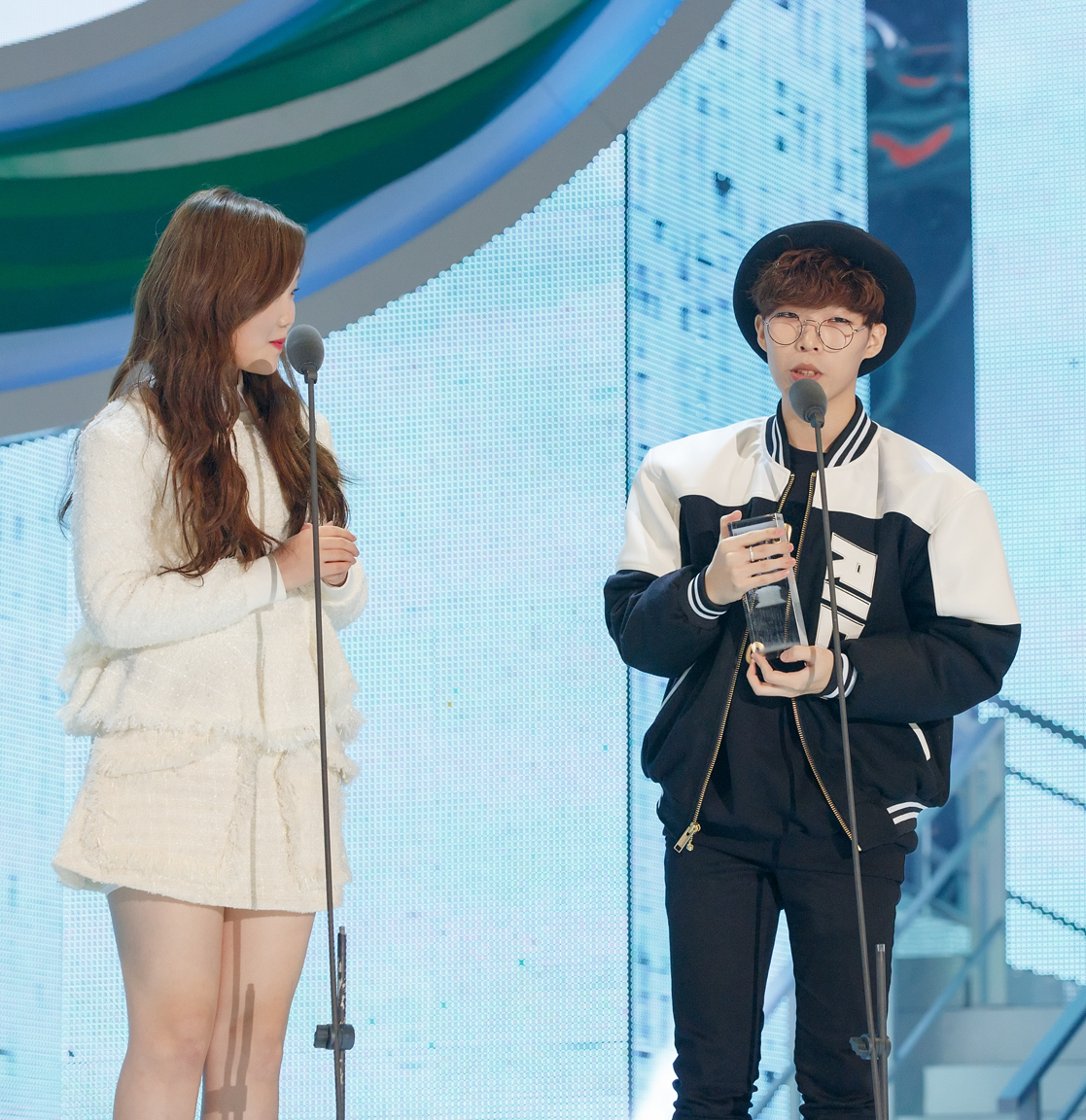
Lee and his sister Su-hyun accepting "Best Folk Award" at the 2014 Melon Music Awards for the AKMU's single "200%", written solely by Lee.

Lee Chan-hyuk (Korean: 이찬혁; born September 12, 1996), is a South Korean singer-songwriter, producer and author. He debuted as a member of the sibling duo AKMU in April 2014, under YG Entertainment.

Throughout AKMU's participation in K-pop Star 2 and following their debut in 2014, Lee Chan-hyuk has assumed the primary songwriting and composing responsibilities for all music released by the duo.

Branching out as a solo artist in 2022, Lee Chan-hyuk produced and released one studio album - Error (2022), one single - 1 Trillion (2024), along with a video project album titled Umbrella (2023) under the project group Leechanhyukvideo. Notably, his first studio album, Error, won the Best Pop Album category at the 20th Korean Music Awards.

Lee Chan-hyuk was promoted to a full member of the Korea Music Copyright Association (KOMCA) in January 2019. As of November 2026, 166 songs have been attributed to him as a songwriter and composer.

== Released songs ==
Key
†	Indicates single
#	Indicates a release for promotional advertisements
‡	Indicates a non-commercial release

=== 2012 ===
Song	Artist	Album	Lyrics		Music		Arrangement	
Song	Artist	Album	Credited	With	Credited	With	Credited	With
"Galaxy" (갤럭시) ‡	AKMU	2012 PTM 1ST COMPILATION-GALAXY	Yes	—N/a	Yes	—N/a	Yes	—N/a
"Don't Cross Your Legs" (다리꼬지마) †	AKMU	SBS K-POP Star Season 2: Don't Cross Your Legs	Yes	—N/a	Yes	—N/a	Yes	—N/a
"You Are Attractive" (매력있어) †	AKMU	SBS K-POP Star Season 2: You Are Attractive	Yes	—N/a	Yes	—N/a	Yes	—N/a

=== 2013 ===
Song	Artist	Album	Lyrics		Music		Arrangement	
Song	Artist	Album	Credited	With	Credited	With	Credited	With
"All-IP Song" (올아이피 송) #	AKMU	Non-album single	Yes	—N/a	Yes	—N/a	Yes	—N/a
"Is It Ramen?" (라면인건가)	AKMU	SBS K-pop Star Season 2 Top 10 Part 1	Yes	—N/a	Yes	—N/a	No	Go Young-hwan, Seo Eui-beom
"Crescendo" (크레셴도)	AKMU	SBS K-pop Star Season 2 Top 6	Yes	—N/a	Yes	—N/a	No	Go Young-hwan, Seo Eui-beom
"Love in the Milky Way Cafe" (사랑은 은하수 다방에서)	AKMU	SBS K-pop Star Season 2 Top 4	Yes	10cm	No	10cm	No	Go Young-hwan, Seo Eui-beom
"The Love Of Foreigner" (외국인의고백) †	AKMU	SBS K-pop Star Season 2 Top 3 Part 2	Yes	—N/a	Yes	—N/a	No	Go Young-hwan, Seo Eui-beom
"I Love You" †	AKMU	All About My Romance OST Part 3	Yes	—N/a	Yes	—N/a	No	Denis Seo, Shin Seung-ik
"Bean Ice Flakes with Rice Cake" (콩떡빙수) † #	AKMU	Non-album single	Yes	—N/a	Yes	—N/a	No	Go Young-hwan, Seo Eui-beom
"A Happy World" (행복한세상) ‡	AKMU	Non-album single	Yes	—N/a	Yes	—N/a	No	—N/a
"Double Song" (2배 송) #	AKMU	Non-album single	Yes	—N/a	Yes	—N/a	Yes	—N/a
"Every Little Thing" (사소한 것에서) #	AKMU	Non-album single	Yes	—N/a	Yes	—N/a	No	Denis Seo, Shin Seung-ik
"Is It Ramen? (Shake Mix)" (라면인건가(쉐이크믹스)) #	AKMU	Non-album single	Yes	—N/a	Yes	—N/a	No	Denis Seo, Shin Seung-ik

=== 2014 ===
Song	Artist	Album	Lyrics		Music		Arrangement	
Song	Artist	Album	Credited	With	Credited	With	Credited	With
"Give Love" †	AKMU	PLAY	Yes	—N/a	Yes	—N/a	No	Denis Seo, Shin Seung-ik
"200%" †	AKMU	PLAY	Yes	—N/a	Yes	—N/a	Yes	Rovin
"Melted" (얼음들) †	AKMU	PLAY	Yes	—N/a	Yes	—N/a	Yes	Rovin
"On The Subway" (지하철에서)	AKMU	PLAY	Yes	—N/a	Yes	—N/a	No	Rovin
"Hair Part" (가르마)	AKMU	PLAY	Yes	—N/a	Yes	—N/a	No	Rovin
"Artificial Grass" (인공잔디)	AKMU	PLAY	Yes	—N/a	Yes	—N/a	No	Rovin
"Don't Hate Me" (안녕)	AKMU	PLAY	Yes	—N/a	Yes	—N/a	No	Philtre
"Little Star" (지하철에서)	AKMU	PLAY	Yes	—N/a	Yes	—N/a	No	Rovin
"Anyway" (길이나)	AKMU	PLAY	Yes	—N/a	Yes	—N/a	No	Denis Seo, Shin Seung-ik
"Idea" (소재)	AKMU	PLAY	Yes	—N/a	Yes	—N/a	No	Rovin
"Galaxy"	AKMU	PLAY	Yes	—N/a	Yes	—N/a	No	Denis Seo, Shin Seung-ik
"Time and Fallen Leaves" (시간과 낙엽) †	AKMU	Non-album single	Yes	—N/a	Yes	—N/a	No	—N/a

=== 2015 ===
Song	Artist	Album	Lyrics		Music		Arrangement	
Song	Artist	Album	Credited	With	Credited	With	Credited	With
"Think About You" (널 생각해) †	Younha	Non-album single	Yes	—N/a	Yes	—N/a	No	Rovin
"Like Ga, Na, Da" (가나다같이) †	AKMU	Non-album single	Yes	—N/a	Yes	—N/a	No	Rovin

=== 2016 ===
Song	Artist	Album	Lyrics		Music		Arrangement	
Song	Artist	Album	Credited	With	Credited	With	Credited	With
"Re-Bye" †	AKMU	Spring	Yes	—N/a	Yes	—N/a	No	Rovin
"How People Move" (사람들이 움직이는 게) †	AKMU	Spring	Yes	—N/a	Yes	—N/a	No	Rovin
"Haughty Girl" (새삼스럽게 왜)	AKMU	Spring	Yes	—N/a	Yes	—N/a	No	Denis Seo, Shin Seung-ik
"Green Window" (초록창가)	AKMU	Spring	Yes	—N/a	Yes	—N/a	No	Kang Wook-jin
"Every Little Thing" (사소한 것에서)	AKMU	Spring	Yes	—N/a	Yes	—N/a	No	Rovin
"Around" (주변인)	AKMU	Spring	Yes	—N/a	Yes	—N/a	No	Rovin
"Be With You" †	AKMU	Moon Lovers: Scarlet Heart Ryeo OST Part 12	Yes	Ji-hoon	Yes	ROCOBERRY	No	ROCOBERRY

=== 2017 ===
Song	Artist	Album	Lyrics		Music		Arrangement	
Song	Artist	Album	Credited	With	Credited	With	Credited	With
"Live" (생방송)	AKMU	Winter	Yes	—N/a	Yes	—N/a	No	minGtion
"Reality" (리얼리티) †	AKMU	Winter	Yes	—N/a	Yes	—N/a	No	Lee Hyun-young
"Last Goodbye" (오랜 날 오랜 밤) †	AKMU	Winter	Yes	—N/a	Yes	—N/a	No	Denis Seo, Shin Seung-ik
"Play Ugly" (못생긴척)	AKMU	Winter	Yes	—N/a	Yes	—N/a	No	Rovin
"Chocolady"	AKMU	Winter	Yes	—N/a	Yes	—N/a	No	Lee Hyun-young
"You Know Me"	AKMU	Winter	Yes	—N/a	Yes	—N/a	No	Rovin
"Way Back Home" (집에 돌아오는 길)	AKMU	Winter	Yes	—N/a	Yes	—N/a	No	Rovin
"Will Last Forever" (그때 그 아이들은)	AKMU	Winter	Yes	—N/a	Yes	—N/a	No	Philtre
"The Tree" (나무) †	Yang Hee-eun, AKMU	The Unexpected Meeting, Part 8	Yes	Ji-hoon	Yes	—N/a	No	Denis Seo, Shin Seung-ik
"Canaricano" (까나리카노) # ‡	Various Musicians (Defconn, Kim Jong-min, AKMU)	Non-album single	Yes	Lee Su-hyun, Defconn, Kim Jong-min	Yes	Lee Su-hyun	Yes	Lee Su-hyun
"Dinosaur" †	AKMU	Summer Episode	Yes	—N/a	Yes	Rovin	Yes	Rovin
"My Darling" †	AKMU	Summer Episode	Yes	—N/a	Yes	Rovin	Yes	Rovin
"Red Carpet"	Kim Hee-jung, Hwang Seung-eon, Lee Su-hyun, Kwon Hyun-bin, Deukie	Temporary Idols OST	Yes	Kim Hee-jeong, Deukie	Yes	Choice37	No	Choice37

=== 2019 ===
Song	Artist	Album	Lyrics		Music		Arrangement	
Song	Artist	Album	Credited	With	Credited	With	Credited	With
"Marine Triumph Song" (해병승전가) ‡	Republic of Korea Marine Corps	Non-album single	Yes	—N/a	Yes	—N/a	No	—N/a
"Chantey" (생방송)	AKMU	Sailing	Yes	—N/a	Yes	—N/a	No	Jukjae
"Fish in the Water" (물 만난 물고기)	AKMU	Sailing	Yes	—N/a	Yes	—N/a	No	Choi Ye-geun
"How Can I Love the Heartbreak, You're the One I Love" (어떻게 이별까지 사랑하겠어, 널 사랑하는 거지) †	AKMU	Sailing	Yes	—N/a	Yes	—N/a	No	Lee Hyun-young
"Moon" (달)	AKMU	Sailing	Yes	—N/a	Yes	—N/a	No	Jukjae
"Freedom"	AKMU	Sailing	Yes	—N/a	Yes	—N/a	No	Lee Hyun-young
"Should've Loved You More" (더 사랑해줄걸)	AKMU	Sailing	Yes	—N/a	Yes	—N/a	No	Choi Ye-geun
"Whale" (고래)	AKMU	Sailing	Yes	—N/a	Yes	—N/a	No	Jukjae
"Endless Dream, Good Night" (밤 끝없는 밤)	AKMU	Sailing	Yes	—N/a	Yes	—N/a	No	Denis Seo, Shin Seung-ik
"Farewell" (작별 인사)	AKMU	Sailing	Yes	—N/a	Yes	—N/a	No	Lee Su-hyun
"Let's Take Time" (시간을 갖자)	AKMU	Sailing	Yes	—N/a	Yes	—N/a	No	Hong So-jin
"Drift" #	AKMU	Non-album single	Yes	—N/a	Yes	Peejay	No	Peejay

=== 2020 ===
Song	Artist	Album	Lyrics		Music		Arrangement	
Song	Artist	Album	Credited	With	Credited	With	Credited	With
"Wayo" (왜요) †	Bang Ye-dam	Non-album single	Yes	Kang Seung-yoon, Future Bounce	No	Kang Seung-yoon, Future Bounce, Andrew Choi	No	Future Bounce
"World Love" #	AKMU	Non-album single	Yes	—N/a	Yes	Dwilly	No	—N/a
"Fish in the Water" (물 만난 물고기)	AKMU	AKMU [Sailing] Tour Live	Yes	—N/a	Yes	—N/a	No	Choi Ye-geun, Lee Hyun-young
"Reality and Crescendo (MEDLY VER)" (리얼리티 and Crescendo (MEDLEY VER))	AKMU	AKMU [Sailing] Tour Live	Yes	—N/a	Yes	—N/a	No	Rovin, Lee Hyun-young
"RE-BYE and Don't Cross Your Legs and Every Little Thing (MEDLY VER)" (RE BYE and 다리꼬지마 and 사소한것에서(MEDLEY VER))	AKMU	AKMU [Sailing] Tour Live	Yes	—N/a	Yes	—N/a	Yes	Rovin, Lee Hyun-young
"Melted" (RE BYE and 다리꼬지마 and 사소한것에서(MEDLEY VER))	AKMU	AKMU [Sailing] Tour Live	Yes	—N/a	Yes	—N/a	Yes	Koo Bon-am, Rovin
"Love Loss" (사랑상실증)	AKMU	AKMU [Sailing] Tour Live	Yes	—N/a	Yes	—N/a	Yes	—N/a
"Dinosaur"	AKMU	AKMU [Sailing] Tour Live	Yes	—N/a	Yes	Rovin	No	Choi Ye-geun, Lee Hyun-young
"How People Move" (사람들이움직이는게)	AKMU	AKMU [Sailing] Tour Live	Yes	—N/a	Yes	—N/a	No	Koo Bon-am, Rovin
"Give Love"	AKMU	AKMU [Sailing] Tour Live	Yes	—N/a	Yes	—N/a	No	Denis Seo, Shin Seung-ik, Lee Hyun-young
"200%"	AKMU	AKMU [Sailing] Tour Live	Yes	—N/a	Yes	—N/a	Yes	Rovin, Lee Hyun-young
"Last Goodbye" (오랜 날 오랜 밤)	AKMU	AKMU [Sailing] Tour Live	Yes	—N/a	Yes	—N/a	No	Denis Seo, Koo Bon-am, Shin Seung-ik
"Alien" †	Lee Su-hyun	Non-album single	Yes	—N/a	Yes	Seo Dong-hwan, Peejay	No	Peejay
"Happening" †	AKMU	Non-album single	Yes	—N/a	Yes	Millennium, Sihwang	No	Millennium, Sihwang

=== 2021 ===
Song	Artist	Album	Lyrics		Music		Arrangement	
Song	Artist	Album	Credited	With	Credited	With	Credited	With
"Slowmotion"	Treasure	The First Step: Treasure Effect	Yes	Choi Hyun-suk, Haruto	Yes	Millennium, Kim Chang-hoon	No	Millennium, Kim Chang-hoon
"We Were" (우린) †	Lee Seung-chul	Non-album single	Yes	—N/a	Yes	—N/a	No	Lee Hyun-young
"Ah Puh" (어푸)	IU	Lilac	Yes	IU	Yes	Peejay	No	Peejay
"Hey Kid, Close Your Eyes" (전쟁터)	AKMU, Lee Sun-hee	Next Episode	Yes	—N/a	Yes	Millennium, Sihwang	No	Millennium, Sihwang
"Nakka" (낙하) †	AKMU, IU	Next Episode	Yes	—N/a	Yes	Millennium	No	Millennium
"Bench"	AKMU, Zion.T	Next Episode	Yes	—N/a	Yes	Millennium, Lee Hyun-young	No	Millennium, Lee Hyun-young
"Tictoc Tictoc Tictoc" (째깍 째깍 째깍)	AKMU, Beenzino	Next Episode	Yes	Beenzino	Yes	Peejay, Beenzino	No	Peejay
"Next Episode" (맞짱)	AKMU, Choi Jung-hoon	Next Episode	Yes	—N/a	Yes	Lee Hyun-young	No	Lee Hyun-young
"Stupid Love Song"	AKMU, Crush	Next Episode	Yes	—N/a	Yes	Jukjae	No	Jukjae
"Everest"	AKMU, Sam Kim	Next Episode	Yes	—N/a	Yes	Jukjae	No	Jukjae
"Dissonance" (불협화음)	Mudd the Student, AKMU	Show Me the Money 10 Semi Final	Yes	Mudd the Student	Yes	Gray, Mudd the Student	No	Gray
"Cheers" (치열) † #	Code Kunst, Lee Chan-hyuk, Colde, Sogumm	RECONNECT	Yes	Colde, Sogumm	Yes	Code Kunst, Colde, Sogumm	No	Code Kunst
"We Are All Adventurers" #	AKMU	Non-album single	Yes	—N/a	Yes	—N/a	No	Lee Hyun-young

=== 2022 ===
Song	Artist	Album	Lyrics		Music		Arrangement	
Song	Artist	Album	Credited	With	Credited	With	Credited	With
"Chupa Chups" #	Lee Chan-hyuk	Non-album single	Yes	—N/a	Yes	Millennium, Sihwang	No	Millennium, Sihwang
"Let's Go Ride" #	AKMU	Non-album single	Yes	—N/a	Yes	Millennium, Sihwang	No	Millennium, Sihwang
"Free Smile" †	Lee Hyori, Lee Chan-hyuk	Seoul Check-In OST Part 10	Yes	—N/a	Yes	Millennium, Sihwang	No	—N/a
"I Love U" †	Winner	Holiday	Yes	Mino, Kang Seung-yoon, Kid Wine, Bang Ye-dam, AiRPLAY	Yes	Brian U, Kang Seung-yoon, Bang Ye-dam, Dee.P, AFTRSHOK, Rajan Muse, Noerio	No	Dee.P, AFTRSHOK, Rajan Muse
"Gulliver"	Kang Seung-yoon	Street Man Fighter (SMF) ORIGINAL VOL.2(OST)	Yes	—N/a	No	Czaer, Riskypizza, Dee.P	No	Czaer, Riskypizza, Dee.P
"Eyewitness Account" (목격담)	Lee Chan-hyuk	Error	Yes	—N/a	Yes	Millennium, Sihwang	No	—N/a
"Siren"	Lee Chan-hyuk	Error	Yes	—N/a	Yes	Millennium, Sihwang	No	—N/a
"Panorama" (파노라마) †	Lee Chan-hyuk	Error	Yes	—N/a	Yes	Millennium, Sihwang	No	—N/a
"Time! Stop!"	Lee Chan-hyuk	Error	Yes	—N/a	Yes	Millennium, Sihwang	No	—N/a
"If I Can't Go See You Right Now" (당장 널 만나러 가지 않으면)	Lee Chan-hyuk	Error	Yes	—N/a	Yes	Millennium, Sihwang	No	—N/a
"Goodbye, Stay Well" (마지막 인사)	Lee Chan-hyuk, Chungha	Error	Yes	—N/a	Yes	Millennium, Sihwang	No	—N/a
"What The" (뭐가)	Lee Chan-hyuk	Error	Yes	—N/a	Yes	Millennium, Sihwang	No	—N/a
"Missed Call" (부재중 전화)	Lee Chan-hyuk	Error	Yes	—N/a	Yes	Millennium, Sihwang	No	—N/a
"Castle in My Dream" (내 꿈의 성)	Lee Chan-hyuk	Error	Yes	—N/a	Yes	Millennium, Sihwang	No	—N/a
"A Day"	Lee Chan-hyuk	Error	Yes	—N/a	Yes	Millennium, Sihwang	No	—N/a
"Funeral Hope" (장례희망)	Lee Chan-hyuk	Error	Yes	—N/a	Yes	Millennium, Sihwang	No	—N/a
"We Were" (우린) †	Jung Ji-so, Hareem	Curtain Call OST Part.10	Yes	—N/a	Yes	—N/a	No	Hanbam (MIDNIGHT), Kim Se-jin

=== 2023 ===
Song	Artist	Album	Lyrics		Music		Arrangement	
Song	Artist	Album	Credited	With	Credited	With	Credited	With
"Heartbreak Club" (이별클럽) †	Colde, Lee Chan-hyuk	Love Part 2	Yes	Colde	Yes	Colde, Moon Jun-ho, Chae Wook-jin	No	Colde, Moon Jun-ho, Chae Wook-jin
"Migration" (이사)	Shin Bong-sun	Umbrella (우산)	No	Park Chang-hak	No	Yoon Sang	Yes	Lee Hyun-young
"Way to the Airport" (공항가는길)	Lee Se-young	Umbrella (우산)	No	Han Jin-young	No	Jung Soon-yong	Yes	Lee Hyun-young
"Dance" (공항가는길) †	Shin Se-hwi	Umbrella (우산)	No	Yoon Duk-won	No	Yoon Duk-won	Yes	—N/a
"The Moment You Want to Stay" (머물고싶은순간)	Go Ah-sung	Umbrella (우산)	No	Jo Jun-hyeong	No	Jo Jun-hyeong	Yes	—N/a
"Romantico"	Hanroro	Umbrella (우산)	No	Im Tae-hyuk	No	Im Tae-hyuk	Yes	—N/a
"Your Love" (너의사랑) †	Chanju, Lee Chan-hyuk	Wonderland	Yes	Chanju	Yes	Chanju, Yun Seok-cheol	No	Yun Seok-cheol
"Your Love" (너의사랑) (ORIGINAL VER.)	Chanju	Wonderland	Yes	Chanju	Yes	ROCKITMAN, Chanju	No	ROCKITMAN, Chanju
"Bona Bona" †	Treasure	Reboot	Yes	Junkyu, Choi Hyun-suk, Yoshi, Haruto, Where the Noise, Jared Lee, Dan Whittemore	No	Diggy, Where the Noise, Dee.P, Kang Uk-jin, Dan Whittemore, Jared Lee	No	Yang Hyun-suk, Dee.P
"Wonderland"	Treasure	Reboot	Yes	Choi Hyun-suk, Yoshi, Haruto, Junkyu	Yes	Kim Seung-ho, Kwon Myung-hwan, Dee.P, Junkyu	No	Dee.P, Kim Seung-ho, Kwon Myung-hwan
"Love Lee" †	AKMU	Love Lee	Yes	—N/a	Yes	Millennium, Sihwang	No	—N/a
"Fry's Dream" (후라이의꿈)	AKMU	Love Lee	Yes	—N/a	Yes	Rovin	No	—N/a
"Batter Up" †	BabyMonster	Non-album single	Yes	Jared Lee, Yang Hyun-suk, Asa, Choi Hyun-suk, Where the Noise, Bigtone	No	Chaz Mishan, Yang Hyun-suk, Dee.P, Jared Lee, Asa	No	Yang Hyun-suk, Dee.P, Chaz Mishan
"V (Peace)" †	Zion.T, AKMU	Zip	Yes	Zion.T, Kim San	No	Zion.T, Slom, Park Jun-woo, Kim San, Koo Young-jun, Peejay	No	Slom, Park Jun-woo, Koo Young-jun, Peejay
"Eat Sleep Live Repeat" (잘먹고잘살아) †	Lee Sung-kyung, Lee Chan-hyuk	Non-album single	Yes	Peter Han, Kim Yun-su, Kim Jong-gil, DEEKEI	Yes	Peter Han, Kim Yun-su, Kim Jong-gil, DEEKEI	No	Peter Han, Kim Yun-su, Kim Jong-gil, Park Aaron

=== 2024 ===
Song	Artist	Album	Lyrics		Music		Arrangement	
Song	Artist	Album	Credited	With	Credited	With	Credited	With
"1 Trillion" (1조) †	Lee Chan-hyuk	Non-album single	Yes	—N/a	Yes	Millennium, Sihwang	No	—N/a
"Chill-hage" (Chill하게 (청량바이브)) #	AKMU	Non-album single	Yes	—N/a	Yes	Millennium	No	—N/a
"Hero" †	AKMU	LOVE EPISODE	Yes	—N/a	Yes	—N/a	No	Lee Hyun-young, Park Jae-beom
"Long D" (롱디)	AKMU	LOVE EPISODE	Yes	—N/a	Yes	dress	No	—N/a
"Peace of Cake" (케익의 평화)	AKMU	LOVE EPISODE	Yes	—N/a	Yes	WOOGIE	No	—N/a
"Answer Me" (답답해)	AKMU	LOVE EPISODE	Yes	—N/a	Yes	moocean	No	—N/a
"HalliGalli"	Nayeon	Na	Yes	—N/a	Yes	LP	No	LP
"Million Stars" #	AKMU	Non-album single	Yes	—N/a	Yes	Millennium	No	—N/a
"TRICK CODE" #	Lee Chan-hyuk	Non-album single	No	—N/a	Yes	Millennium, Sihwang	No	—N/a
"Complicated"	BABO	b	Yes	—N/a	Yes	Shin Hyun-bin, Jung Dae-il	No	—N/a
"Cheek" (뺨) †	BABO	b	Yes	—N/a	Yes	Shin Hyun-bin, Jung Dae-il	No	—N/a
"bbbb" (별별별별)	BABO	b	Yes	—N/a	Yes	Shin Hyun-bin, Jung Dae-il	No	—N/a
"Collapse" (멸망)	BABO	b	Yes	—N/a	Yes	Shin Hyun-bin, Jung Dae-il	No	—N/a
"Danso"	BABO	b	Yes	—N/a	Yes	Shin Hyun-bin, Jung Dae-il	No	—N/a
"Howl of the Wolves" (늑대를 찾아서)	BABO	b	Yes	—N/a	Yes	Shin Hyun-bin, Jung Dae-il	No	—N/a
"Thanks, liar"	BABO	b	Yes	—N/a	Yes	Shin Hyun-bin, Jung Dae-il	No	—N/a
"blues"	BABO	b	No	—N/a	Yes	Shin Hyun-bin, Jung Dae-il	No	—N/a

=== 2025 ===
Song	Artist	Album	Lyrics		Music		Arrangement	
Song	Artist	Album	Credited	With	Credited	With	Credited	With
"DADA" † #	AKMU	Non-album single	Yes	—N/a	Yes	Millennium, Sihwang	Yes	Millennium, Sihwang
"Yellow Day"	Jung Ji-so	Midnight Sun OST	Yes	—N/a	Yes	John Ofa Rhee, Cryinstereo	No	—N/a
"Every Time I Do This, I Imagine" (이럴 때마다 상상해)	Jung Ji-so	Midnight Sun OST	Yes	—N/a	Yes	—N/a	No	Lee Hyun-young
"Love" (사랑을)	Jung Ji-so, Cha Hak-yeon	Midnight Sun OST	Yes	—N/a	Yes	John Ofa Rhee, Cryinstereo	No	—N/a
"Sculpture Stars" (조각별) †	Jung Ji-so	Midnight Sun OST	Yes	—N/a	Yes	Seo Dong-hwan	No	—N/a
"MUSIC" †	Big Naughty, Lee Chan-hyuk	Non-album single	Yes	Big Naughty	Yes	Big Naughty, HAH, Flexindoor, Jeon Sung-bae, Choi Bo-seung	No	HAH, Flexindoor, Jeon Sung-bae, Big Naughty
"SINNY SINNY"	Lee Chan-hyuk	Eros	Yes	—N/a	Yes	Millennium, Sihwang	No	—N/a
"Out of My Mind" (돌아버렸어)	Lee Chan-hyuk	Eros	Yes	—N/a	Yes	Millennium, Sihwang	No	—N/a
"Vivid LaLa Love" (비비드라라러브)	Lee Chan-hyuk	Eros	Yes	—N/a	Yes	Millennium, Sihwang	No	—N/a
"TV Show"	Lee Chan-hyuk	Eros	Yes	—N/a	Yes	Millennium, Sihwang	No	—N/a
"Endangered Love" (멸종위기사랑)	Lee Chan-hyuk	Eros	Yes	—N/a	Yes	Millennium, Sihwang, Lee Jin-hyub	No	—N/a
"Eve"	Lee Chan-hyuk	Eros	Yes	—N/a	Yes	Millennium, Sihwang	No	—N/a
"Andrew"	Lee Chan-hyuk	Eros	Yes	—N/a	Yes	Millennium, Sihwang	No	—N/a
"TAIL" (꼬리)	Lee Chan-hyuk	Eros	Yes	—N/a	Yes	Millennium, Shin Hyun-bin, Jung Dae-il	No	—N/a
"Shining Ground" (빛나는 세상)	Lee Chan-hyuk	Eros	Yes	—N/a	Yes	Millennium, Lee Jin-hyub	No	—N/a
"LOVE ME PRIVATE"	BABO	Non-album single	Yes	—N/a	Yes	Shin Hyun-bin, Jung Dae-il	No	—N/a
"Cafe Latte"	Lilas Ikuta	Laugh	No	—N/a	Yes	Seo Dong-hwan	Yes	INFX, Seo Dong-hwan
"WE WISH"	Lee Chan-hyuk	Non-album single	Yes	—N/a	No	—N/a	No	—N/a

=== 2026 ===
Song	Artist	Album	Lyrics		Music		Arrangement	
Song	Artist	Album	Credited	With	Credited	With	Credited	With
"Paradise of Rumors" (소문의 낙원)	AKMU	Flowering	Yes	—N/a	Yes	—N/a	Yes	Lee Jin-hyub
"Spring Colors" (봄 색깔)	AKMU	Flowering	Yes	—N/a	Yes	—N/a	Yes	Lee Jin-hyub
"Paid With Bugs" (벌레를 내고)	AKMU	Flowering	Yes	—N/a	Yes	—N/a	Yes	Lee Jin-hyub
"Joy, Sorrow, A Beautiful Heart" (기쁨, 슬픔, 아름다운 마음)	AKMU	Flowering	Yes	—N/a	Yes	—N/a	Yes	Lee Jin-hyub
"Sunshine Bless You" (햇빛 bless you)	AKMU	Flowering	Yes	—N/a	Yes	—N/a	Yes	Lee Jin-hyub
"Tent"	AKMU	Flowering	Yes	—N/a	Yes	—N/a	Yes	Lee Jin-hyub
"Young and Married" (어린 부부)	AKMU	Flowering	Yes	—N/a	Yes	—N/a	Yes	Lee Jin-hyub
"The Right Person" (옳은 사람)	AKMU	Flowering	Yes	—N/a	Yes	—N/a	Yes	Lee Jin-hyub
"Graceful Breakfast" (우아한 아침 식사)	AKMU	Flowering	Yes	—N/a	Yes	—N/a	Yes	Lee Jin-hyub
"Festival of Refugees" (난민들의 축제)	AKMU	Flowering	Yes	—N/a	Yes	—N/a	Yes	—N/a
"Stains" (얼룩)	AKMU	Flowering	Yes	—N/a	Yes	—N/a	Yes	Lee Jin-hyub
"Sexy Dance"	BABO	B AB O	Yes	—N/a	Yes	Kim Chan-ho, Shin Hyun-bin, Jung Dae-il	Yes	Shin Hyun-bin, Jung Dae-il
"Baboo"	BABO	B AB O	Yes	—N/a	Yes	Kim Chan-ho, Shin Hyun-bin, Jung Dae-il	Yes	Shin Hyun-bin, Jung Dae-il
"Thriller" (뜨릴러)	BABO	B AB O	Yes	—N/a	Yes	Shin Hyun-bin, Jung Dae-il	Yes	Shin Hyun-bin, Jung Dae-il
"Wah" †	BABO	B AB O	Yes	—N/a	Yes	Kim Chan-ho, Shin Hyun-bin, Jung Dae-il	Yes	Shin Hyun-bin, Jung Dae-il
"Beautiful Mannequin" †	BABO	B AB O	Yes	—N/a	Yes	Choi Rae-sung, Shin Hyun-bin, Jung Dae-il	Yes	Shin Hyun-bin, Jung Dae-il
"Born King" (고귀한 탄생)	BABO	B AB O	Yes	—N/a	Yes	Choi Rae-sung, Kim Chan-ho, Shin Hyun-bin, Jung Dae-il	Yes	Shin Hyun-bin, Jung Dae-il
"B-day Party"	BABO	B AB O	Yes	—N/a	Yes	Shin Hyun-bin, Jung Dae-il, Won Seo-jung	Yes	Shin Hyun-bin, Jung Dae-il

== Unreleased songs ==
=== Copyright registered songs ===
Song	Artist	Year	Lyrics		Music		Arrangement		Details
Song	Artist	Year	Credited	With	Credited	With	Credited	With	Details
"Fry's Dream" (후라이의꿈)	IU, AKMU	2014	Yes	—N/a	Yes	Jeon Jeong-hwan	No	Jeon Jeong-hwan	Initially given to IU as a gift and expected to be released under her name, the song was performed by IU and Chan-hyuk for the first time at the November 22, 2014 AKMU Camp concert. Due to a misunderstanding from both parties, this song was never officially released under IU's name until 2021, when the ownership of the song was returned to AKMU. "Fry's Dream" was eventually released by AKMU in 2023.
"HUB LOVE"	AKMU	2014	Yes	—N/a	Yes	—N/a	No	Rovin	Commercial song for Samsung's Chef Collection - Family Hub. The song was only publicly showcased at the AKMU Diary concerts (2017).
"Short Hair" (단발머리)	AKMU	2017	No	Park Geon-ho	No	Cho Yong-pil	Yes	Denis Seo, Shin Seung-ik	Promotional song for the movie A Taxi Driver, was not included in the official soundtrack. The full version of the song was performed by Lee Su-hyun at the 2017 Pentaport Rock Festival.

=== Unregistered songs ===
Song	Artist	Year	Lyrics		Music		Arrangement		Details
Song	Artist	Year	Credited	With	Credited	With	Credited	With	Details
"ugly" (못나니)	AKMU	2013	Yes	—N/a	Yes	—N/a	No	—N/a	Performed at K-Pop Star 2.
"Optical Illusion" (착시현상)	AKMU	2013	Yes	—N/a	Yes	—N/a	No	—N/a	Performed at K-Pop Star 2.
"I Don't Dance" (춤은 안춰요)	AKMU	2025	Yes	—N/a	Yes	—N/a	No	—N/a	First performed at AKMU's 2025 Standing Concert AKDONGDEUL.
