= List of awards and nominations received by AKMU =

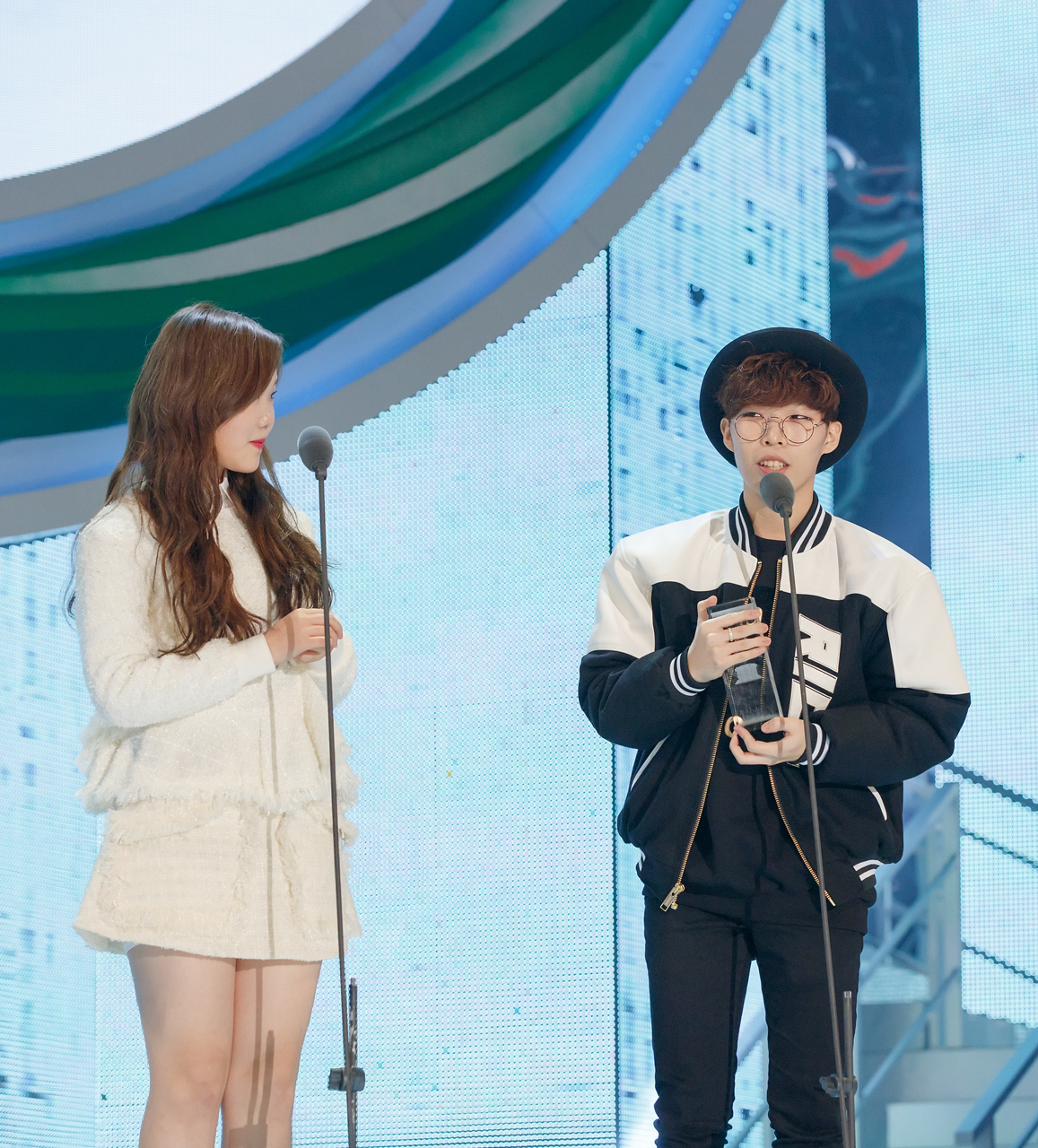
- AKMU at the 2014 Melon Music Awards
Awards and nominations
Award	Wins	Nominations
Asia Artist Awards	1	1
Gaon Chart Music Awards	3	9
Golden Disc Awards	3	12
Korean Music Awards	4	12
Korea First Brand Awards	2	2
Melon Music Awards	4	19
Mnet Asian Music Awards	2	12
Seoul Music Awards	0	10
World Music Awards	0	6
Other awards	7	9

Totals (Note: Certain award groups do not simply award one winner. They acknowledge several different recipients, have runners-up, and have third place. Since this is a specific recognition and is different from losing an award, runner-up mentions are considered wins in this award tally. For simplification and to avoid errors, each award in this list has been presumed to have had a prior nomination.)
- Wins: 27
- Nominations: 97

This is a list of awards and nominations received by AKMU, a South Korean duo who participated on K-pop Star 2 in 2012 and debuted under YG Entertainment in 2014 after they won the second installment of the K-pop Star series.

== Awards and nominations ==
Name of the award ceremony, year presented, category, nominee(s) of the award, and the result of the nomination
Award ceremony	Year	Category	Nominee / work	Result	Ref.
Asia Artist Awards	2023	Best Artist Award (Singer)	AKMU	Won	
Brand Customer Loyalty Awards	2020	Singer-songwriter Award	AKMU	Won	
Bugs Awards	2014	Album of The Year	Play	Nominated	
Bugs Awards	2014	Top 10 Album	Play	Won	
Bugs Awards	2014	Song of The Year	"200%"	Nominated	
Bugs Awards	2014	Top 10 Song	"200%"	Won	
Bugs Awards	2014	Rookie of The Year	AKMU	Won	
Cyworld Digital Music Awards	2012	Rookie Of The Month – December	"You are Attractive" (매력있어)	Won	
Gaon Chart Music Awards	2015	New Artist of the Year	AKMU	Nominated	
Gaon Chart Music Awards	2015	Song of the Year (April)	"200%"	Won	
Gaon Chart Music Awards	2017	Song of the Year (May)	"Re-Bye"	Nominated	
Gaon Chart Music Awards	2017	Song of the Year (May)	"How People Move"	Nominated	
Gaon Chart Music Awards	2018	Song of the Year (January)	"Last Goodbye"	Won	
Gaon Chart Music Awards	2018	Song of the Year (July)	"Dinosaur"	Nominated	
Gaon Chart Music Awards	2020	Artist of the Year - Digital Music (September)	"How Can I Love the Heartbreak, You're the One I Love"	Won	
Gaon Chart Music Awards	2022	Song of the Year (July)	"Nakka" (with IU)	Nominated	
Gaon Chart Music Awards	2022	Song of the Year (July)	"Hey Kid, Close Your Eyes" (with Lee Sun-hee)	Nominated	
Gaon Chart Music Awards	2024	Streaming Unique Listeners	"Love Lee"	Nominated	
Gaon Chart Music Awards	2024	V Coloring of the Year	"Love Lee"	Won	
Gaon Chart Music Awards	2024	Busan is Good Award	AKMU	Won	
Golden Disc Awards	2015	Disk Bonsang	Play	Nominated	
Golden Disc Awards	2015	Digital Bonsang	"200%"	Nominated	
Golden Disc Awards	2015	New Artist of the Year	AKMU	Nominated	
Golden Disc Awards	2015	Popularity Award	AKMU	Nominated	
Golden Disc Awards	2017	Digital Bonsang	"Re-Bye"	Nominated	
Golden Disc Awards	2017	Popularity Award	AKMU	Nominated	
Golden Disc Awards	2017	Asian Choice Popularity Award	AKMU	Nominated	
Golden Disc Awards	2018	Digital Bonsang	"Last Goodbye"	Won	
Golden Disc Awards	2018	Digital Daesang	"Last Goodbye"	Nominated	
Golden Disc Awards	2018	Global Popularity Award	AKMU	Nominated	
Golden Disc Awards	2020	Digital Bonsang	"How Can I Love the Heartbreak, You're the One I Love"	Won	
Golden Disc Awards	2022	Digital Bonsang	"Nakka"	Won	
Hanteo Music Awards	2023	Artist of the Year (Bonsang)	AKMU	Nominated	
KBS Entertainment Awards	2023	Rookie Award in Show and Variety Category	AKMU	Nominated	
Korean Advertising Congress	2015	Grand Prize for Advertisement Model	AKMU	Won	
Korean First Brand Awards	2020	Singer-Songwriter Category	AKMU	Won	
Korean First Brand Awards	2024	Singer-Songwriter Category	AKMU	Won	
Korean Music Awards	2015	Rookie of the Year	AKMU	Nominated	
Korean Music Awards	2015	Best Pop Album	Play	Won	
Korean Music Awards	2015	Best Pop Song	"Melted"	Nominated	
Korean Music Awards	2015	Netizens' Choice: Artist of the Year	AKMU	Nominated	
Korean Music Awards	2020	Song of the Year	"How Can I Love the Heartbreak, You're the One I Love"	Nominated	
Korean Music Awards	2020	Best Pop Song	"How Can I Love the Heartbreak, You're the One I Love"	Nominated	
Korean Music Awards	2020	Best Pop Album	Sailing	Nominated	
Korean Music Awards	2022	Album of the Year	Next Episode	Nominated	
Korean Music Awards	2022	Best Pop Album	Next Episode	Nominated	
Korean Music Awards	2022	Song of the Year	"Nakka"	Nominated	
Korean Music Awards	2022	Best Pop Song	"Nakka"	Won	
Korean Music Awards	2024	Best Pop Song	"Love Lee"	Won	
Melon Music Awards	2013	Song of the Year	"Crescendo"	Nominated	
Melon Music Awards	2013	Best OST Award	"I Love You"	Nominated	
Melon Music Awards	2014	Top 10 Artists	AKMU	Won	
Melon Music Awards	2014	Artist of the Year	AKMU	Nominated	
Melon Music Awards	2014	Album of the Year	Play	Nominated	
Melon Music Awards	2014	Song of the Year	"200%"	Nominated	
Melon Music Awards	2014	Best Folk/Blues Song	"200%"	Won	
Melon Music Awards	2016	Album of the Year	Spring	Nominated	
Melon Music Awards	2016	Artist of the Year	AKMU	Nominated	
Melon Music Awards	2016	Top 10 Artists	AKMU	Won	
Melon Music Awards	2016	Best Folk/Blues Song	"Re-Bye"	Nominated	
Melon Music Awards	2017	Album of the Year	Winter	Nominated	
Melon Music Awards	2017	Song of the Year	"Last Goodbye"	Nominated	
Melon Music Awards	2017	Best Folk/Blues Song	"Last Goodbye"	Nominated	
Melon Music Awards	2019	Top 10 Artists	AKMU	Nominated	
Melon Music Awards	2019	Album of the Year	Sailing	Nominated	
Melon Music Awards	2019	Best Rock	"Freedom"	Nominated	
Melon Music Awards	2021	Top 10 Artists	AKMU	Won	
Melon Music Awards	2021	Album of the Year	Next Episode	Nominated	
Mnet Asian Music Awards	2014	Best New Artist	AKMU	Nominated	
Mnet Asian Music Awards	2014	Artist of the Year	AKMU	Nominated	
Mnet Asian Music Awards	2019	Best Vocal Performance – Group	"How Can I Love the Heartbreak, You're the One I Love"	Nominated	
Mnet Asian Music Awards	2019	Song of the Year	"How Can I Love the Heartbreak, You're the One I Love"	Nominated	
Mnet Asian Music Awards	2019	Worldwide Fans' Choice Top 10	AKMU	Nominated	
Mnet Asian Music Awards	2021	Best Vocal Performance	"Nakka"	Nominated	
Mnet Asian Music Awards	2021	Song of the Year	"Nakka"	Nominated	
Mnet Asian Music Awards	2021	Best Collaboration	"Nakka"	Won	
Mnet Asian Music Awards	2021	Worldwide Fans’ Choice Top 10	AKMU	Nominated	
Mnet Asian Music Awards	2023	Best Vocal Performance – Group	"Love Lee"	Won	
Mnet Asian Music Awards	2023	Song of the Year	"Love Lee"	Longlisted	
Mnet Asian Music Awards	2023	Worldwide Fans’ Choice Top 10	AKMU	Nominated	
SBS Awards Festival	2014	Top 10 Artist	AKMU	Won	
Seoul Music Awards	2015	Bonsang Award	AKMU	Nominated	
Seoul Music Awards	2015	New Artist Award	AKMU	Nominated	
Seoul Music Awards	2015	Popularity Award	AKMU	Nominated	
Seoul Music Awards	2015	Hallyu Special Award	AKMU	Nominated	
Seoul Music Awards	2017	Bonsang Award	AKMU	Nominated	
Seoul Music Awards	2017	Popularity Award	AKMU	Nominated	
Seoul Music Awards	2017	Hallyu Special Award	AKMU	Nominated	
Seoul Music Awards	2018	Bonsang Award	AKMU	Nominated	
Seoul Music Awards	2018	Popularity Award	AKMU	Nominated	
Seoul Music Awards	2018	Hallyu Special Award	AKMU	Nominated	
World Music Awards	2014	World's Best Song	"200%"	Nominated	
World Music Awards	2014	World's Best Song	"Give Love"	Nominated	
World Music Awards	2014	World's Best Song	"Melted"	Nominated	
World Music Awards	2014	World's Best Group	AKMU	Nominated	
World Music Awards	2014	World's Best Live Act	AKMU	Nominated	
World Music Awards	2014	World's Best Video	"200%"	Nominated	

== Other accolades ==
=== Listicles ===
Name of publisher, year listed, name of listicle, and placement
Publisher	Year	List	Placement	Ref.
Billboard	2014	21 Under 21	19th	
