= 2000 Won =

South Korean musical duo

- Origin: South Korea
- Genres: K-pop
- Years active: 2013–present
- Label: Reve Entertainment (South Korea)
- Members: Kim Hyo-bin; Kim Il-do
- Website: 2000 Won on Facebook

- 2000 Won
- Hangul: 이천원
- RR: Icheonwon
- MR: Ich'ŏnwŏn

2000 Won (Korean: 이천원) is a South Korean male duo formed in 2013. The duo consists of friends Kim Hyo-Bin and Kim Il-Do who came to prominence on K-pop Star 2, finishing in the Top Four. From this success, the pair were signed by Reve Entertainment in July of the same year and in March 2014 made their debut.

== Debut ==
Relatively unknown, 2000 Won made their first TV appearance on the second series of Good Sunday's K-pop Star - covering Park Jin-young's Elevator; Sistar's 나혼자 (Alone); Sanulrim's 개구쟁이 (Naughty Boy); 2NE1's Lonely and Sim Soo-bong's Million Roses. After increased popularity, the band signed for Reve Entertainment. Subsequently, on March 11 of the next year, they announced their upcoming debut titled "Beautiful". The next day, the two released the teaser for the single and announced that fellow K-pop artist Ailee would be featuring. The single was then released March 14.

== Members ==
- Kim Hyo-bin (김효빈)
- Kim Il-do (김일도)

== Discography ==
=== Singles ===
Year	Title	Peak positions		Sales (Digital download)	Album
Year	Title	KOR Gaon	KOR Billboard	Sales (Digital download)	Album
2014	"Beautiful" (feat Ailee)	25	—	KOR:88,363+	Digital Single
2014	"I Hate Seoul"	43	—	KOR:66,410+	2000Won 1st Mini Album
2014	"—" denotes releases that did not chart or were not released in that region.				
2015	"Good Bam"				2nd single
2017	"Tears Attack"				3rd single
2018	"Ssul"				4th single
