= AKMU =

South Korean sibling duo

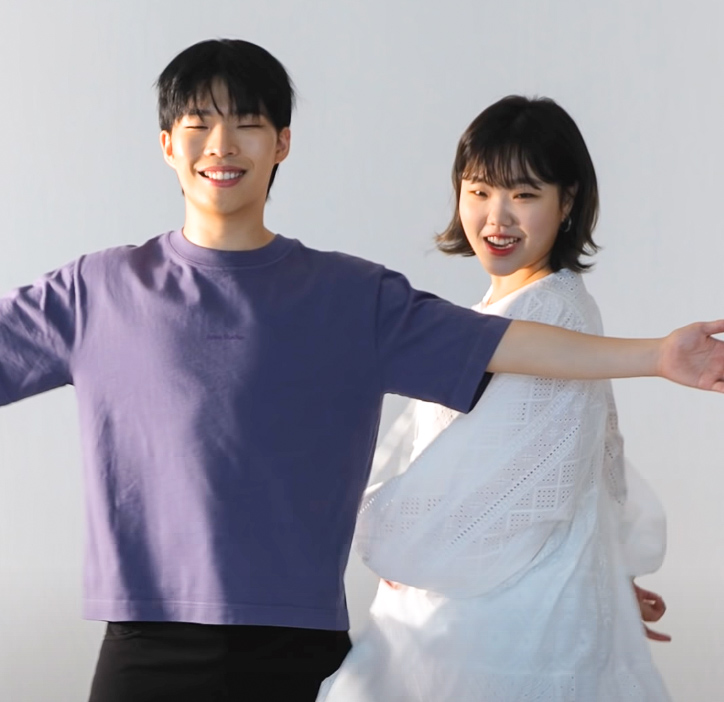
- L-R: Lee Chan-hyuk, Lee Su-hyun; AKMU in 2021

Background information
- Also known as: Akdong Musician
- Origin: Seoul, South Korea
- Genres: K-pop; soul; folk-pop
- Years active: 2012–present
- Labels: YG; Cemter of Inspiration
- Members: Lee Chan-hyuk; Lee Su-hyun

Korean name
- Hangul: 악뮤
- Hanja: 樂뮤
- RR: Angmyu
- MR: Angmyu

AKMU (/ɑːŋmjuː/; Korean: 악뮤), formerly Akdong Musician (/ɑːkdɒŋ mjuːˈzɪʃn/; Korean: 악동뮤지션), is a South Korean duo consisting of siblings Lee Chan-hyuk and Lee Su-hyun signed to their own independent label Center of Inspiration, translated from "Yeonggam-ui Saemteo" which is also the name of an exhibition previously held by Chan-hyuk in 2023 and 2025. As prominent figures of South Korea, their musical impact in their native country has earned them numerous accolades and the honorific title "The Nation's Siblings". They are also cited as "musical prodigies" and "geniuses".

Propelled to national stardom through the second installation of K-pop Star (2012–2013), AKMU officially debuted in April 2014 with Play, a studio album solely crafted by Lee Chan-hyuk alone. It topped the Gaon Album Chart, became their first entry on Billboard, namely the Heatseekers Albums Chart and the World Albums Chart, and spawned the three titular singles, "200%", "Give Love", and "Melted". It was well received by the public and critics, having sold more than 6.9 million downloads, and was awarded Best Pop Album in the 12th Korean Music Awards. Following the release of their critically acclaimed Puberty series, consisting of Spring (2016) and Winter (2017), the sibling duo reached greater career heights with Sailing (2019) and its lead single "How Can I Love the Heartbreak, You're the One I Love", which not only topped the Circle Digital Chart, but also sold 2.5 million digital copies, following "Last Goodbye" (2017), and was the fourth single to be certified triple platinum for streaming in Korea Music Content Association history.

== Career ==
=== Pre-debut: Early life and K-pop Star 2 ===
Lee Chan-hyuk (born September 12, 1996) and Lee Su-hyun (born May 4, 1999) lived with their missionary parents in Mongolia for five years before returning to South Korea to pursue a career in music. Living an impoverished life, they were home-schooled, unable to afford education; detesting the idea of studying, they turned to music out of sheer boredom, learning to play the guitar and piano, respectively. Lee Su-hyun, the younger sister, abruptly returned to Korea for a short stay to resolve visa problems; her brother soon followed, deciding to stay. The siblings, under the name Akdong Musician, joined Proteurment, an intercollegiate association that supports amateur artists, after they were discovered on YouTube, and performed on stages with an original song titled "Galaxy".

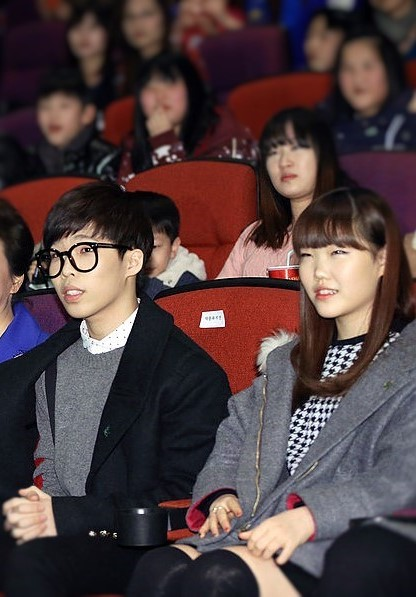
Akdong Musician attending KOCIS Korea President Park Culture Day with President Park Geun-hye

In August 2012, the duo participated in the preliminary auditions of K-pop Star 2 (2012–2013) at Jamsil Arena in Seoul. Eligible to perform in the first round, they sang a cover of Miss A's "Breathe" and an original song titled "Don't Cross Your Legs", an instant audience favorite. Amidst the panel of judges, Park Jin-young praised the chemistry between the siblings and the techniques they had incorporated in their performances; BoA praised the lyrics of their original song; Yang Hyun-suk described them as "true artists". Crowned as the winners of the competition, Akdong Musician received a cash prize of ₩300 million ($260,000), a Renault Samsung sedan, and the freedom to sign a contract with one of the three largest entertainment agencies in the country: S.M. Entertainment, YG Entertainment, or JYP Entertainment. Following almost two months of contemplation, the siblings signed an exclusive contract with YG Entertainment, believing it was the best place to support their music. Its founder, Yang Hyun-suk, cited the label would not change their unique image or their music style. The duo have since garnered a significant following, where songs performed on the show, namely "Don't Cross Your Legs," spawned to number two on the Gaon Digital Chart in December 2012. "You Are Attractive" topped the charts weeks after, beating the dominance of Christmas carols, and further compositions such as "A Foreigner's Confession", "Crescendo", and "It is Ramen", also displayed its reach. In the two months they were unafflicated, the duo filmed for commercials and released several singles, including "I Love You" for tvN drama All About My Romance (2013).

=== 2014–2018: Debut, Puberty series, and military enlistment ===
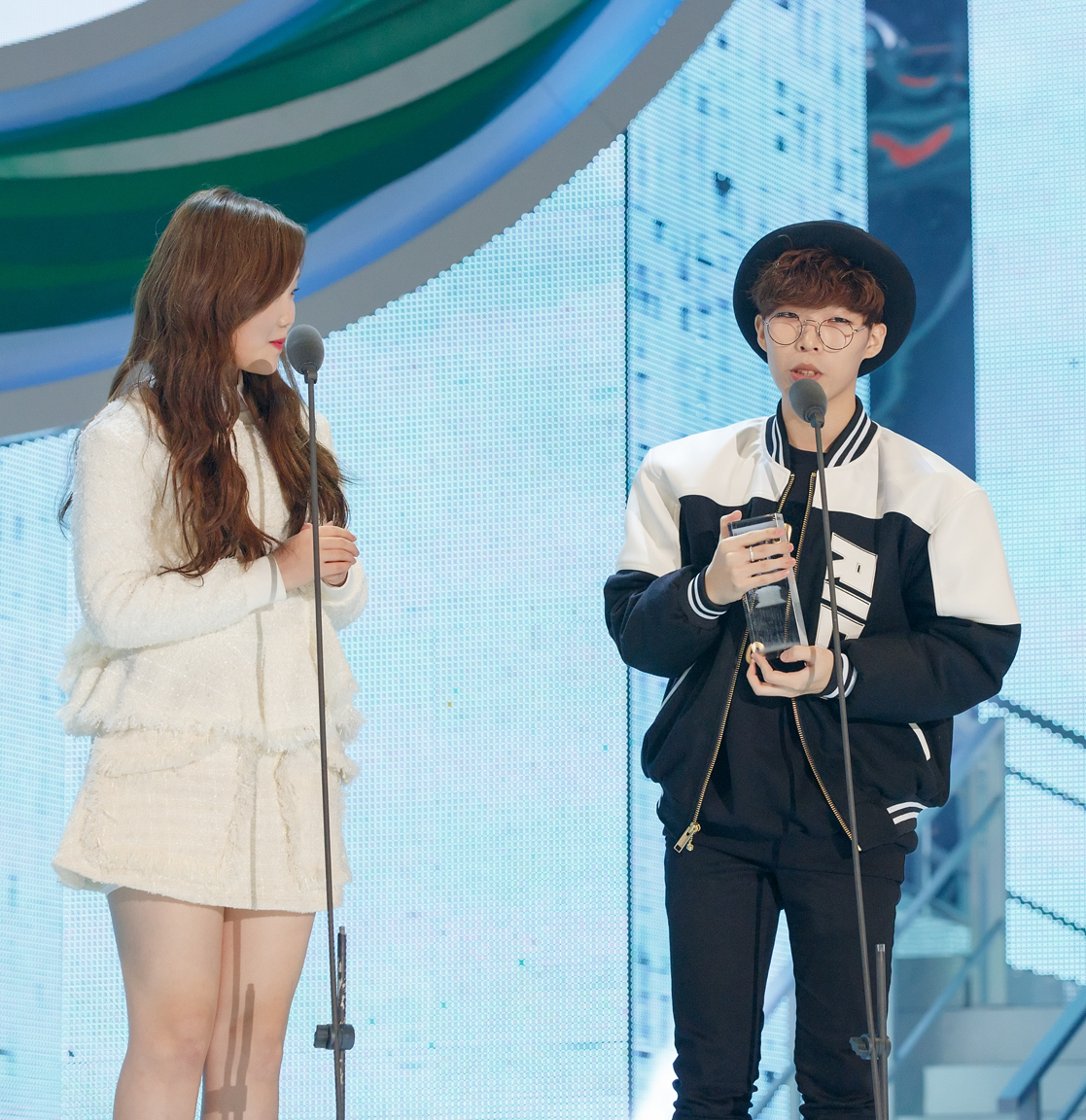
Akdong Musician at the Melon Music Awards 2014.

Akdong Musician debuted with the studio album Play on April 7, 2014, twelve months after winning K-pop Star 2 (2012–2013). It was promoted through three titular singles: "200%", selected by Yang Hyun-suk; "Melted", chosen by the duo; and the third, decided by the public through the reflected chart performance of the other songs. "Give Love" achieved the highest popularity, peaking at number four and three on the Gaon Digital Chart and the Billboard K-pop Hot 100, respectively, becoming the third single. "200%" charted atop the aforementioned charts for two weeks, while "Melted" peaked at number five and eight, respectively. Both lead singles appeared on the US World Digital Songs Chart at number 5 and 21, respectively, their first entries on the chart. Entirely written and produced by Lee Chan-hyuk, Play claimed number one on the Gaon Album Chart, number two on the US World Albums Chart, and number twenty on Billboard's Heatseekers Albums Chart, nearing a Billboard 200 entry, an uncommon achievement for a new K-pop act. Following the Sewol Ferry Incident, all of the sibling's activities were cancelled to share a state of mourning. The duo dedicated their single, "200%", to the victims of the sunken Sewol ferry and their families, and honored its victims by inserting an image of a yellow ribbon in the music video of "Give Love", released on May 2, 2014. Initially created for their debut album, the acoustic-ballad, "Time and Fallen Leaves" (시간과 낙엽), was held back for the autumn season. Released on October 10, the digital single peaked atop the Gaon Digital Chart in its second week of release, the latest addition of autumnal hits in the country; the single was not accompanied by a music video so the listeners would imagine their own stories. In November 2014, the duo embarked on a nationwide tour commenced in Seoul, titled "AKMU Camp".

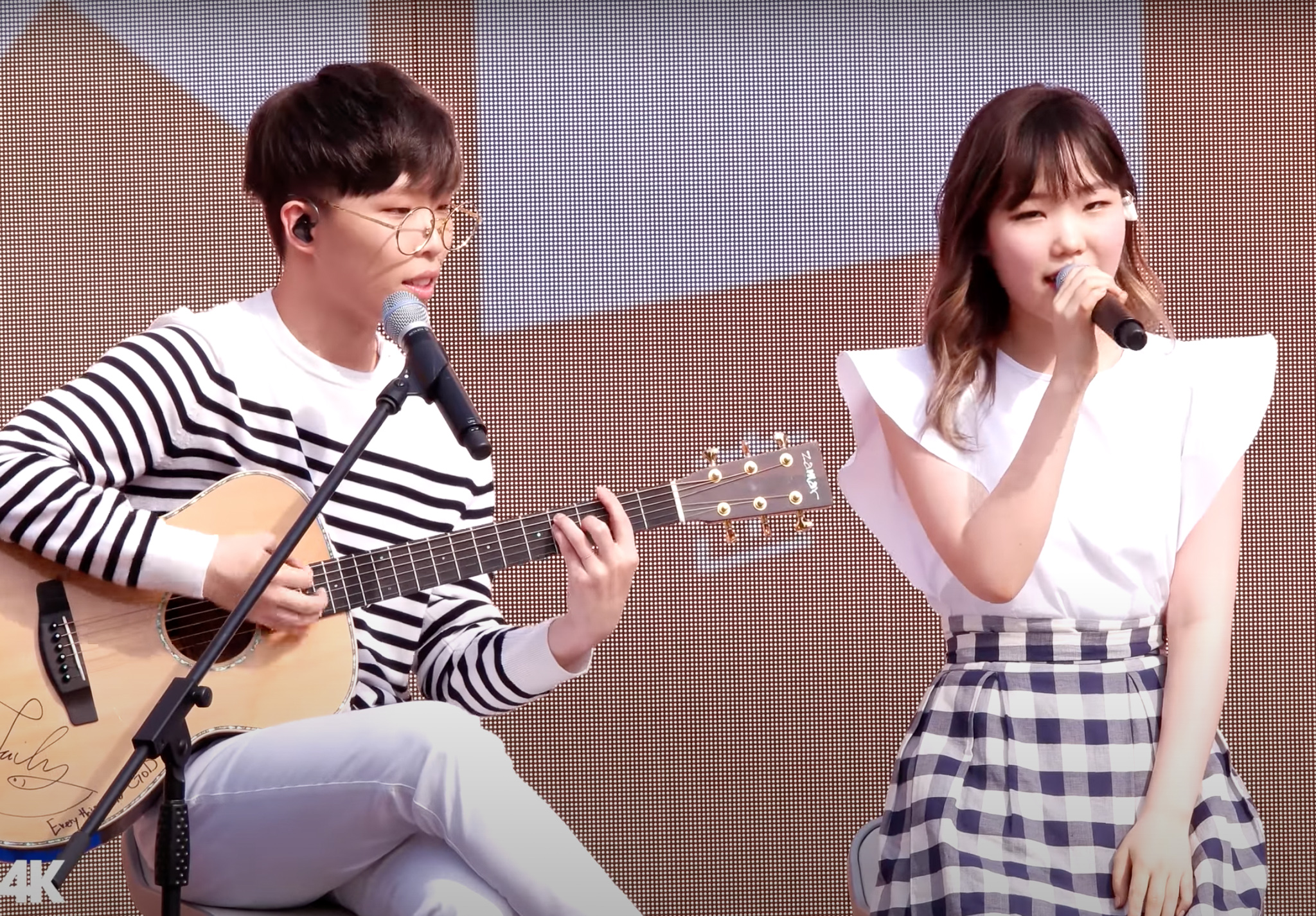
The sibling duo performing at Seoul Forest in May 2016.

Two years since their last album, Akdong Musician returned with their first EP titled Spring on May 4, 2016, the first record of the two-part series, Puberty. It was promoted with two lead singles: "Re-Bye" and "How People Move" (사람들이 움직이는 게), and represented the duo "growing up" through the themes of adolescence, where all six tracks are about their youth during their five-years in Mongolia. It caught the attention of domestic and international listeners alike; every song charted in the top ten of Korean and foreign music charts, including the Gaon Digital Chart, with "Re-Bye" becoming a chart-topper. Billboard named Spring the fourth best K-pop album of the year, where the record "boast a more theatrical feel to them to show the young duo is growing an exciting pace." To promote the EP, the duo performed at Seoul Forest on Children's Day in front of 10,000 people and 100,000 live streamers via V Live, simultaneously. and toured in Asia, holding showcases at Taipei, Singapore, Kuala Lumpur, and Shanghai. On New Year's Day, they released the short film "Spring of Winter", correlating to their second seasonally themed album, Winter (2017). In the film, playing themselves, they argue and disband Akdong Musician, while songs from the new album acted as its soundtrack. Two days later, the duo released their second studio album, the second in a conceptual two-part album series Puberty. Its lead single, "Last Goodbye" (오랜 날 오랜 밤) became the second best-selling song within the first half the year, and the fourth within the entire year. It also became one of twelve songs to surpass 100 million streams in 2017, and was awarded Song of the Year (January) at the 7th Gaon Chart Music Awards and the Digital Bonsang at the 31st Golden Disc Awards. Its second lead single, "Reality" (리얼리티), was chosen by the viewers of My Little Television's live broadcast. The duo began a tour titled "AKMU Diary", holding concerts in seven cities nationwide, including eight sold-out shows in Seoul from March 23. Originally planned for six shows, two more shows were added due to the positive response of fans.

Marking their first experimentation in music with EDM, a challenge initiated to breakfree from the duo's usual acoustic mould, they released their first single album titled Summer Episode, on July 20, 2017, fronted by the lead singles "Dinosaur" and "My Darling". Based on the siblings' childhood, the former single peaked at number six on the Gaon Digital Chart, number nine on the US World Digital Song Sales Chart, and received greater attention in the following years, re-entering charts six years after its release. Summer Episode served as the duo's last release ahead of Lee Chan-hyuk's mandatory military enlistment with the Republic of Korea Marine Corps on September 18. Voluntarily enlisted early in comparison to other K-pop celebrities, he entered a training center in Pohang, North Gyeongsang Province. In this time, he wrote most of Sailing (2019) while living on a ship over two years during his enlistment, as he was inspired by the new experience. The 22-year-old fulfilled his mandatory military service with the Marine Corps and was discharged on May 29, 2019, thus also simultaneously resuming the activities of Akdong Musician.

=== 2019–2022: Sailing and continued success ===
After a two-year hiatus from the industry, the newly-renamed AKMU decided to permanently use the abridged version of the name, Akdong Musician, referencing a "mischievous child", to avoid feeling constrained in their musical pursuits by its meaning. The duo returned with their third studio album, Sailing, on September 25, 2019, supported by the lead single "How Can I Love the Heartbreak, You're the One I Love" (어떻게 이별까지 사랑하겠어, 널 사랑하는 거지), a song they had originally performed at the 2017 Someday Festival. The lead single topped the Gaon Digital Chart for the month of October, remained atop their country's largest streaming platform for over a month, the longest period since the chart's creation, and stayed within its top ten for one year and two months after its release. It sold 2.5 million copies, receiving a platinum certification for download from the Korea Music Content Association (KMCA), and was certified triple platinum for streaming. The song further won Artist of the Year (September) at the 9th Gaon Chart Music Awards and the Digital Bonsang at the 34th Golden Disc Awards. Notably, the album marked Su-hyun's first credited contribution to an AKMU song, "Farewell" (작별 인사), which she arranged. To commemorate the launch of Sailing, AKMU held a guerilla stage at Yeouido Hangang Park on September 29; it gathered over 30,000 people, 7-8 times larger than the size of the venue. Released on November 16, 2020, the digital single "Happening" expanded on the themes of their previous single and stylistically acted as a bridge to AKMU's next studio album.

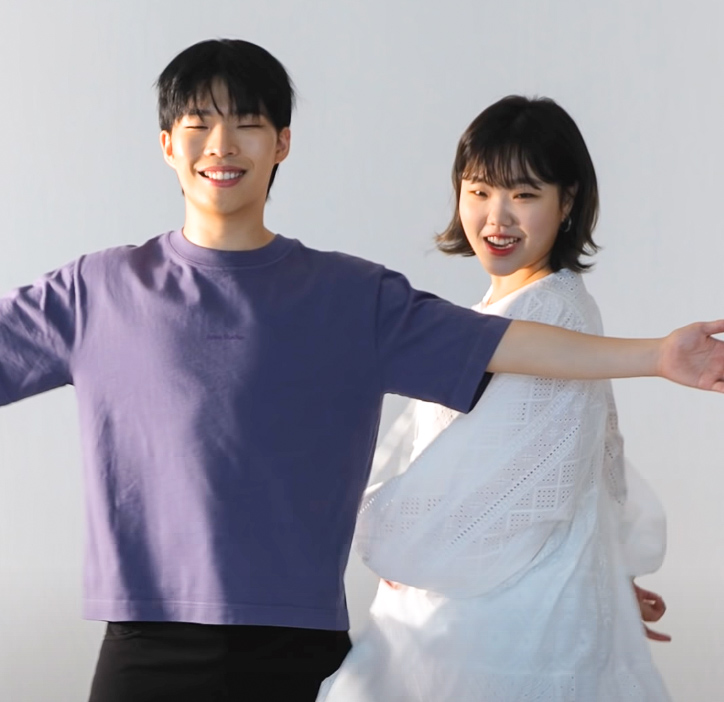
AKMU for Marie Claire Korea in August 2021

Following the end of AKMU's seven-year contract with YG Entertainment, the duo re-signed with the label for five more years, citing the reliable support and creative freedom as reasons. Their second EP, Next Episode, was released on July 26, 2021, with the lead single, "Nakka" (낙하) featuring IU. Described as a "collaboration album", it comprises seven songs, each featuring different artists including Lee Sun-hee, Beenzino, Crush, Sam Kim, Zion.T, and Choi Jung-hoon of indie rock band Jannabi, and served as an extension of Summer Episode (2017), exhibiting themes of freedom. Inspired by the film The Greatest Showman (2017), "Nakka" debuted at number three on the Gaon Digital Chart in the issue dated July 31, 2021, and rose to number one the following week, becoming their seventh chart-topping single. The single also peaked atop the Billboard K-pop Hot 100 for three consecutive weeks. Furthermore, Next Episode's tracks occupied seven spots in the top ten of the Gaon Download Chart, indicating the best-selling singles of the week. "Nakka" received a platinum certification for streaming by the KMCA, their second certified single since the system's implementation, and later won Best Pop Song at the 19th Korean Music Awards, Best Collaboration at the 2021 Mnet Asian Music Awards, and the Digital Bonsang at the 36th Golden Disc Awards. All seven songs were released with music videos, each depicting a theme from the seven songs included in the album.

=== 2023-present: Love Lee and independent label ===
Released on August 21, 2023, their digital single, Love Lee, primarily supported by the titular single of the same name, topped the Circle Digital Chart (formerly Gaon Digital Chart) for six non-consecutive weeks, and remained at number one on Korea's largest streaming platform for nine consecutive weeks, the longest among all releases that year. "Love Lee" became their first entry on the Billboard Global 200 and the Billboard Japan Heatseekers Songs Chart, peaking at number 91 and 4, respectively. Its choreography also garnered interest, with related dance challenges and short-form videos posted on TikTok amassing over 200 million views. "Love Lee" was later awarded Best Pop Song at the 21st Korea Music Awards, their second trophy in the category, and Best Vocal Performance Group at the 2023 MAMA Awards (formerly Mnet Asian Music Awards). Its B-side "Fry's Dream", found similar success, peaking at number two on the Circle Digital Chart, only behind "Love Lee", and topped the V Coloring Chart, a component chart of the Circle Chart, for two consecutive months, presented with V Coloring of the Year at the 13th Circle Chart Music Awards.

In commemoration of AKMU's tenth anniversary, the act held a two-day concert titled "10VE" at KSPO Dome in Seoul, garnering 21,000 attendees. In addition, their project further consisted their third EP Love Episode, with the lead single "Hero", released on June 3, 2024. It featured of six tracks, including their 2023 hit singles "Love Lee" and "Fry's Dream", and served as the third installment of AKMU's Episode series, following Summer Episode (2017) and Next Episode (2021). The EP was praised for its exploration of the universal emotion of love, conveyed through their distinct sensibility and language, and was met with widespread acclaim, securing high positions on Korean music charts.

In November 2025, AKMU decided to part ways with YG Entertainment after 12 years and reportedly in talks to establish an independent label. In January 2026, AKMU announced the establishment of their independent label Cemter of Inspiration, with the new label name emphasising its identity as a pure creative space, originally used by member Lee Chan-hyuk for his personal exhibition. On April 7, AKMU released their fourth studio album Flowering.

== Artistry ==
=== Image and reception ===
AKMU have been lauded for their musical sensibility and emulated traits of a "musical prodigy" and "genius" since their first appearance in public, at ages 16 and 13. The duo quickly established themselves as "true artists", displaying skills in songwriting and singing. Steve Choi of the Korea Music Content Association shared AKMU serves as the best representative of a diverse artist with the broadest musical spectrums, leading as the best inspiration and motivating factor for others. Furthermore, the duo excels and encompass any musical genre they delve into.

Beloved in their home country, the duo attained the honorific title "The Nation's Siblings".

== Other ventures ==
=== Endorsements ===
In the advertising industry, AKMU has represented for brands: Paris Baguette, EDM Education, Kia Motors's K3, KB Securities, and Lotte Chilsung. They have also endorsed for promotional campaigns of KT Corporation, Daum, Yogiyo, Life Plus, Chevrolet Korea, and Socar. Through YG Entertainment's collaboration with Woori Bank, the duo created a song with the credit card company to raise awareness of the Korean language, as part of celebrations for Hangul Day. Further collaborations include participating in a project for Daum, creating a song for Samsung, and theme songs for Nexon, namely KartRider's "Drift", and MapleStory's "We are all Adventurers". The duo are widely known to create commercial songs for the brands they endorse and represent, including for KT Corporation, Paris Baguette, and Lotte Chilsung. AKMU have also worked with governmental institutions, becoming youth ambassadors appointed by the Ministry of Gender Equality and Family in 2014.

AKMU's effect on the advertising industry was demonstrated through their commercial advert for KT Corporation, wherein the duo achieved results that equated an expenditure of ₩70 billion over two years to replicate the same success, raising consumer awareness by 90%; they were awarded Best Advertising Model at the 2013 Korea Advertising Awards. Paris Baguette had also observed an increase of 50% in product sales, after the duo became its newest models in 2013.

=== Philanthropy ===
Following their success on Kpop Star 2 (2012–2013) as its winners, the sibling duo donated their entire cash prize of ₩300 million ($290,000), following a discussion with their parents, including ₩100 million ($97,000) from a record production support fund. For their tenth anniversary, AKMU donated ₩141 million ($102,350) and ₩47 million each, commemorating their debut date, April 7, to Green Asia to prevent desertification by planting trees in Mongolia, Severance Hospital to support underprivileged people with incurable diseases, and the Korea Youth Counseling & Welfare Institute (KYCWI) to aid in mental health treatment for secluded and isolated teenagers. The duo have also participated in charity campaigns, including the Ice Bucket Challenge in 2014, where they opted to donating in lieu of pouring a bucket of ice water, and the Genie Music Challenge in 2016, where ₩1.94 million was donated to Snail of Love, contributing towards a cochlear implant surgery for an 18-month-old infant.

AKMU have further engaged themselves in volunteering activities, and have donated their talent through performances at the Hope for Lou Gehrig's Disease Concert in 2013, the YG X UNICEF Walking Festival in 2017, where all participation fees were donated to UNICEF Korea to treat children and adolescents of malnutrition, a charity event hosted by Compassion Korea in 2019, and a concert organized by the duo for pediatric patients at Seoul National University Hospital in 2023, where they distributed gifts and personally visited the patients unable to leave their rooms. The duo had also donated their talent to create the song "Happy World", a rendition of their self-composed single "Don't Cross Your Legs", exploring themes of youth issues such as school violence, gaming and cellphone addiction, and friendship, for the Ministry of Gender Equality and Family in 2014.

== Impact ==
AKMU's entry into the market showcased the future cultivation of "hallyu", the Korean culture wave; where their win in the audition program indicated the music consumers' level and point of view had improved and varied. It was further cited the beginning of AKMU raised the country's cultural consumption level. Analytic data provided by the Gaon Chart showed the duo were one of few rare artists in the country to not only have teenagers their own age consume and resonate with their music, but also with older age groups ranging up to their fifties equally as strong. In their career, artists that have cited the duo's work as an influence and as a role model include singer-songwriter Kang Ji-eum, Tomorrow X Together's Huening Kai, Itzy's Ryujin, and BabyMonster's Rami. AKMU has also been featured in listicles including Billboard 21 Under 21.

== Members ==
- Lee Chan-hyuk (이찬혁)
- Lee Su-hyun (이수현)

== Discography ==
- Play (2014)
- Winter (2017)
- Sailing (2019)
- Flowering (2026)

== Filmography ==
Year	Title	Notes	Ref.
2012–2013	K-pop Star Season 2	Finished in first place	
2016	You Hee-yeol's Sketchbook	Host for "Descendants of the Lyrics"	
2016	Law of the Jungle: Mongolia	Narrator; episode 1 (229)	
2017	Choovely's Outing	The Return of Superman spin-off	
2019	Sailing Log	YouTube series; 3 Episodes	
2020	Vroom Marble Game S2	Collaboration with Kia Motors	
2021	Long Live Independence	Regular cast	
2022	Take 1	Netflix series; episode 2	
2023	The Seasons: Long Day, Long Night with AKMU	Host	
2023	Siblings Next Door	YouTube series	

== Tours and concerts ==
=== Tours ===
AKMU Camp (2014)

Date	City	Country	Venue	Attendance	Ref.
November 21, 2014	Seoul	South Korea	Blue Square Samsung Card Hall	—N/a	
November 22, 2014	Seoul	South Korea	Blue Square Samsung Card Hall	—N/a	
November 23, 2014	Seoul	South Korea	Blue Square Samsung Card Hall	—N/a	
December 6, 2014	Daegu	South Korea	Chunma Art Center	—N/a	
December 24, 2014	Gwangju	South Korea	Kim Dae Jung Convention Center	—N/a	
December 31, 2014	Busan	South Korea	Busan Citizens' Hall	—N/a	

AKMU Studio (2016)

Date	City	Country	Venue	Attendance	Ref.
November 12, 2016	Taipei	Taiwan	Taipei International Convention Center	—N/a	
December 9, 2016	Singapore	Singapore	Kallang Theatre	—N/a	
December 22, 2016	Shanghai	China	Mercedes-Benz Arena (Shanghai)	—N/a	
December 26, 2016	Kuala Lumpur	Malaysia	KL Live Centre	—N/a	

AKMU Diary (2017)

Date	City	Country	Venue	Attendance	Ref.
March 23, 2017	Seoul	South Korea	Sogang University Mary Hall	4,000	
March 24, 2017	Seoul	South Korea	Sogang University Mary Hall	4,000	
March 25, 2017	Seoul	South Korea	Sogang University Mary Hall	4,000	
March 26, 2017	Seoul	South Korea	Sogang University Mary Hall	4,000	
March 30, 2017	Seoul	South Korea	Sogang University Mary Hall	4,000	
March 31, 2017	Seoul	South Korea	Sogang University Mary Hall	4,000	
April 1, 2017	Seoul	South Korea	Sogang University Mary Hall	4,000	
April 2, 2017	Seoul	South Korea	Sogang University Mary Hall	4,000	
April 15, 2017	Gwangju	South Korea	Gwangju Culture & Art Center	16,000	
April 22, 2017	Daegu	South Korea	Kyungpook National University Grand Hall	16,000	
May 12, 2017	Suwon	South Korea	Gyeonggi Arts Center	16,000	
May 27, 2017	Busan	South Korea	KBS Busan Hall	16,000	
June 3, 2017	Seongnam	South Korea	Seongnam Arts Center Opera House	16,000	
June 23, 2017	Daejeon	South Korea	Chungnam National University Jeong·Sim·Hwa Hall	16,000	
July 1, 2017	Incheon	South Korea	Incheon Culture & Arts Center	16,000	
July 15, 2017	Changwon	South Korea	KBS Changwon Hall	16,000	
July 22, 2017	Goyang	South Korea	Aram Theater	16,000	
Total				20,000	

AKMU Sailing Tour (2019–2020)

Date	City	Country	Venue	Attendance	Ref.
December 14, 2019	Seoul	South Korea	Kyung Hee University Grand Peace Palace		
December 15, 2019	Seoul	South Korea	Kyung Hee University Grand Peace Palace		
December 21, 2019	Gimhae	South Korea	West Gimhae Convention Center		
December 22, 2019	Gimhae	South Korea	West Gimhae Convention Center		
December 24, 2019	Daegu	South Korea	Daegu EXCO Auditorium		
December 25, 2019	Daegu	South Korea	Daegu EXCO Auditorium		
December 28, 2019	Gwangju	South Korea	Kim Dae Jung Convention Center		
January 4, 2020	Goyang	South Korea	Aram Nuri Art Center		
January 5, 2020	Goyang	South Korea	Aram Nuri Art Center		
January 11, 2020	Jinju	South Korea	Gyeongnam Culture & Art Center		
January 18, 2020	Busan	South Korea	Busan Exhibition and Convention Center		
January 19, 2020	Busan	South Korea	Busan Exhibition and Convention Center		
February 1, 2020	Incheon	South Korea	Incheon Culture & Art Center		
February 2, 2020	Incheon	South Korea	Incheon Culture & Art Center		
February 8, 2020	Changwon	South Korea	Seongsan Art Hall	Cancelled due to COVID	
February 9, 2020	Changwon	South Korea	Seongsan Art Hall	Cancelled due to COVID	
February 15, 2020	Seongnam	South Korea	Seongnam Arts Center	Cancelled due to COVID	
February 16, 2020	Seongnam	South Korea	Seongnam Arts Center	Cancelled due to COVID	
February 22, 2020	Suwon	South Korea	Gyeonggi Arts Center	Cancelled due to COVID	
February 23, 2020	Suwon	South Korea	Gyeonggi Arts Center	Cancelled due to COVID	
February 29, 2020	Ulsan	South Korea	KBS Ulsan Hall	Cancelled due to COVID	
March 1, 2020	Ulsan	South Korea	KBS Ulsan Hall	Cancelled due to COVID	
March 7, 2020	Cheonan	South Korea	Cheonan Arts Center	Cancelled due to COVID	
March 8, 2020	Cheonan	South Korea	Cheonan Arts Center	Cancelled due to COVID	
March 14, 2020	Chuncheon	South Korea	Baekryong Art Center Kangwon National University	Cancelled due to COVID	
March 21, 2020	Jeonju	South Korea	Sori Arts Center of Jeollabuk-do	Cancelled due to COVID	
March 29, 2020	Cheongju	South Korea	Cheongju Arts Center	Cancelled due to COVID	

Akmutopia (2023–2024)

Date	City	Country	Venue	Attendance	Ref.
November 24, 2023	Seoul	South Korea	Kyung Hee University Grand Peace Palace	—N/a	
November 25, 2023	Seoul	South Korea	Kyung Hee University Grand Peace Palace	—N/a	
November 26, 2023	Seoul	South Korea	Kyung Hee University Grand Peace Palace	—N/a	
December 2, 2023	Busan	South Korea	Busan Exhibition and Convention Center	—N/a	
December 3, 2023	Busan	South Korea	Busan Exhibition and Convention Center	—N/a	
December 9, 2023	Gwangju	South Korea	Gwangju Women's University Universiade Gymnasium	—N/a	
December 30, 2023	Changwon	South Korea	Changwon Exhibition and Convention Center	—N/a	
January 6, 2024	Suwon	South Korea	Suwon Convention Center	—N/a	
January 7, 2024	Suwon	South Korea	Suwon Convention Center	—N/a	
January 13, 2024	Suncheon	South Korea	Suncheon Bay Ecological and Cultural Education Center	—N/a	
January 20, 2024	Daejeon	South Korea	Daejeon Convention Center	—N/a	
January 21, 2024	Daejeon	South Korea	Daejeon Convention Center	—N/a	
January 27, 2024	Incheon	South Korea	Inspire Arena	14,000	
January 28, 2024	Incheon	South Korea	Inspire Arena	14,000	
Total				30,000	

AKMU On Air (2024)

Date	City	Country	Venue	Attendance	Ref.
November 30, 2024	Taipei	Taiwan	NTSU Arena	TBA	
December 15, 2024	Bangkok	Thailand	UOB Live	TBA	
January 11, 2025	Macau	China	Broadway Theater	TBA	

=== Concerts ===
10VE (2024)

Date	City	Country	Venue	Guests	Attendance	Ref.
June 15, 2024	Seoul	South Korea	KSPO Dome	Lee Hyori	21,000	
June 16, 2024	Seoul	South Korea	KSPO Dome	IU	21,000	

Akdongdeul (2025)

Date	City	Country	Venue	Attendance	Ref.
August 8, 2025	Seoul	South Korea	Myunghwa Live Hall	TBA	
August 9, 2025	Seoul	South Korea	Myunghwa Live Hall	TBA	
August 10, 2025	Seoul	South Korea	Myunghwa Live Hall	TBA	
August 15, 2025	Seoul	South Korea	Myunghwa Live Hall	TBA	
August 16, 2025	Seoul	South Korea	Myunghwa Live Hall	TBA	
August 17, 2025	Seoul	South Korea	Myunghwa Live Hall	TBA	
August 22, 2025	Seoul	South Korea	Myunghwa Live Hall	TBA	
August 23, 2025	Seoul	South Korea	Myunghwa Live Hall	TBA	
August 24, 2025	Seoul	South Korea	Myunghwa Live Hall	TBA	

Paradise of Rumors (2026)

Date	City	Country	Venue	Attendance	Ref.
Oct 9, 2026	Seoul	South Korea	KSPO Dome	10,000	
Oct 10, 2026	Seoul	South Korea	KSPO Dome	10,000	
Oct 11, 2026	Seoul	South Korea	KSPO Dome	10,000	

== Publications ==
- Raise Your Voice High! (목소리를 높여 high! (열림과 성장의 악동뮤지션 음악 에세이)) (Maribooks, ISBN 978-89-94011-44-8)
