= Flowering (album) =

Studio album by AKMU
- Released: April 7, 2026
- Length: 37:20
- Languages: Korean; English
- Label: Cemter of Inspiration
- Producer: Lee Chan-hyuk

AKMU chronology
Love Episode (2024)	Flowering (2026)

Singles from Flowering
- 1. "Joy, Sorrow, a Beautiful Heart" Released: April 7, 2026

Professional ratings
Review scores
Source	Rating
IZM	3/5 stars

Flowering (Korean: 개화; RR: Gaehwa) is the fourth studio album by South Korean brother-sister duo AKMU. It was released on April 7, 2026, through their own label Cemter of Inspiration. All tracks were solely written by member Lee Chan-hyuk, with "Joy, Sorrow, a Beautiful Heart" serving as the album's lead single.

== Background ==
On March 26, 2026, it was announced through AKMU's social media that the duo would release their fourth studio album titled Flowering, on April 7.

== Track listing ==
All tracks are written by Lee Chan-hyuk, and arranged by Lee Jin-hyub and Chan-hyuk, except "Tent" by only Chan-hyuk.

Flowering track listing
No.	Title	Length
1.	"Paradise of Rumors" (소문의 낙원)	3:38
2.	"Spring Colors" (봄 색깔)	3:10
3.	"Paid with Bugs" (벌레를 내고)	3:40
4.	"Joy, Sorrow, a Beautiful Heart" (기쁨, 슬픔, 아름다운 마음)	4:36
5.	"Sunshine Bless You" (햇빛 bless you)	3:51
6.	"Tent"	2:30
7.	"Young and Married" (어린 부부)	2:58
8.	"The Right Person" (옳은 사람)	3:42
9.	"Graceful Breakfast" (우아한 아침 식사)	3:08
10.	"Festival of Refugees" (난민들의 축제)	3:05
11.	"Stains" (얼룩)	3:02
Total length:		37:20

== Charts ==
Chart performance for Flowering
Chart (2026)	Peak position
South Korean Albums (KMCA)	14

== Sales ==
Sales for Flowering
Region	Sales
South Korea (KMCA) (Note: Sales figure as of April 2026.)	9,500

== Release history ==
Release dates and formats for Flowring
Region	Date	Format	Label
Various	April 7, 2026	CD; digital download; streaming	Cemter of Inspiration
