= Play (AKMU album) =

- Digital edition cover

Studio album by AKMU
- Released: April 7, 2014
- Recorded: 2013–2014
- Studio: YG (Seoul)
- Genre: K-pop; folk-pop
- Length: 38:17
- Language: Korean
- Label: YG; KT
- Producer: Lee Chan-hyuk

AKMU chronology
Play (2014)	Spring (2016)

Singles from Play
- 1. "200%" Released: April 7, 2014; 2. "Melted" Released: April 14, 2014; 3. "Give Love" Released: May 2, 2014

Alternative cover
- Physical edition

Play (stylized in all caps) is the debut studio album by South Korean brother-sister duo, AKMU, and their first release since winning K-pop Star 2 in 2012. It was released through YG Entertainment on April 7, 2014.

== Background ==
On March 31, 2014, YG Entertainment revealed the first teaser picture. On April 1, the second teaser picture was revealed, followed by the album's track list on April 2.

== Composition ==
Lee Chan-hyuk produced and wrote all the songs on the Play album. YG Entertainment's CEO Yang Hyun-suk explained,

"Up to now, I was in charge of producing albums for many singers. However, Akdong Musician's was the hardest for me. The musical genres I had mainly worked with were hip hop and R&B. However, Akdong Musician's genre is folk. It was a genre I have never tried before, so it was only right that they did it themselves. The two members of Akdong Musician debuted at an extremely young age. This year, Chan-hyuk will be 18 and Su-hyun will be 15. Because they are so young, if I were to order them to do this and that, their purity could get ruined. I decided it might actually be much more effective if the siblings personally [produced] it. As you can see by the results, this was verified after the album came out.

== Promotion and release ==
The album was digitally released on April 7, 2014. The album, consisting of 11 songs, was released worldwide through iTunes, Melon, Genie, and other online music portals. The physical album hit stores on April 9. The group's first stage comeback was on K-pop Star 3 on April 6. "200%" and "Melted" had been chosen directly as the title tracks, and the third title track, "Give Love", was chosen on April 14 after a round of fan voting.

== Accolades ==
In 2024, EBS named Play one of the 100 best Korean popular music albums since 2004.

Music program awards for "200%"
Program	Date	Ref.
M! Countdown	April 17, 2014	
M! Countdown	April 24, 2014	
M! Countdown	May 1, 2014	
Show! Music Core	April 19, 2014	
Show! Music Core	April 26, 2014	
Show! Music Core	May 3, 2014	
Show! Music Core	May 10, 2014	
Inkigayo	April 20, 2014	
Inkigayo	April 27, 2014	
Inkigayo	May 4, 2014	

== Track listing ==
All tracks are written by Lee Chan-hyuk

No.	Title	Arrangement	Length
1.	"Give Love"	Seogi; Shin Seung-ik	2:56
2.	"200%"	Rovin; Lee Chan-hyuk	3:13
3.	"Melted" (얼음들 (Note: Eoreumdeul lit. "Ice"))	Rovin	3:55
4.	"On the Subway" (지하철에서 (Note: Jihacheor-eseo))	Rovin; Lee Chan-hyuk	3:41
5.	"Hair Part" (가르마 (Note: Gareuma))	Rovin	3:46
6.	"Artificial Grass" (인공잔디 (Note: In-gong Jandi))	Rovin	3:45
7.	"Don't Hate Me" (안녕 (Note: Annyeong lit. "Hello"))	Philtre	3:47
8.	"Little Star" (작은별 (Note: Jageun Byeol))	Rovin	3:47
9.	"Anyway" (길이나 (Note: Girina))	Seogi; Shin Seung-ik	3:09
10.	"Idea" (소재 (Note: Sojae))	Rovin	3:19
11.	"Galaxy"	Seogi; Shin Seung-ik	2:59
Total length:			38:17

== Charts ==
=== Weekly charts ===
Weekly chart performance for Play
Chart (2014)	Peak position
South Korean Albums (Gaon)	1
US Heatseekers Albums (Billboard)	20
US World Albums (Billboard)	2

=== Year-end charts ===
Year-end chart performance for Play
Chart (2014)	Peak position	
Chart (2014)	South Korean Albums (Gaon)	57

== Release history ==
Country	Date	Format	Label
Various	April 7, 2014	Digital download; streaming	YG; KT
South Korea	April 9, 2014	CD	YG; KT
