= Summer Episode =

Single album by AKMU
- Released: July 20, 2017
- Recorded: 2017
- Genre: EDM
- Length: 7:45
- Label: YG; KT
- Producer: Lee Chan-hyuk

AKMU chronology
Winter (2017)	Summer Episode (2017)	Sailing (2019)

Singles from Summer Episode
- 1. "Dinosaur" Released: July 20, 2017; 2. "My Darling" Released: July 20, 2017

Summer Episode (stylized in all caps) is the first single album by South Korean brother-sister duo AKMU. It was released digitally by YG Entertainment on July 20, 2017. The single album features two title tracks – "Dinosaur" and "My Darling".

== Background ==
On July 10, 2017, South Korean news outlet Osen exclusively reported that AKMU is going to release a new song in July and have finished filming the music video for the same in Jeju Island. It was later confirmed by YG Entertainment on the same day. On July 14, YG Entertainment revealed two teaser images and a short clip announcing the comeback scheduled on July 20.

== Composition ==
The first track, "Dinosaur" marks AKMU's first attempt on electronic dance music genre. Lyrically the song talks about waking up from nightmare of a dinosaur and fighting against it. It is based on Lee Chan-hyuk's childhood memory of similar real-life incident. Tamar Herman of Billboard explains that AKMU's "nostalgic approach to dance music ... showcases a new side to the Lee siblings in a way that still retains the wholesome AKMU charm." The second track, "My Darling" was described as an "acoustic song with cute lyrics with repetitive hooks and easy melodies".

== Track listing ==
All tracks are written by Lee Chan-hyuk and arranged by Rovin

Summer Episode
No.	Title	Length
1.	"Dinosaur"	4:00
2.	"My Darling"	3:45
Total length:		7:45

Summer Episode – iTunes/Apple Music only (bonus tracks)
No.	Title	Length
3.	"Dinosaur" (Instrumental)	4:00
4.	"My Darling" (Instrumental)	3:45
Total length:		15:30

== Release history ==
Release history for Summer Episode
Region	Date	Format	Label
Various	July 20, 2017	Digital download; streaming	YG; KT
