= Love Lee =

2023 single by AKMU

Single by AKMU

from the EP Love Episode
- Language: Korean
- B-side: "Fry's Dream"
- Released: August 21, 2023
- Studio: YG (Seoul)
- Genre: Folk; dance
- Length: 2:59
- Label: YG
- Composers: Lee Chan-hyuk; Millennium; Sihwang
- Lyricist: Lee Chan-hyuk
- Producer: Lee Chan-hyuk

AKMU singles chronology
| "Nakka" (2021) | "Love Lee" (2023) | "Hero" (2024) |

Music video
- "Love Lee" on YouTube

"Love Lee" is a song by South Korean duo AKMU from their third EP Love Episode. It was released as a single alongside its B-side "Fry's Dream" on August 21, 2023, by YG Entertainment. The song is the duo's first music in about two years since their extended play Next Episode (2021). "Love Lee" debuted at number one on the Circle Digital Chart, the group's eighth number-one single. It stayed atop the chart for six non consecutive weeks.

== Background and composition ==
On August 9, 2023, YG Entertainment uploaded a short video titled "AKMU Is Coming", announcing their new music to be released on the 21st. The video depicts a fresh pink city unfolding on a mobile phone screen. Su-hyun, portrayed as a Cupid character, approached the place where Chan-hyuk was, and the line continued in the shape of a heart. The next day, the duo revealed the poster of the siblings wearing colorful costumes and balaclava, staring into the lens, and unveiling the new single titled "Love Lee". First performed at their 2014 concert tour AKMU Camp, "Fry's Dream" was also included on the single as B-side due to the duo's fan requests.

AKMU introduced the single "Love Lee" at a press conference held in Seoul on August 21, the release date. According to Chan-hyuk, the song's main composer and sole lyricist, the song "Love Lee" can be seen as the "second edition" of the duo's debut single, "200%": "With '200%,' We sang with a naivety, unaware of what the public wanted from us. We put ourselves out there and sang what we wanted with confidence. Since then, we've explored different genres, and now I think we know a tad better about what people expect from us. 'Love Lee' is a song that we wrote as a gift for them." Musically, "Love Lee" combines the duo's vocals against a backdrop of "acoustic tones and rhythmic drums". Its title is a portmanteau of the word "lovely" and the siblings' last name "Lee". The B-side "Fry's Dream" features instrumentation from a synthesizer with lyrics "personifying fried eggs".

== Music video and promotion ==
An accompanying music video for "Love Lee" premiered on August 21, 2023, in conjunction with the single release, preceded by one teaser. The music video depicts Su-hyun as Cupid helping Chan-hyuk to propose marriage. AKMU performed the song at several music shows: M Countdown, Show! Music Core, Inkigayo, and The Seasons.

== Accolades ==
Awards and nominations for "Love Lee"
| Ceremony | Year | Award | Result | Ref. |
|---|---|---|---|---|
| MAMA Awards | 2023 | Song of the Year | Longlisted | |
| MAMA Awards | 2023 | Best Vocal Performance Group | Won | |

Music program awards for "Love Lee"
| Program | Date | Ref. |
|---|---|---|
| Show! Music Core | September 16, 2023 | |
| Show! Music Core | September 23, 2023 | |
| Inkigayo | September 17, 2023 | |
| Inkigayo | October 15, 2023 | |
| Inkigayo | October 22, 2023 | |

Year-end lists for ""
| Critic/Publication | List | Rank | Ref. |
|---|---|---|---|
| Grammy | 15 K-Pop Songs That Took 2023 By Storm | N/A | |

== Track listing ==
All track are written lyrics and produced by Lee Chan-hyuk.

"Love Lee" track listing
| No. | Title | Music | Length |
|---|---|---|---|
| 1. | "Love Lee" | Lee Chan-hyuk; Millennium; Sihwang | 2:59 |
| 2. | "Fry's Dream" (후라이의 꿈) | Lee; Rovin | 3:24 |
| Total length: | | | 6:24 |

== Credits and personnel ==
Personnel

- Lee Chan-hyuk – vocals, lyrics, composition, producer
- Lee Su-hyun – vocals
- Millennium – composition
- Sihwang – composition
- Lee Kyung-joon – recording
- Shin Sung-kwon – recording
- Lee Ji-hun – recording
- Bang Dae-hyung – recording
- Nam Jung-woo – recording
- Jason Roberts – mixing
- Chris Gehringer – mastering

Locations

- YG Studio (Seoul) – recording
- TheLab (Los Angeles, CA) – mixing
- Sterling Sound (New York City, NY) – mastering

== Charts ==
=== Weekly charts ===
Weekly chart performance for "Love Lee"
| Chart (2023) | Peak position |
|---|---|
| Global 200 (Billboard) | 91 |
| Japan Heatseekers (Billboard Japan) | 4 |
| Japan Streaming (Billboard Japan) | 99 |
| South Korea (Circle) | 1 |

=== Monthly charts ===
Monthly chart performance for "Love Lee"
| Chart (2023) | Position |
|---|---|
| South Korea (Circle) | 1 |

=== Year-end charts ===
2023 year-end chart performance for "Love Lee"
| Chart (2023) | Position |
|---|---|
| South Korea (Circle) | 32 |

2024 year-end chart performance for "Love Lee"
| Chart (2024) | Position |
|---|---|
| South Korea (Circle) | 49 |

== Certifications ==
Certifications for "Love Lee"
| Region | Certification | Certified units/sales |
Streaming
| South Korea (KMCA) | Platinum | 100,000,000^{†} |
^{†} Streaming-only figures based on certification alone.
