= Winter (AKMU album) =

Studio album by AKMU
- Released: January 3, 2017
- Recorded: 2016
- Genre: K-pop; folk-pop
- Length: 30:16
- Language: Korean
- Label: YG; KT
- Producer: Lee Chan-hyuk

AKMU chronology
Spring (2016)	Winter (2017)	Summer Episode (2017)

Singles from Winter
- 1. "Last Goodbye" Released: January 3, 2017; 2. "Reality" Released: January 3, 2017

Winter (Korean: 사춘기 하; Hanja: 思春記 下; RR: Sachun-gi Ha) is the second studio album by South Korean brother-sister duo, AKMU.

== Background ==
On December 22, 2016, YG Entertainment uploaded a poster that announces the release of AKMU's 20-minute long musical short film Spring of Winter, and announcing the release of the duo second full album Winter with the date set on January 3, 2017. On December 28, 2016, The full track list was revealed, with Lee Chan-hyuk producing and writing all the songs on the album.

== Promotion and release ==
AKMU held Special Music Event: Winter Theater on December 28, 2016, a special event with the fans to listen to their new songs from the album before releasing it. On January 1, 2017, a short musical film was released.

== Track listing ==
All tracks are written by Lee Chan-hyuk.

No.	Title	Arrangement	Length
1.	"Live" (생방송 (Note: Saengbangsong))	minGtion	4:03
2.	"Reality" (리얼리티 (Note: Rieolliti))	Lee Hyun-young	2:53
3.	"Last Goodbye" (오랜 날 오랜 밤 (Note: Oraen Nal Oraen Bam lit. "Long day, long night"))	Shin Seung-ik; Seogi	4:44
4.	"Play Ugly" (못생긴 척 (Note: Motsaenggin Cheok lit. "Pretend to be ugly"))	Robin	3:19
5.	"Chocolady"	Lee Hyun-young	4:03
6.	"You Know Me"	Robin	3:01
7.	"Way Back Home" (집에 돌아오는 길 (Note: Jibe Doraoneun Gil))	Robin	3:48
8.	"Will Last Forever" (그때 그 아이들은 (Note: Geuttae Geu Aideureun lit. "Then, those children"))	philtre	4:25
Total length:			30:16

== Release history ==
Country	Date	Format	Label
Worldwide	January 3, 2017	CD; Digital download	YG; KT
