= Spring (AKMU EP) =

- Digital album cover

EP by AKMU
- Released: May 4, 2016
- Genre: K-pop; folk-pop
- Length: 21:29
- Language: Korean
- Label: YG; KT
- Producer: Lee Chan-hyuk

AKMU chronology
Play (2014)	Spring (2016)	Winter (2017)

Alternative cover
- Physical album cover

Singles from Spring
- 1. "Re-Bye" Released: May 4, 2016; 2. "How People Move" Released: May 4, 2016

Spring (Korean: 사춘기 상; Hanja: 思春記 上; RR: Sachungi sang) is the first extended play and second musical release by South Korean brother-sister duo, AKMU.

== Background ==
On April 25, 2016, YG Entertainment revealed the first teaser picture, with the title of the album. On April 27, they released an artist film for the album. Two days later, the album's track list was revealed.

== Promotion and release ==
The album was released digitally on May 5 and physically on May 11, 2016. AKMU held a mini-concert on May 5. The concert was broadcast on Naver's V app.

== Track listing ==
All tracks are written by Lee Chan-hyuk.

No.	Title	Arrangement	Length
1.	"Re-Bye"	Robin	3:09
2.	"How People Move" (사람들이 움직이는 게; Saramdeuri umjigineun ge; 'People moving')	Robin	3:22
3.	"Haughty Girl" (새삼스럽게 왜; Saesamseureopge wae; 'Needless to say, why')	Seogi; Shin Seung-ik	3:19
4.	"Green Window" (초록창가; Chorokchangga)	Kang Wook-jin	3:20
5.	"Every Little Thing" (사소한 것에서; Sasohan geoseseo; 'At a little thing')	Robin	4:17
6.	"Around" (주변인; Jubyeonin; 'Outsider')	Robin	4:02
Total length:			21:29

== Release history ==
Country	Date	Format	Label
Various	May 4, 2016	Digital download	YG; KT
South Korea	May 11, 2016	CD	YG; KT
