= Lee Sun-hee (singer) =

South Korean musician (born 1964)

Lee Sun hee
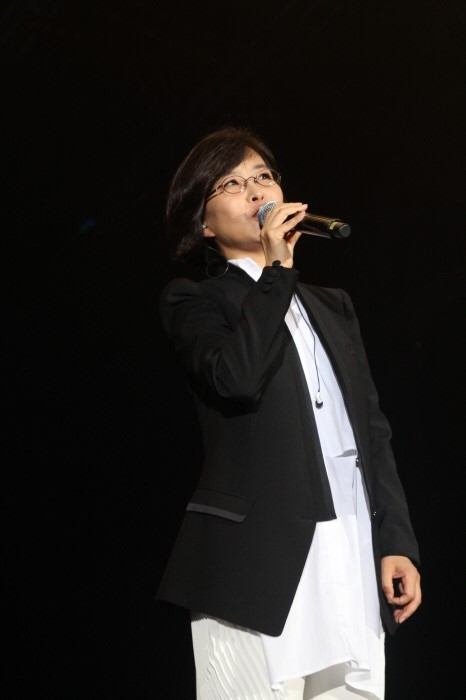
- Lee Sun hee in 2012

Background information
- Born: November 11, 1964 (age 61); Poryong, South Chungchon, South Korea
- Occupation: Singer
- Years active: 1984–present
- Label: Hook Entertainment

Korean name
- Hangul: 이선희
- Hanja: 李仙姬
- RR: I Seonhui
- MR: I Sŏnhŭi

Lee Sun-hee (Korean: 이선희; born November 11, 1964) is a South Korean singer-songwriter. She is often referred to as South Korea's "National Diva" for her immense popularity, commercial success, and vocal ability.

Lee debuted in 1984 with the song, "To J," for which she won first prize in the MBC Riverside Song Festival. She released her first album, Ah! The Good Old Days, the following year in 1985. She released a string of successful albums in the 1980s and early 1990s, and won awards at KBS Song Festival and MBC Ten Singers Song Festival every year from 1984 to 1990, as well as main prize at the Golden Disc Awards every year from 1986 to 1990.

The government of South Korea awarded Lee the prestigious Prime Minister's Commendation in 2010 for her contributions to popular culture. In 2011, Lee became the fourth South Korean singer to ever perform at Carnegie Hall. She released her 15th album, Serendipity in 2014. In 2018, she performed in Pyongyang as a part of Spring is Coming and became one of few South Korean singers to perform twice in North Korea. She released her 16th album, Anbu in 2020.

== Early life and education ==
Lee was born in 1964 in Poryong, South Chungchon, South Korea. She was raised near a secluded Buddhist temple by her mother and her father, a Buddhist monk who belongs to a sect of the religion that allows monks to marry and have children. She attended Sangmyung High School and graduated from Inchon City College in 1984 with a degree in environmental management.

== Career ==
While she was a student at Incheon City College, Lee participated in the 5th MBC Riverside Song Festival as a member of the singing duo Act 4 Scene 5 (4막 5장) with fellow student Im Sung-kyun. They won the grand prize with the song, "To J", which became a hit, garnering Lee prizes for best new artist at the year-end KBS Music Awards and MBC Top 10 Singers Song Festival. Her signature boyish look was also a hit, causing a so-called "Lee Sun-hee syndrome," or craze, among female students who imitated her short haircut and round glasses.

=== Musical style ===
Lee Sun-hee possesses a warm, lyric soprano voice with sturdy lows and bombastic highs. In addition to being a vocalist, Lee Sun-hee is also a songwriter, writing many of the songs on her later albums including the celebrated hit 'Fate'. During her 30th anniversary concert tour, Sun-hee broadcast a clip during the intermission revealing her three biggest musical influences: Barbra Streisand, Madonna, and Whitney Houston. She has mentioned South Korean vocalist Song Chang-sik as one of her influences and role models.

== Discography ==
=== Studio albums ===
Title	Album details	Peak chart positions	Sales
Title	Album details	KOR	Sales
Ah! The Good Old Days (아! 옛날이여)	Released: January 25, 1985; Label: Jigu Records; Formats: LP, cassette	No data	
West Wind (갈바람)	Released: November 25, 1985; Label: Jigu Records; Formats: LP, cassette	No data	
I Want to Know (알고 싶어요)	Released: November 30, 1986; Label: Jigu Records; Formats: LP, cassette	No data	
Where the Love Falls / I Always Miss You (사랑이 지는 이 자리 / 나 항상 그대를)	Released: February 1, 1988; Label: Seoul Records; Formats: LP, cassette	No data	KOR: 1,000,000+
My Street / A Bout of Laughter (나의 거리 / 한바탕 웃음으로)	Released: April 10, 1989; Label: Seoul Records; Formats: CD, cassette	No data	KOR: 1,000,000+
Turning the Pages of Memories / Why Me (추억의 책장을 넘기면 / 왜 나만)	Released: August 20, 1990; Label: Seoul Records; Formats: CD, cassette	No data	KOR: 1,000,000+
If You Love Me (그대가 나를 사랑하신다면)	Released: July 1991; Label: Seoul Records; Formats: CD, cassette	No data	
Small Boat (조각배)	Released: August 1992; Label: Seoul Records; Formats: CD, cassette	No data	
Chrysanthemum (한송이 국화)	Released: March 3, 1994; Label: Seoul Records; Formats: CD, cassette	No data	
First Love	Released: October 24, 1996; Label: Yedang Entertainment; Formats: CD, cassette	No data	
Dream of Ruby	Released: November 2, 1998; Label: Yedang Entertainment; Formats: CD, cassette	20	KOR: 30,319+
My Life And Best	Released: March 26, 2001; Label: Yedang Entertainment; Formats: CD, cassette	38	KOR: 36,122+
Puberty (사춘기; 四春期)	Released: April 14, 2005; Label: Hook Entertainment; Formats: CD, cassette	15	KOR: 27,537+
Dear Love... (사랑아...)	Released: February 25, 2009; Label: Hook Entertainment; Formats: CD	89	—N/a
Serendipity	Released: March 26, 2014; Label: Hook Entertainment; Formats: CD, digital download	4	KOR: 37,026+
Anbu (안부)	Released: June 15, 2020; Label: Hook Entertainment; Formats: CD, digital download	20	—N/a
* There is no chart data for 2009, but Dear Love... charted on the Gaon Album Chart in 2013.

=== Collaborations ===
Title	Year	Peak chart positions		Album
Title	Year	KOR Gaon	KOR Hot	Album
"Hey Kid, Close Your Eyes" (전쟁터) (with AKMU)	2021	24	15	Next Episode

=== OST albums ===
- KBS drama 《Fireworks》 released in 1984
- MBC animation 《The Little Princess Sara》 released in 1986
- MBC drama 《Blue Classroom》 released in 1987
- KBS animation 《Run Hani》 released in 1988
- KBS animation 《Reckless Hani》 released in 1989
- SBS drama 《Fear With No Love》 released in 1992
- MBC drama 《Gips Family》 released in 2000
- Movie 《The Beauty In Dream》 released in 2002
- Movie 《The King and the Clown》 released in 2005
- Movie 《The Sword with No Name》 released in 2009
- SBS drama 《My Girlfriend Is a Gumiho》 released in 2010
- SBS drama 《Big Thing (TV series)》 released in 2010
- SBS drama 《The Legend of the Blue Sea》 released in 2016
- MBC drama 《The Red Sleeve》 released in 2021

== Filmography ==
=== Television shows ===
Year	Title	Network	Role	Notes	Ref.
2020–present	Sing Again	JTBC	Judge	Season 1–2	
2022	The Road with Songs	KBS2	Host	with Lee Geum-hee	

== Awards ==
=== Awards and nominations ===
Name of the award, year presented, award category, nominee and result of the nomination
Award	Year	Category	Nominee/work	Result	Ref.
Baeksang Arts Awards	1999	Popularity Award (Theater Division)	Bari, The Forgotten Lullaby	Won	
Golden Disc Awards	1986	Main Prize (Bonsang)	West Wind (갈바람)	Won	
Golden Disc Awards	1987	Main Prize (Bonsang)	I Want to Know (알고 싶어요)	Won	
Golden Disc Awards	1988	Main Prize (Bonsang)	I Always Miss You (나 항상 그대를)	Won	
Golden Disc Awards	1989	Main Prize (Bonsang)	My Street (나의 거리)	Won	
Golden Disc Awards	1990	Main Prize (Bonsang)	A Bout of Laughter (한바탕 웃음으로)	Won	
KBS Music Awards	1984	Best New Female Artist	Lee Sun-hee	Won	
KBS Music Awards	1987	Singer of the Year (Bonsang)	Lee Sun-hee	Won	
KBS Music Awards	1988	Singer of the Year (Bonsang)	Lee Sun-hee	Won	
KBS Music Awards	1989	Singer of the Year (Bonsang)	Lee Sun-hee	Won	
KBS Music Awards	1990	Singer of the Year (Bonsang)	Lee Sun-hee	Won	
KBS Music Awards	1994	Singer of the Year (Bonsang)	Lee Sun-hee	Won	
KBS Music Awards	1995	Singer of the Year (Bonsang)	Lee Sun-hee	Won	
KBS Music Awards	1996	Singer of the Year (Bonsang)	Lee Sun-hee	Won	
MBC Gayo Daejejeon	1984	Best Popular Song	"To J" (J에게)	Won	
MBC Gayo Daejejeon	1984	Best New Artist	Lee Sun-hee	Won	
MBC Gayo Daejejeon	1984	Popular Singer Award (Bonsang)	Lee Sun-hee	Won	
MBC Gayo Daejejeon	1985	Popular Singer Award (Bonsang)	Lee Sun-hee	Won	
MBC Gayo Daejejeon	1986	Popular Singer Award (Bonsang)	Lee Sun-hee	Won	
MBC Gayo Daejejeon	1988	Popular Singer Award (Bonsang)	Lee Sun-hee	Won	
MBC Gayo Daejejeon	1989	Popular Singer Award (Bonsang)	Lee Sun-hee	Won	
MBC Gayo Daejejeon	1990	Popular Singer Award (Bonsang)	Lee Sun-hee	Won	
MBC Gayo Daejejeon	2001	Popular Singer Award (Bonsang)	Lee Sun-hee	Won	
MBC Riverside Song Festival	1984	Grand Prize (Daesang)	"To J" (J에게)	Won	
Melon Music Awards	2018	Stage of the Year	Lee Sun-hee	Won	
Mnet Asian Music Awards	2014	Best Vocal Performance (Female)	"Meet Him Among Them" (그 중에 그대를 만나)	Nominated	

=== State honors ===
Country	Year	Honor	Ref.
South Korea	2010	Prime Minister's Commendation (Note: Honors are given at the Korean Popular Culture and Arts Awards, arranged by the Korea Creative Content Agency and hosted by the Ministry of Culture, Sports and Tourism. They are awarded to those who have contributed to the arts and South Korea's pop culture.)	
