= K-pop Star 2 =

Music audition TV show in South Korea

- Season 2
- Hosted by: Yoon Do-hyun; Boom
- Judges: BoA; Park Jin-young; Yang Hyun-suk
- Winner: Akdong Musician
- Runner-up: Bang Ye-dam

Release
- Original network: SBS
- Original release: November 18, 2012 – April 14, 2013

Season chronology
- ← Previous; K-pop Star 1 Next → K-pop Star 3

The second season of the South Korean reality television competition show K-pop Star premiered on SBS on November 18, 2012, airing Sunday evenings at 4:55 pm KST as part of the Good Sunday lineup. Yoon Do-hyun returned as host and narrator, and Boom returned as live host. Yang Hyun-suk, Park Jin-young, and BoA returned as judges. The season ended on April 6, 2013, with Akdong Musician crowned as winner and chose to sign with YG Entertainment.

Contestants from the Top 10 of Season 2 returned for a special Dream Stage - Best of the Best episode on April 14, 2013, competing with contestants of Season 1 for the title of Overall Champion.

== Process ==
Audition applications and Preliminary auditions were between June and October 2012. Preliminary auditions were held in Canada, United States, Australia, and England.
The First round: Talent Audition - Check for talents and skills with airdate: November 18 – December 2, 2012.
The Second round: Ranking Audition - Audition and ranking by judges with airdate: December 9–23, 2012.
The Third round: Casting Audition - Being cast by one of three companies for a two-week training session with airdate: December 30, 2012 – January 20, 2013.
Fourth round: Battle Audition - Competing for a spot in the Top 10 to advance to the live competition with airdate: January 27 – February 10, 2013.
Fifth round: Stage Audition - Judges decide and viewers vote during live competition to decide the final winner with airdate: February 17 – April 7, 2013.

== Judges ==
- Yang Hyun-suk : YG Entertainment CEO, producer, singer
- Park Jin-young : JYP Entertainment Executive producer, singer, songwriter
- BoA : SM Entertainment singer, dancer, songwriter, record producer

== Top 10 ==
- Akdong Musician : Winner, debuted as duo AKMU under YG Entertainment
  - Lee Chan-hyuk : Born 1996, from Uijeongbu
  - Lee Soo-hyun : Born 1999, from Uijeongbu
- Bang Ye-dam : Born 2002, from Seoul, Runner-up, signed under YG Entertainment, debuted in boy group Treasure
- Andrew Choi : Born 1980, from Seoul, eliminated March 31, 2013 (6th Live), debuted as soloist under Iconic Sounds
- 2,000 Won : eliminated March 24, 2013 (5th Live), debuted as duo under Reve Entertainment
  - Kim Hyo-bin : Born 1990, from Gyeonggi Province
  - Kim Il-do : Born 1990, from Gyeonggi Province
- Raccoon Boys : eliminated March 17, 2013 (4th Live)
  - Brian Shin : Born 1995, from Cupertino, United States, releasing music as brian mantra
  - Kim Min-seok : Born 1991, from Asan, signed under NH Media
  - McKay Kim : Born 1993, from San Diego, United States, debuted as soloist under Dorothy Company
- Shin Ji-hoon : Born 1998, eliminated March 10, 2013 (3rd Live), debuted as soloist under Cube Entertainment and now under Starline Entertainment. Joined The Unit
- YouU : eliminated March 3, 2013 (2nd Live)
  - Jun Min-joo : Born 1994, from Seoul, debuted in girl group The Ark under Music K Entertainment, formerly under Maroo Entertainment in duo KHAN
  - Lee Mi-rim : Born 1995, from Seongnam, debuted in girl group TINT under GH Entertainment
  - Park So-yeon : Born 1999, from Namyangju, signed under LOEN Entertainment, later participated in Produce 101, debuted as a soloist in December 2020 under GCSC Company
  - Son Yu-ji : Born 1998, from Bucheon, signed under DSP Media, later participated in Kara Project, now under GH Entertainment
  - Song Ha-ye : Born 1994, from Seoul, debuted as soloist under Hello Music and now under Plus Media Entertainment
- Choi Ye-geun : Born 1997, from Pyeongtaek, eliminated March 3, 2013 (2nd Live), debuted as soloist under Reve Entertainment
- Sung Su-jin : Born 1989, from Seoul, eliminated February 24, 2013 (1st Live), signed under Crazy Sound
- Lee Jin-woo : Born 1990, from United States, eliminated February 24, 2013 (1st Live), debuted as soloist JL

== Round 5: Stage Auditions ==
For Rounds 1 to 3, the Top 10 competes 1:1 on the live stage with the results determined by the judges. One contestant from each group is chosen to proceed to the next round. As of Round 4, the Judges Score 70% and Viewers SMS Vote 30% are combined to eliminate the contestant with the lowest score.

For Rounds 1 to 3, the contestants not chosen will go through live SMS voting by viewers, where the top two contestants (top contestant only after Round 1) proceed to the next round. SMS voting is only allowed for contestants during that groups performance. As of Round 4, SMS voting is allowed throughout all performances.

Of the remaining contestants, the judges use a "Wild Card" to save one of them in Rounds 1 to 3.

Episode #	Group	Order	Name	Song - Original Artist	Judges Decision			SMS Vote/ Wild Card	Result
Episode #	Group	Order	Name	Song - Original Artist	SM	YG	JYP	SMS Vote/ Wild Card	Result
Round 1: Dream Stage (February 17 & 24)
14	1	1	Lee Jin-woo	슬픔활용법 - Kim Bum-soo	Choi Ye-geun	Choi Ye-geun	Choi Ye-geun	-	Eliminated
14	1	2	Choi Ye-geun	Girls On Top - BoA	Choi Ye-geun	Choi Ye-geun	Choi Ye-geun	N/A	Top 8
14	2	3	YouU	Ugly - 2NE1	YouU	Sung Su-jin	YouU	N/A	Top 8
14	2	4	Sung Su-jin	So Sick - Ne-Yo	YouU	Sung Su-jin	YouU	-	Eliminated
14	3	5	Akdong Musician	라면인건가 - Self-Written Song	Andrew Choi	Andrew Choi	Akdong Musician	1st	Top 8
14	3	6	Andrew Choi	그 XX - G-Dragon	Andrew Choi	Andrew Choi	Akdong Musician	N/A	Top 8
15	4	7	2,000 Won	Elevator - Park Jin-young	Bang Ye-dam	Bang Ye-dam	Bang Ye-dam	Wild Card	Top 8
15	4	8	Bang Ye-dam	Black or White - Michael Jackson	Bang Ye-dam	Bang Ye-dam	Bang Ye-dam	N/A	Top 8
15	5	9	Shin Ji-hoon	You Are Not Alone - Michael Jackson	Raccoon Boys	Raccoon Boys	Shin Ji-hoon	2nd	Top 8
15	5	10	Raccoon Boys	Love on Top - Beyoncé	Raccoon Boys	Raccoon Boys	Shin Ji-hoon	N/A	Top 8
Round 2 (March 3)
16	1	1	Choi Ye-geun	Price Tag - Jessie J	Andrew Choi	Andrew Choi	Choi Ye-geun	-	Eliminated
16	1	2	Andrew Choi	DJ Got Us Fallin' in Love - Usher	Andrew Choi	Andrew Choi	Choi Ye-geun	N/A	Top 6
16	2	3	YouU	난 여자가 있는데 - Park Jin-young	Shin Ji-hoon	Shin Ji-hoon	Shin Ji-hoon	-	Eliminated
16	2	4	Shin Ji-hoon	편지 - Kim Kwang-jin	Shin Ji-hoon	Shin Ji-hoon	Shin Ji-hoon	N/A	Top 6
16	3	5	Raccoon Boys	Now - Fin.K.L	Bang Ye-dam	Bang Ye-dam	Bang Ye-dam	Wild Card	Top 6
16	3	6	Bang Ye-dam	Sir Duke - Stevie Wonder	Bang Ye-dam	Bang Ye-dam	Bang Ye-dam	N/A	Top 6
16	4	7	2,000 Won	나 혼자 - SISTAR	Akdong Musician	Akdong Musician	2,000 Won	1st	Top 6
16	4	8	Akdong Musician	Ring Ding Dong - SHINee	Akdong Musician	Akdong Musician	2,000 Won	N/A	Top 6
Round 3 (March 10)
17	1	1	Andrew Choi	죽겠네 - 10cm	Andrew Choi	Andrew Choi	Andrew Choi	N/A	Top 5
17	1	2	Raccoon Boys	So Hot - Wonder Girls	Andrew Choi	Andrew Choi	Andrew Choi	Wild Card	Top 5
17	2	3	Shin Ji-hoon	You Raise Me Up - Secret Garden	Akdong Musician	Akdong Musician	Akdong Musician	-	Eliminated
17	2	4	Akdong Musician	Crescendo - Self-Written Song	Akdong Musician	Akdong Musician	Akdong Musician	N/A	Top 5
17	3	5	2,000 Won	개구쟁이 - Sanulrim	2,000 Won	Bang Ye-dam	Bang Ye-dam	1st	Top 5
17	3	6	Bang Ye-dam	I Do - Rain	2,000 Won	Bang Ye-dam	Bang Ye-dam	N/A	Top 5
Round 4: Casting Mission (March 17)
18	1		2,000 Won	Lonely - 2NE1	89	87	85	-	YG Casting
18	2		Bang Ye-dam	"When a Man Loves a Woman" - Michael Bolton	93	95	98	-	JYP Casting
18	3		Andrew Choi	잠 못드는 밤 비는 내리고 - Kim Gun-mo	93	90	90	-	SM Casting
18	4		Raccoon Boys	I'll Be Missing You - Puff Daddy	88	83	85	-	Eliminated
18	5		Akdong Musician	Officially Missing You - Tamia	94	95	98	-	SM Casting
Round 5 (March 24)
19	1		Andrew Choi	빗속에서 - Lee Moon-sae	95	90	96	-	SM Casting
19	2		Bang Ye-dam	너뿐이야 - Park Jin-young	93	85	94	-	YG Casting
19	3		2,000 Won	Million Roses - Sim Soo-bong	95	88	82	-	Eliminated
19	4		Akdong Musician	사랑은 은하수 다방에서 - 10cm	95	88	85	-	JYP Casting
Round 6: Semifinal (March 31)
20	1		Bang Ye-dam	Where Is the Love? - Black Eyed Peas	89	90	92	-	Top 2
20	2		Andrew Choi	Baby - Justin Bieber	90	86	89	-	Eliminated
20	3		Akdong Musician	외국인의 고백 - Self-Written Song	91	92	94	-	Top 2
Round 7: Final (April 7)
21	Mission 7–1. Sing Each Other's Cover								
21	1		Bang Ye-dam	Officially Missing You - Tamia	96	95	98	-	-
21	2		Akdong Musician	MMMBop - Hanson	96	98	97	-	-
21	Mission 7–2. Judges Chosen Song								
21	1		Bang Ye-dam	Karma Chameleon - Culture Club	94	93	94	-	Runner-up
21	2		Akdong Musician	뜨거운 안녕 - Toy	95	93	94	-	Winner

== Ratings ==
In the ratings below, the highest rating for the show will in be red, and the lowest rating for the show will be in blue. (Note: Individual corner ratings do not include commercial time, which regular ratings include.)

Episode #	Original Airdate	TNmS Ratings	AGB Ratings	
Episode #	Original Airdate	Nationwide	Nationwide	Seoul National Capital Area
1	November 18, 2012	15.4%	14.0%	-
2	November 25, 2012	-	12.7%	-
3	December 2, 2012	-	12.6%	-
4	December 9, 2012	19.5%	14.6%	-
5	December 16, 2012	16.2%	13.3%	-
6	December 23, 2012	15.5%	13.4%	-
7	December 30, 2012	15.9%	13.0%	-
8	January 6, 2013	14.6%	14.2%	16.7%
9	January 13, 2013	15.1%	14.0%	16.0%
10	January 20, 2013	-	14.4%	16.8%
11	January 27, 2013	15.0%	14.0%	15.8%
12	February 3, 2013	14.1%	13.3%	14.9%
13	February 10, 2013	10.8%	10.0%	-
14	February 17, 2013	13.9%	12.8%	13.7%
15	February 24, 2013	10.5%	10.9%	<(12.5%)
16	March 3, 2013	10.7%	10.6%	11.9%
17	March 10, 2013	11.3%	11.9%	13.7%
18	March 17, 2013	11.7%	11.6%	13.5%
19	March 24, 2013	10.6%	10.8%	-
20	March 31, 2013	11.0%	11.8%	14.2%
21	April 7, 2013	12.9%	12.5%	14.5%
Special	April 14, 2013	7.4%	7.7%	<(10.9%)
