= Next Episode (EP) =

2021 EP by AKMU

- Digital cover

EP by AKMU
- Released: July 26, 2021
- Recorded: 2021
- Genres: Synth-pop; retrowave; downtempo
- Length: 24:41
- Language: Korean
- Label: YG
- Producer: Lee Chan-hyuk

AKMU chronology
AKMU 'Sailing' Tour Live (2020)	Next Episode (2021)	Love Episode (2024)

Vinyl LP cover

Singles from Next Episode
- 1. "Nakka" Released: July 26, 2021

Next Episode (stylized in all caps) is the second extended play (EP) by South Korean brother-sister duo AKMU. It was released digitally on July 26, 2021, and physically on July 27, through YG Entertainment. The EP marks the duo's first album release in nearly two years, since Sailing in September 2019. Described as a "collaboration album", it comprises seven songs, with each track featuring a different artist. "Nakka" serves as the lead single for the album.

== Background and release ==
South Korean brother-sister duo AKMU released the single "Happening" on November 16, 2020. In a press release for the song member Lee Chan-hyuk hinted that it was a potential prelude to their next full-length album. On June 27, 2021, South Korean news outlet Hankyung reported that the duo would be making a comeback in July, and had begun filming their new music video. On the same day, their agency YG Entertainment confirmed that they were in the middle of filming a music video for a new track. On July 12, the release of AKMU's new album titled Next Episode was announced for July 26.

On July 14, the EP's track listing was published, confirming a total of seven tracks with seven different featured artists. The track list highlighted "Nakka" (낙하) featuring IU as the title track; other featuring artists included Lee Sun-hee, Zion.T, Beenzino, Choi Jung-hoon, Crush, and Sam Kim. Two days later, a video trailer for the EP was released, with YG Entertainment announcing that each track on the album would be accompanied by its own music video.

== Critical reception ==
Professional ratings
Review scores
Source	Rating
IZM	4/5 stars
NME	5/5 stars

Ruby C from the British magazine NME gave the EP a five-star rating out of five, and said, "Much like a mountainous expedition, there are always risks that come with collaborating with others, but those in 'Next Episode' work for the better: each track brings out the strengths of the collaborators, while still effective in showcasing Su-hyun's flawless, pristine vocals and Chan-hyuk's adept lyrical storytelling." Tamar Herman, writing for South China Morning Post, said that "[b]etween the captivating musicality and the lyrics' compelling themes", the album is "worth listening to again and again."

== Commercial performance ==
EP's lead single "Nakka" debuted at number three on Gaon Digital Chart for the week ending July 31, 2021. The following week, "Nakka" rose to the number one spot, becoming the duo's seventh number one single on the chart. It debuted at number 16 on the Billboard's K-pop 100, and peaked at number one for the chart issued on August 14; and remained atop for four consecutive weeks.

== Accolades ==
Awards and nominations received by Next Episode
Year	Awards	Category	Nominee	Result	Ref.
2021	13th Melon Music Awards	Album of the Year	Next Episode	Nominated	
2021	23rd Mnet Asian Music Awards	Song of the Year	"Nakka" (with IU)	Longlisted	
2021	23rd Mnet Asian Music Awards	Best Collaborations	"Nakka" (with IU)	Won	
2021	23rd Mnet Asian Music Awards	Best Vocal Performance	"Nakka" (with IU)	Nominated	
2022	11th Gaon Chart Music Awards	Song of the Year – July	"Nakka" (with IU)	Nominated	
2022	11th Gaon Chart Music Awards	Song of the Year – July	"Hey Kid, Close Your Eyes"	Nominated	

Next Episode on year-end lists
Critic/Publication	List	Work	Rank	Ref.
PopMatters	Top 20 Best K-pop Albums of 2021	Next Episode	4	

== Track listing ==
All lyrics are written by Lee Chan-hyuk, except where noted.

Next Episode track listing
No.	Title	Lyrics	Music	Arrangement	Length
1.	"Hey Kid, Close Your Eyes" (전쟁터; with Lee Sun-hee)		Lee Chan-hyuk; Millennium; Sihwang	Millennium; Sihwang	3:53
2.	"Nakka" (낙하; with IU)		Lee Chan-hyuk; Millennium	Millennium	3:32
3.	"Bench" (with Zion.T)		Lee Chan-hyuk; Lee Hyun-young; Millennium	Lee Hyun-young; Millennium	3:45
4.	"Tictoc Tictoc Tictoc" (째깍 째깍 째깍; with Beenzino)	Lee Chan-hyuk; Beenzino	Lee Chan-hyuk; Peejay	Peejay	3:56
5.	"Next Episode" (맞짱; with Choi Jung-hoon)		Lee Chan-hyuk; Lee Hyun-young	Lee Hyun-young	3:12
6.	"Stupid Love Song" (with Crush)		Lee Chan-hyuk; Jukjae	Jukjae	3:08
7.	"Everest" (with Sam Kim)		Lee Chan-hyuk; Jukjae	Jukjae	3:15
Total length:					24:41

== Credits and personnel ==
Credits adapted from YG Select.

- AKMU – vocals (all tracks)
  - Lee Chan-hyuk – vocals (1, 2, 3, 4, 5), lyrics (all tracks), composition (all tracks)
  - Lee Su-hyun – vocals (1, 2, 4, 6, 7)
- Beenzino – vocals (4), lyrics (4), chorus (4)
- Koo Bon-am – bass (3, 5)
- Crush – vocals (6)
- Lim Heon-il – acoustic guitar (5), electric guitar (5)
- Lee Hyun-young – composition (3, 5), arrangement (3, 5), keyboard (3, 5), synthesizer (3, 5)
- IU – vocals (2)
- Park Jae-bum – drum (5), percussion (5)
- Park Jong-woo (PJnotreble) – bass (4)
- Jukjae – composition (6, 7), arrangement (6, 7), acoustic guitar (6, 7), electric guitar (6, 7), bass (6, 7), drum (6, 7)
- Yoon Jun-hyun - synthesizer (7)
- Choi Jung-hoon – vocals (5)
- Millennium – composition (1, 2, 3), arrangement (1, 2, 3), drum (1, 2, 3), synthesizer (1, 2), programming (1), sampling and editing (1), bass (2), keyboard (2), effects (2, 3), percussion (3)
- Peejay – composition (4), arrangement (4), drum (4), keyboard (4), percussion (4), chorus (4)
- Sam Kim – vocals (7)
- Kim Seung-hyun (Shyun) – electric guitar (4)
- Sihwang – composition (1), arrangement (1), electric guitar (1), electric bass (1), synthesizer (1)
- Chung Soo-wan – electric guitar (3)
- Lee Sun-hee – vocals (1)
- Zion.T – vocals (3)

== Charts ==
Chart performance for Next Episode
Chart (2021)	Peak position
South Korean Albums (Gaon)	6

Monthly chart performance for Next Episode
Chart (2021)	Peak position
South Korean Albums (Gaon)	43

== Sales ==
Sales for Next Episode
Region	Sales
South Korea (Gaon) (Note: Sales figure as of July 2021.)	11,552

== Release history ==
Release dates and formats for Next Episode
Region	Date	Format(s)	Label	Ref.
Various	July 26, 2021	Digital download; streaming	YG	
South Korea	July 27, 2021	CD	YG; YG Plus	
South Korea	November 29, 2021	LP	YG; YG Plus	
