= Babymonster discography =

South Korean girl group discography

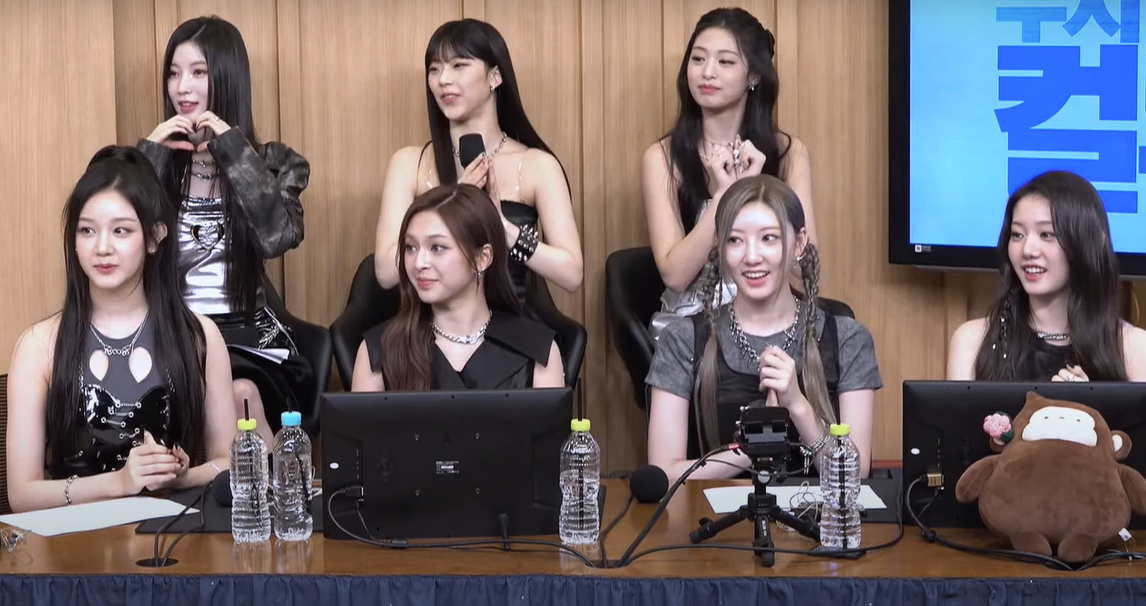
- Babymonster in 2024; L–R, back: Asa, Ruka, Ahyeon; L–R, front: Pharita, Chiquita, Rami, Rora
- Studio albums: 1
- EPs: 3
- Live albums: 2
- Singles: 10
- Music videos: 19
- Promotional singles: 2
- Soundtrack appearances: 1

The South Korean girl group Babymonster have released one studio album, two live albums, three extended plays, ten singles, and two promotional singles. They were formed under YG Entertainment following the airing of the reality show Last Evaluation in 2023.

Their official debut came on April 1, 2024, with the extended play (EP) Babymons7er and its titular single, "Sheesh". In the first eight months of their career, the group surpassed a cumulative sales figure of 1.53 million copies across two releases, both of which later achieved platinum certification from the Korea Music Content Association (KMCA).

Babymonster released their first original Japanese single "Ghost" on May 7, 2025, which served as a soundtrack for the Japanese film, Mieruko-chan.

== Albums ==
=== Studio albums ===
List of studio albums, showing selected details, selected chart positions, sales figures, and certifications
| Title | Details | Peak chart positions | | | | | Sales | Certifications |
| Title | Details | KOR | JPN | JPN Hot | UK DL | US | Sales | Certifications |
|---|---|---|---|---|---|---|---|---|
| Drip | Released: November 1, 2024; Label: YG Entertainment; Formats: CD, digital download | 1 | 9 | 7 | 84 | 149 | KOR: 1,060,937; JPN: 29,044 (Note: Sales figures for Drip: Physical sales: 28,189; Digital sales: 855) | KMCA: Platinum; KMCA: 2× Platinum (Nemo) |

=== Live albums ===
List of live albums, showing selected details, selected chart positions, and sales figures
| Title | Details | Peak chart positions | | Sales |
| Title | Details | JPN | JPN DL | Sales |
|---|---|---|---|---|
| 2025 Babymonster 1st World Tour 'Hello Monsters' in Japan | Released: September 14, 2025; Label: YG Entertainment; Formats: CD, digital download, streaming | 29 | 78 | JPN: 1,496 |
| Babymonster 'Love Monsters' Japan Fan Concert 2025 | Released: March 25, 2026; Label: YG Entertainment, Sony; Formats: CD, digital download, streaming | 39 | — | JPN: 1,837 |

== Extended plays ==
List of extended plays, showing selected details, selected chart positions, sales figures, and certifications
| Title | Details | Peak chart positions | | | | | | | | Sales | Certifications |
| Title | Details | KOR | BEL | CRO | GER | JPN | NGA | UK DL | US World | Sales | Certifications |
|---|---|---|---|---|---|---|---|---|---|---|---|
| Babymons7er | Released: April 1, 2024; Label: YG Entertainment; Formats: CD, digital download | 3 | — | 5 | — | 6 | 98 | 69 | 15 | KOR: 848,846; JPN: 25,517 (Note: Sales figures for Babymons7er: Physical sales: 24,689; Digital sales: 828) | KMCA: Platinum; KMCA: 2× Platinum (Nemo) |
| We Go Up | Released: October 10, 2025; Label: YG Entertainment; Formats: CD, digital download | 1 | 43 | — | 93 | 4 | — | — | — (Note: We Go Up did not enter the US World Albums Chart, but peaked at number 13 on the Top Album Sales, and number 41 on the Independent Albums.) | KOR: 758,789; JPN: 80,199 (Note: Sales figures for We Go Up: Physical sales: 79,360; Digital sales: 839) | KMCA: 2× Platinum; RIAJ: Gold (phy. |
| Choom | Released: May 4, 2026; Label: YG Entertainment; Formats: CD, digital download | 3 | 21 | — | 41 | 5 | — | — | 18 | KOR: 839,975; JPN: 20,397 (Note: Sales figures for Choom: Physical sales: 19,639; Digital sales: 758) | KMCA: 2× Platinum; KMCA: Platinum (Nemo) |
"—" denotes releases that did not chart or were not released in that region.

== Singles ==
List of singles, showing year released, selected chart positions, sales figures, certifications, and name of the album
| Title | Year | Peak chart positions | | | | | | | | | | Sales | Certifications | Album |
| Title | Year | KOR | HK | IDN Songs | JPN Hot | MLY Songs | NZ Hot | SGP | TWN | US World | WW | Sales | Certifications | Album |
|---|---|---|---|---|---|---|---|---|---|---|---|---|---|---|
| "Batter Up" (Note: Single initially released as a six-piece; cited as the group's pre-debut material. A seven-member version was included in Babymons7er.) | 2023 | 123 | 22 | 14 | 100 | 9 | 14 | 10 | 7 | 5 | 101 | US: 1,000 | | Babymons7er |
| "Stuck in the Middle" | 2024 | — (Note: "Stuck in the Middle" did not enter the Circle Digital Chart, but peaked at number 45 on the component download chart.) | — | — | — | — | — | — | — | — | — | | | Babymons7er |
| "Sheesh" | 2024 | 10 | 10 | 4 | 42 | 4 | 30 | 6 | 3 | — | 33 | | RIAJ: Platinum | Babymons7er |
| "Forever" | 2024 | 101 | 16 | 20 | 92 | 7 | — | 12 | 6 | 7 | 141 | | | Drip |
| "Drip" | 2024 | 10 | 2 | 10 | 26 | 3 | 10 | 7 | 2 | — | 30 | JPN: 2,324 | RIAJ: Platinum | Drip |
| "Hot Sauce" | 2025 | 109 | — | — | 41 | — | — | — (Note: "Hot Sauce" did not enter the Official Singapore Chart, but peaked at number 15 on the Regional Chart.) | 11 | — | — | | | Non-album single |
| "We Go Up" | 2025 | 91 | 13 | — | 58 | 13 | 24 | 19 | 7 | 6 | 121 | | | We Go Up |
| "Choom" (춤) | 2026 | 84 | 7 | — | 33 | 17 | 19 | 5 | 1 | 9 | — (Note: "Choom" did not enter the Billboard Global 200, but peaked at number 110 on the Global Excl. US.) | JPN: 1,053 | | Choom |
| "Sugar Honey Ice Tea" | 2026 | 153 | — | — | 29 | — | — | — (Note: "Sugar Honey Ice Tea" did not enter the Official Singapore Chart, but peaked at number 14 on the Regional Chart.) | 12 | — | — | | | Non-album singles |
| "Deserve" | 2026 | 150 | 18 | — | 79 | — | 16 | 12 | 4 | — | — | | | Non-album singles |
"—" denotes releases that did not chart or were not released in that region.

=== Promotional singles ===
List of promotional singles, showing year released, selected chart positions, and name of the album
| Title | Year | Peak chart positions | | | | | Album |
| Title | Year | KOR DL | MLY Songs | SGP Reg. | TWN | WW Excl. US | Album |
|---|---|---|---|---|---|---|---|
| "Dream" | 2023 | 92 | — | — | — | — | Babymons7er |
| "Clik Clak" | 2024 | 31 | 18 | 18 | 19 | 135 | Drip |
"—" denotes releases that did not chart or were not released in that region.

== Soundtrack appearances ==
List of soundtrack appearances, showing year released, and name of the album
| Title | Year | Album |
|---|---|---|
| "Ghost" | 2025 | Mieruko-chan OST |

== Other charted songs ==
List of other charted songs, showing year released, selected chart positions, and name of the album
| Title | Year | Peak chart positions | | | | | | Album |
| Title | Year | KOR | HK | JPN Heat. | SGP Reg. | TWN | WW Excl. US | Album |
|---|---|---|---|---|---|---|---|---|
| "Monsters (Intro)" | 2024 | — (Note: "Monsters (Intro)" did not enter the Circle Digital Chart, but peaked at number 113 on the component download chart.) | — | — | — | — | — | Babymons7er |
| "Like That" | 2024 | — (Note: "Like That" did not enter the Circle Digital Chart, but peaked at number 64 on the component download chart.) | — | 7 | 17 | 16 | 186 | Babymons7er |
| "Love, Maybe" | 2024 | — (Note: "Love, Maybe" did not enter the Circle Digital Chart, but peaked at number 125 on the component download chart.) | — | — | — | — | — | Drip |
| "Really Like You" | 2024 | 79 | — | — | — | — | — | Drip |
| "Billionaire" | 2024 | — (Note: "Billionaire" did not enter the Circle Digital Chart, but peaked at number 126 on the component download chart.) | — | — | — | — | — | Drip |
| "Love in My Heart" | 2024 | — (Note: "Love in My Heart" did not enter the Circle Digital Chart, but peaked at number 106 on the component download chart.) | — | — | — | — | — | Drip |
| "Woke Up in Tokyo" | 2024 | — (Note: "Woke Up in Tokyo" did not enter the Circle Digital Chart, but peaked at number 142 on the component download chart.) | — | — | — | — | — | Drip |
| "Batter Up" (remix)" | 2024 | — (Note: "Batter Up" (remix)" did not enter the Circle Digital Chart, but peaked at number 145 on the component download chart.) | — | — | — | — | — | Drip |
| "Psycho" | 2025 | — (Note: "Psycho" did not enter the Circle Digital Chart, but peaked at number 59 on the component download chart.) | 22 | — | 30 | 11 | — | We Go Up |
| "Supa Dupa Luv" | 2025 | — (Note: "Supa Dupa Luv" did not enter the Circle Digital Chart, but peaked at number 72 on the component download chart.) | — | — | — | — | — | We Go Up |
| "Wild" | 2025 | — (Note: "Wild" did not enter the Circle Digital Chart, but peaked at number 67 on the component download chart.) | — | — | — | — | — | We Go Up |
| "Moon" | 2026 | — (Note: "Moon" did not enter the Circle Digital Chart, but peaked at number 25 on the component download chart.) | — | — | — | — | — | Choom |
| "I Like It" | 2026 | — (Note: "I Like It" did not enter the Circle Digital Chart, but peaked at number 22 on the component download chart.) | — | — | — | — | — | Choom |
| "Locked In" | 2026 | — (Note: "Locked In" did not enter the Circle Digital Chart, but peaked at number 38 on the component download chart.) | — | — | — | — | — | Choom |
"—" denotes releases that did not chart or were not released in that region.

== Videography ==
=== Music videos ===
List of music videos, showing year released and name of the directors
| Year | Title | Director(s) | Ref. |
|---|---|---|---|
| 2023 | "Dream" | Unknown | |
| 2023 | "Batter Up" | Seo Hyun-seung (Gigant) | |
| 2024 | "Stuck in the Middle" | Jason Kim (Flipevil) | |
| 2024 | "Sheesh" | Seo Hyun-seung (Gigant) | |
| 2024 | "Forever" | Samson (Highqualityfish) | |
| 2024 | "Clik Clak" | Yang Soonsik (YSS Studio) | |
| 2024 | "Drip" | Samson (Highqualityfish) | |
| 2024 | "Love in My Heart" | Yang Soonsik (YSS Studio) | |
| 2025 | "Really Like You" | Jason Kim (Flipevil) | |
| 2025 | "Hot Sauce" | Yang Soonsik (YSS Studio) | |
| 2025 | "We Go Up" | Yang Soonsik (YSS Studio) | |
| 2025 | "Psycho" | Samson (Highqualityfish) | |
| 2025 | "Supa Dupa Luv" | Soze (Studio Gaze) | |
| 2026 | "Choom" | Hangyeol Lee (Hanbago) | |
| 2026 | "Sugar Honey Ice Tea" | Samson (Highqualityfish) | |
| 2026 | "I Like It" | Hangyeol Lee (Hanbago) | |
| 2026 | "Moon" | Samson (Highqualityfish) | |
| 2026 | "Deserve" | Samson (Highqualityfish) | |

=== Other videos ===
List of other videos, showing year released and name of the directors
| Year | Title | Director(s) | Ref. |
|---|---|---|---|
| 2024 | "Like That" (Exclusive Performance Video) | Jason Kim | |
| 2025 | "Billionaire" (Exclusive Performance Video) | Unknown | |
| 2025 | "We Go Up" (Exclusive Performance Video) | Hangyeol Lee (Hanbago) | |
