= YG Entertainment discography =

This is a list of albums released under YG Entertainment.

== 1990s ==
=== 1996 ===
- Keep Six – Six in tha Chamber

=== 1997 ===
- Jinusean – Jinusean

=== 1998 ===
- Jinusean – The Real
- YG – Yang Hyun Suk
- 1TYM – One Time For Your Mind

=== 1999 ===
- Jinusean – 2nd Shot
- YG Family – Famillenium
- YG Family – Y.G. Best of Album

== 2000s ==
=== 2000 ===
- 1TYM – 2nd Round

=== 2001 ===
- Jinusean – The Reign
- Perry – Perry by Storm
- 1TYM – Third Time Fo' Yo' Mind

=== 2002 ===
- Swi.T – Song Will Tell
- Wheesung – Like a Movie
- YG Family – Why Be Normal?

=== 2003 ===
- Gummy – Like Them
- Big Mama – Like the Bible
- SE7EN – Just Listen
- Masta Wu – Masta Peace
- Stony Skunk – 1st Best Seller
- Wheesung – It's Real
- Lexy – Lexury
- 1TYM – Once N 4 All
- YG Family – Color of the Soul Train Live Concert

=== 2004 ===
- XO – Extra Ordinary
- Wanted – Like the First
- Taebin – Taebin of 1TYM
- SE7EN – Must Listen
- Gummy – It's Different
- Wheesung – For the Moment
- Jinusean – Norabosae

=== 2005 ===
- 45RPM – Old Rookie
- Big Mama – It's Unique
- Soulstar – Soulstar
- Stony Skunk – Ragga Muffin
- Lexy – Lextacy
- Gummy – For the Bloom
- Wheesung – Love... Love...? Love...!
- Big Mama – Gift
- 1TYM – One Way

=== 2006 ===
- SE7EN – Must Listen (China)
- SE7EN – 24/7
- SE7EN – First SE7EN
- Gummy – Unplugged
- SE7EN – 24/7 (Repackage)
- Stony Skunk – Skunk Riddum
- Big Mama – For the People
- YG Family – YG 10th
- SE7EN – Se7olution
- BigBang – Big Bang Vol. 1

=== 2007 ===
Released	Title	Artist	Type	Format	Language
February 8	First Live Concert: The Real	BigBang	Live album	CD, download	Korean
March 22	Mass Wu Pt. 2	Masta Wu	EP (Mini album)	CD, download	Korean
April 19	Rush	Lexy	Studio album	CD, download	Korean
May 11	Rain	Kim Ji-eun	Studio album	CD, download	Korean
July 3	747 Live Concert	SE7EN	Live album	DVD	Korean
August 16	Always	BigBang	EP (Mini album)	CD, download	Korean
September 4	More Fyah	Stony Skunk	Studio album	CD, download	Korean
November 22	Hot Issue	BigBang	EP (Mini album)	CD, download	Korean

=== 2008 ===
Released	Title	Artist	Type	Format	Language
January 4	For the World	BigBang	EP (Mini album)	CD, download	Japanese
February 13	Hit-pop	45RPM	Studio album	CD, download	Korean
February 29	Second Live Concert: The Great	BigBang	Live album	CD, download	Korean
March 12	Comfort	Gummy	Studio album	CD, download	Korean
May 22	Hot	Taeyang	EP (Mini album)	CD, download	Korean
May 28	With U	BigBang	EP (Mini album)	CD, download	Japanese
July 1	D.I.S.C.O	Uhm Jung-hwa	EP (Mini album)	CD, download	Korean
August 8	Stand Up	BigBang	EP (Mini album)	CD, download	Korean
October 10	Made in R.O.K	YMGA	EP (Mini album)	CD, download	Korean
October 22	Number 1	BigBang	Studio album	CD, download	Japanese
November 5	Remember	BigBang	Studio album	CD, download	Korean

=== 2009 ===
Released	Title	Artist	Type	Format	Language
April 22	2009 Big Show	BigBang	Live album	CD, download	Korean
July 8	2NE1 1st Mini Album	2NE1	EP (Mini album)	CD, download	Korean
August 18	Heartbreaker	G-Dragon	Studio album	CD, download	Korean
August 19	Big Bang	BigBang	Studio album	CD, download	Japanese
August 19	Asia Best 2006-2009	BigBang	Compilation album	CD, download	Japanese

== 2010s ==
=== 2010 ===
Released	Title	Artist	Type	Format	Language
February 19	Lollipop, Part 2	BigBang	Single	download	Korean
March 30	Shine a Light	G-Dragon	Live album	DVD	Korean
May 11	"The Shouts of Red, Part 2"	BigBang	Single	download	Korean
June 9	"Tell Me Goodbye"	BigBang	Single	CD Single, CD + DVD, download	Japanese
June 23	2010 Big Show	BigBang	Live album	DVD	Japanese
July 1	Solar	Taeyang	Studio album	CD, download	Korean
July 21	Digital Bounce	SE7EN	EP (Mini album)	CD, download	Korean
August 25	Solar (International)	Taeyang	Studio album	CD, download	Korean
August 25	"Beautiful Hangover"	BigBang	Single	CD, download	Japanese, English
September 9	To Anyone	2NE1	Studio album	CD, download	Korean
September 29	"I'm Going Crazy"	SE7EN	Single	download	Korean
October 11	"In My Eyes"	PSY	Single	download	Korean
October 14	"Thank You"	PSY	Single	download	Korean
October 20	PsyFive	PSY	Studio album	CD, download	Korean
December 24	The First Album	GD & TOP	Studio album	CD, download	Korean

=== 2011 ===
Released	Title	Artist	Type	Format	Language
January 20	V.V.I.P	Seungri	EP (Mini album)	CD, download	Korean
February 24	Tonight	BigBang	EP (Mini album)	CD, download	Korean
April 8	BIGBANG Special Edition	BigBang	Studio album	CD, download	Korean
April 21	"Don't Cry"	Park Bom	Single	download	Korean
April 29	Loveless	Gummy	EP (Mini album)	CD, download	Japanese
May 11	Big Bang 2	BigBang	Studio album	CD Single, CD + DVD, download	Japanese
May 12	"Lonely"	2NE1	Single	download	Korean
June 14	2011 Big Show	BigBang	Live album	DVD	Korean
June 24	"I Am the Best"	2NE1	Single	download	Korean
July 28	2NE1 2nd Mini Album	2NE1	EP (Mini album)	CD, download	Korean
September 21	Nolza	2NE1	EP (Mini album)	CD Single, CD + DVD, download	Japanese
September 28	Love & Hope Tour 2011	BigBang	Live album	DVD	Japanese
October 14	"Airbag"	Tablo	Single	download	Korean
October 21	Fever's End: Part 1	Tablo	EP (Mini album)	CD, download	Korean
November 1	Fever's End: Part 2	Tablo	EP (Mini album)	CD, download	Korean
November 16	"Go Away"(Japanese version)	2NE1	Single	download	Japanese
November 23	2011 1st Live Concert NOLZA!	2NE1	Live album	DVD	Korean
December 14	The Best Of BIGBANG	BigBang	Compilation album	CD + DVD	Japanese

=== 2012 ===
Released	Title	Artist	Type	Format	Language
February 1	SE7EN New Mini album	SE7EN	EP (Mini album)	CD, download	Korean
February 29	Alive (EP)	BigBang	EP (Mini album)	CD, download	Korean
March 28	Alive	BigBang	Studio album	CD Single, CD + DVD, download	Japanese
March 28	Scream	2NE1	Single album	download	Japanese
March 28	Collection	2NE1	Studio album	CD Single, CD + DVD, download	Japanese
April 18	2011 YG Family Concert	YG Family	Live album	DVD	Korean
April 25	"Love Again"	SE7EN	Single	download	Korean
May 8	"Father (At Summer Stand)"	PSY	Single	download	Korean
June 6	Still Alive	BigBang	Studio album	CD, download	Korean
June 20	Alive: Monster Edition	BigBang	Studio album	CD Single, CD + DVD, download	Japanese
June 28	"Korea"	PSY	Single	download	Korean
July 5	"I Love You"	2NE1	Single	download	Korean
July 15	PSY 6 (Six Rules), Part 1	PSY	EP (Mini album)	CD, download	Korean
September 1	"That XX"	G-Dragon	Single	download	Korean
September 5	SE7EN The Best	SE7EN	Compilation album	CD + DVD	Japanese
September 15	One of a Kind	G-Dragon	EP (Mini album)	CD, download	Korean
September 19	"I Love You"	2NE1	Single	CD Single, CD + DVD, download	Japanese
October 9	"It's Cold"	Epik High	Single	download	Korean
October 19	99	Epik High	Studio album	CD, download	Korean
October 29	"1,2,3,4"	Lee Hi	Single	download	Korean
November 22	"Scarecrow"	Lee Hi	Single	download	Korean
December 4	2012 2NE1 Global Tour	2NE1	Live album	DVD	Korean
December 5	Special Final in Dome Memorial Collection	BigBang	EP (Mini album)	CD Single, CD + DVD, download	Japanese

=== 2013 ===
Released	Title	Artist	Type	Format	Language
January 10	2012 BIGBANG Live Concert – Alive Tour in Seoul	BigBang	Live album	DVD	Korean
February 27	D'scover	Daesung	Studio album	CD Single, CD + DVD, download	Japanese
March 20	"Thank You"	SE7EN	Single	download	Japanese
March 28	First Love	Lee Hi	Studio album	CD, download	Korean
April 1	MichiGO	G-Dragon	Single	download	Korean
April 3	Fate(s)	Gummy	EP (Mini album)	CD, download	Japanese
April 13	"Gentleman"	PSY	Single	download	Korean
May 28	"The Baddest Female"	CL	Single	download	Korean
May 30	2013 BIGBANG Alive Galaxy Tour – The Final in Seoul	BigBang	Live album	DVD	Korean
July 8	"Falling In Love"	2NE1	Single	download	Korean
July 16	"It Rains"	Kang Seung-yoon	Single	download	Korean
July 31	"I Love You"	Daesung	Single	download	Japanese
July 31	"Wild & Young"	Kang Seung-yoon	Single	download	Korean
August 7	"Do You Love Me"	2NE1	Single	download	Korean
August 13	"Stealer"	Kang Seung-yoon	Single	download	Korean
August 19	Let's Talk About Love	Seungri	EP (Mini album)	CD, download	Korean
September 13	Coup D'Etat	G-Dragon	Studio album	CD, download	Korean
October 9	Let's Talk About Love	Seungri	Studio album	CD Single, CD + DVD, download	Japanese
November 8	"Ringa Linga"	Taeyang	Single	download	Korean
November 15	"Doom Dada"	T.O.P	Single	download	Korean
November 21	"Missing You"	2NE1	Single	download	Korean
November 27	Coup d'Etat + One of a Kind & Heart Breaker	G-Dragon	Studio album	CD Single, CD + DVD, download	Japanese
December 19	"All I Want for Christmas Is You"	Park Bom & Lee Hi	Single	download	Korean

=== 2014 ===
Released	Title	Artist	Type	Format	Language
February 26	Crush	2NE1	Studio album	CD, download	Korean
March 28	2014 BIGBANG+α in Seoul	BigBang	Live album	DVD	Korean
April 7	Play	Akdong Musician	Studio album	CD, download	Korean
May 23	2014 2NE1 World Tour Live CD "All or Nothing in Seoul"	2NE1	Live album	DVD	Korean
June 3	Rise	Taeyang	Studio album	CD, download	Korean
June 8	"Hangover"	PSY	Single	download	Korean
June 11	Rainy Rainy	Daesung	Extended play	CD single, CD + DVD, download	Japanese
June 25	Crush (Japanese Edition)	2NE1	Studio album	CD single, CD + DVD, download	Japanese
July 16	D'slove	Daesung	Studio album	CD single, CD + DVD, download	Japanese
August 12	2014 S/S	Winner	Studio album	CD, download	Korean
August 13	Rise [+ Solar & Hot]	Taeyang	Studio album	CD single, CD + DVD, download	Japanese
September 10	2014 S/S: Japan Collection	Winner	Studio album	CD single, CD + DVD, download	Japanese
October 14	"Time and Fallen Leaves"	Akdong Musician	Single	download	Korean
October 21	Shoebox	Epik High	Studio album	CD, download	Korean
October 29	"Delight"	Daesung	Single	CD single, CD + DVD, download	Japanese
November 11	"I'm Different"	Hi Suhyun	Single	download	Korean
November 21	"Good Boy"	G-Dragon & Taeyang	Single	download	Korean
November 26	The Best of BIGBANG 2006-2014	BigBang	Compilation album	CD + DVD	Japanese
November 28	2014 YG Family Concert in Seoul	YG Family	Live album	DVD	Korean
December 2	"Come Here"	Masta Wu	Single	download	Korean

=== 2015 ===
Released	Title	Artist	Type	Format	Language
April 15	"Tell Me One More Time"	Jinusean	Single	download	Korean
May 1	M	BigBang	Single album	CD, download	Korean
June 1	A	BigBang	Single album	CD, download	Korean
July 1	D	BigBang	Single album	CD, download	Korean
August 5	E	BigBang	Single album	CD, download	Korean
September 5	"Hood"	Tablo & Joey Bada$$	Single	download	Korean
September 15	"My Type"	iKon	Single	download	Korean
October 15	"Like Ga, Na, Da" (Korea Hangul Day Celebration)	Akdong Musician	Single	download	Korean
October 21	"Parachute"^{3}	Code Kunst	Single	download	Korean
November 21	"Hello Bi+ches"	CL	Single	download	Korean, English
December 1	Chiljip Psy-da	PSY	Studio album	CD, download	Korean, English
December 24	Welcome Back	iKon	Studio album	CD, download	Korean

=== 2016 ===
Released	Title	Artist	Type	Format	Language
January 13	Welcome Back	iKon	Studio album	CD single, CD + DVD, download	Japanese
February 1	Exit : E	Winner	Extended play	CD, download	Korean
February 3	Made Series	BigBang	Studio album	CD, download	Japanese
April 20	Seoulite	Lee Hi	Studio album	CD, download	Korean
May 4	Spring	Akdong Musician	Extended play	CD, download	Korean
May 29	"#WYD"	iKon	Single	Download	Korean
August 1	2016 Winner Exit Tour In Seoul Live CD	Winner	Live album	CD, download	Korean
August 8	Square One	Blackpink	Single album	Download	Korean
August 19	"Lifted"	CL	Single	Download	English
September 9	The MOBB	MOBB	Extended play	CD, download	Korean
October 7	"Three Words"	Sechs Kies	Single	download	Korean
November 1	Square Two	Blackpink	Single album	download	Korean
December 1	2016 Re-ALBUM	Sechs Kies	Studio album	CD, download	Korean
December 12	Made	BigBang	Studio album	CD, download	Korean

=== 2017 ===
Released	Title	Artist	Type	Format	Language
January 3	Winter	Akdong Musician	Studio album	CD, download	Korean
January 21	"Goodbye"	2NE1	Single	download	Korean
February 1	OO (Note: Released through independent sub-label The Black Label.)	Zion.T	Extended play	CD, download	Korean
February 28	Muggles' Mansion^{3}	Code Kunst	Studio album	CD, download	Korean
April 4	Fate Number For	Winner	Single album	CD, download	Korean
April 24	23^{3}	Hyukoh	Studio album	CD, download	Korean
April 28	The 20th Anniversary	Sechs Kies	Compilation album	CD, download	Korean
May 10	4X2=8	PSY	Studio album	CD, download	Korean
May 22	New Kids: Begin	iKon	Single album	CD, download	Korean
May 30	Team Baby^{3}	The Black Skirts	Studio album	CD, download	Korean
June 8	Kwon Ji Yong	G-Dragon	Extended play	USB, download	Korean
June 22	"As If It's Your Last"	Blackpink	Single	Download	Korean
July 10	VIDA^{3}	millic	Studio album	CD, download	Korean
July 11	One Day	One	Single album	CD, download	Korean
July 20	Summer Episode	Akdong Musician	Single album	download	Korean
July 24	boy.^{3}	offonoff	Studio album	CD, download	Korean
August 4	Our Twenty For	Winner	Single album	CD, download	Korean
August 8	New Kids: Begin	iKon	Extended play	CD, download	Japanese
August 16	White Night	Taeyang	Studio album	CD, download	Korean
August 30	Blackpink	Blackpink	Extended play	CD, download	Japanese
September 14	Love and Fall	Bobby	Studio album	CD, download	Korean
September 21	Another Light	Sechs Kies	Studio album	CD, download	Korean
October 23	We've Done Something Wonderful	Epik High	Studio album	CD, download	Korean
December 4	"Snow" (Note: Released through independent sub-label The Black Label.)	Zion.T	Single	download	Korean
December 17	Temporary Idols / Part-Time Idol ^{4}	Kim Hee-jung, Hwang Seung-eon, Lee Su-hyun, Kwon Hyun-bin and Kwon Young-deuk	Single album	download	Korean

(Note: Released through independent sub-label The Black Label.) .
^{3} Released through independent sub-label HIGHGRND.
^{4} Special project group.

=== 2018 ===
Released	Title	Artist	Type	Format	Language
January 25	Return	iKon	Studio album	CD, download	Korean
February 7	Our Twenty For	Winner	Studio album	CD, download	Japanese
March 5	"Rubber Band"	iKon	Single	Download	Korean
March 13	"Flower Road"	BigBang	Single	Download	Korean
March 21	Lee Hi Japan Debut Album	Lee Hi	Studio album	CD, download	Japanese
March 28	Re: Blackpink	Blackpink	Extended play	CD, download	Japanese
April 4	Everyday	Winner	Studio Album	CD, download	Korean
June 15	Square Up	Blackpink	Extended play	CD, download	Korean
July 20	The Great Seungri	Seungri	Studio album	CD, download	Korean
August 2	New Kids: Continue	iKon	Extended play	CD, download	Korean
October 1	New Kids: The Final	iKon	Extended play	CD, download	Korean
October 15	ZZZ (Note: Released through independent sub-label The Black Label.)	Zion.T	Extended play	CD, download	Korean
November 12	"Solo"	Jennie	Single	CD, download	Korean
November 26	XX	Mino	Studio album	CD, download	Korean
December 8	Blackpink in Your Area	Blackpink	Studio album	CD, download	Japanese
December 19	"Millions"	Winner	Single	CD, download	Korean

(Note: Released through independent sub-label The Black Label.) .

=== 2019 ===
Released	Title	Artist	Type	Format	Language
January 7	The New Kids	iKon	Compilation album	CD, download	Korean
March 6	"What You Waiting For"^{1, 2}	R.Tee x Anda	Single	Download	Korean
April 5	Kill This Love	Blackpink	Extended play	CD, download	Korean
May 15	We	Winner	Extended play	CD, download	Korean
May 30	24°C	Lee Hi	Extended play	CD, download	Korean
June 13	"Birthday" (Note: Released through independent sub-label The Black Label.)	Somi	Single album	CD, download	Korean
June 27	G1	Eun Ji-won	Studio album	CD, download	Korean
August 7	We	Winner	Extended play	CD, download	Japanese
August 14	Jinu's Heyday	Jinu	Single album	CD, download	Korean
August 19	Dimension^{2}	Viini	Extended play	CD, download	Korean
September 17	Collection^{2}	Zayvo	Extended play	CD, download	Korean
September 25	Sailing	AKMU	Studio album	CD, download	Korean
October 2	"Mennal" (Note: Released through independent sub-label The Black Label.)	Vince	Single	Download	Korean
October 16	Kill This Love	Blackpink	Extended play	CD, download	Japanese
October 23	Cross	Winner	Extended play	CD, download	Korean
November 6	"May" (Note: Released through independent sub-label The Black Label.)	Zion.T	Single	Download	Korean
December 2	"Nobody"^{2}	Blue.D	Single	Download	Korean

(Note: Released through independent sub-label The Black Label.) Released through independent sub-label The Black Label.
^{2} Released through independent sub-label YGX Entertainment.

== 2020s ==
=== 2020 ===
Released	Title	Artist	Type	Format	Language
January 28	All for You	Sechs Kies	Extended play	CD, download	Korean
February 4	"Emergency" (Note: Released through independent sub-label The Black Label.)	Vince	Single	Download	Korean
February 6	I Decide	iKon	Extended play	CD, download	Korean
March 4	Moon & Butterfly^{2}	Viini	Single album	CD, download	Korean
March 26	"Hold"	Winner	Pre-release single	Download	Korean
April 9	Remember	Winner	Studio album	CD, download	Korean
June 5	"Wayo"	Bang Ye-dam	Single	Download	Korean
June 26	"How You Like That"	Blackpink	Pre-release single	CD, download	Korean
July 22	"What You Waiting For" (Note: Released through independent sub-label The Black Label.)	Somi	Single	Download	Korean
August 7	The First Step: Chapter One	Treasure	Single album	CD, download	Korean
August 28	"Ice Cream"	Blackpink and Selena Gomez	Pre-release single	Download	Korean
September 18	The First Step: Chapter Two	Treasure	Single album	CD, download	Korean
October 2	The Album	Blackpink	Studio album	CD, download	Korean
October 16	"Alien"	Lee Su-hyun	Single	Download	Korean
October 30	Take	Mino	Studio album	CD, download	Korean
November 6	The First Step: Chapter Three	Treasure	Single album	CD, download	Korean
November 13	"Empty Trash" (Note: Released through independent sub-label The Black Label.)	Løren	Single	Download	Korean
November 16	"Happening"	AKMU	Single	Download	Korean

(Note: Released through independent sub-label The Black Label.) Released through independent sub-label The Black Label.
^{2} Released through independent sub-label YGX Entertainment.

=== 2021 ===
Released	Title	Artist	Type	Format	Language
January 11	The First Step: Treasure Effect	Treasure	Studio album	CD, download	Korean
January 25	Lucky Man	Bobby	Studio album	CD, download	Korean
February 5	"Don't Look Back"	Sechs Kies	Single	Download	Korean
March 3	"Why Why Why"	iKon	Single	Download	Korean
March 12	R	Rosé	Single album	CD, download	English
March 28	Letter	Viini	Single	Download	Korean
March 29	Page	Kang Seung-yoon	Studio album	CD, download	Korean
March 31	The First Step: Treasure Effect	Treasure	Studio album	CD, download	Japanese
July 26	Next Episode	AKMU	Extended play	CD, download	Korean
July 29	"Need (ooo-eee)" (Note: Released through independent sub-label The Black Label.)	Løren	Single	Download	Korean
August 2	"Dumb Dumb"^{2}	Somi	Single	Download	Korean
August 3	The Album	Blackpink	Studio album	CD, download	Japanese
September 10	Lalisa	Lisa	Single album	CD, download	Korean
October 29	XOXO^{2}	Somi	Studio album	CD, download	Korean
November 25	"All My Friends Are Turning Blue" (Note: Released through independent sub-label The Black Label.)	Løren	Single	Download	Korean
December 7	To Infinity.	Mino	Studio album	CD, download	Korean
December 23	"A Gift!" (Note: Released through independent sub-label The Black Label.)	Zion.T	Single	Download	Korean

(Note: Released through independent sub-label The Black Label.) Released through independent sub-label Fire Exit Records.
^{2} .

=== 2022 ===
Released	Title	Artist	Type	Format	Language
February 15	The Second Step: Chapter One	Treasure	Extended play	CD, download	Korean
March 14	"Born to Love You"	Kang Seung-yoon	Single	Download	Korean
March 31	The Second Step: Chapter One	Treasure	Extended play	CD, download	Japanese
April 5	"Still Life"	BigBang	Single	Download	Korean
May 3	Flashback	iKon	Extended play	CD, download	Korean
July 5	Holiday	Winner	Extended play	CD, download	Korean
July 6	Flashback [+ I Decide]	iKon	Studio album	CD, download	Japanese
August 19	"Pink Venom"	Blackpink	Pre-release single	Download	Korean
September 16	Born Pink	Blackpink	Studio album	CD, download	Korean
October 4	The Second Step: Chapter Two	Treasure	Extended play	CD, download	Korean
October 17	Error	Lee Chan-hyuk	Studio album	Download	Korean

=== 2023 ===
Released	Title	Artist	Type	Format	Language
January 13	"Vibe" (Note: Released through independent sub-label The Black Label.)	Taeyang feat. Jimin of BTS	Pre-release single	Download	Korean
March 24	Put Up a Fight (Note: Released through independent sub-label The Black Label.)	Løren	Extended play	CD, download	Korean
March 31	Me	Jisoo	Single album	CD, download	Korean
April 25	Down to Earth (Note: Released through independent sub-label The Black Label.)	Taeyang	Extended play	CD, download	Korean
June 28	2U (Note: Released through independent sub-label The Black Label.)	Bryan Chase	Extended play	Download	English
June 28	"Move"	Treasure (T5)	Pre-release single	Download	Korean
July 28	Reboot	Treasure	Studio album	CD, download	Korean
August 7	Game Plan (Note: Released through independent sub-label The Black Label.)	Somi	Extended play	CD, download	Korean
August 21	Love Lee	AKMU	Single album	Download	Korean
August 25	"The Girls"	Blackpink	Single	Download	English
October 6	"You & Me"	Jennie	Single	Download	English
November 17	The Drive	Vince	Extended play	Download	Korean
November 27	"Batter Up"	Babymonster	Single	Download	Korean
December 6	Zip	Zion.T	Studio album	CD, download	Korean
December 12	"Ex-Mas"	Somi x Big Naughty	Single	Download	Korean
December 13	"Eat Sleep Live Repeat"	Lee Sung-kyung, Lee Chan-hyuk	Single	Download	Korean

=== 2024 ===
Released	Title	Artist	Type	Format	Language
January 1	"1 Trillion"	Lee Chan-hyuk	Single	Download	Korean
February 1	"Stuck in the Middle"	Babymonster	Pre-release Single	Download	English
February 21	Reboot (JP Special Selection)	Treasure	Extended play	CD, download	Japanese
April 1	Babymons7er	Babymonster	Extended play	CD, download	Korean
May 28	"King Kong"	Treasure	Single	Download	Korean
June 3	Love Episode	AKMU	Extended play	CD, download	Korean
July 1	"Forever"	Babymonster	Single	Download	Korean
July 15	My Type	Lee Seung-hoon	Extended play	CD, download	Korean
November 1	Drip	Babymonster	Studio album	CD, download	Korean, English

=== 2025 ===
Released	Title	Artist	Type	Format	Language
March 7	Pleasure	Treasure	Extended play	Download, CD	Korean
July 1	"Hot Sauce"	Babymonster	Single	Download	Korean
July 11	"Jump"	Blackpink	Single	Download	Korean
July 14	Eros	Lee Chan-hyuk	Studio album	Download, CD	Korean
September 1	Love Pulse	Treasure	Extended play	Download, CD	Korean
October 10	We Go Up	Babymonster	Extended play	Download, CD	Korean

=== 2026 ===
Released	Title	Artist	Type	Format	Language
February 26	Deadline	Blackpink	Extended play	Download, CD	Korean
May 4	Choom	Babymonster	Extended play	Download, CD	Korean
June 1	New Wav	Treasure	Extended play	Download, CD	Korean
June 8	"Sugar Honey Ice Tea"	Babymonster	Single	Download	Korean
