= List of awards and nominations received by Babymonster =

Babymonster awards and nominations
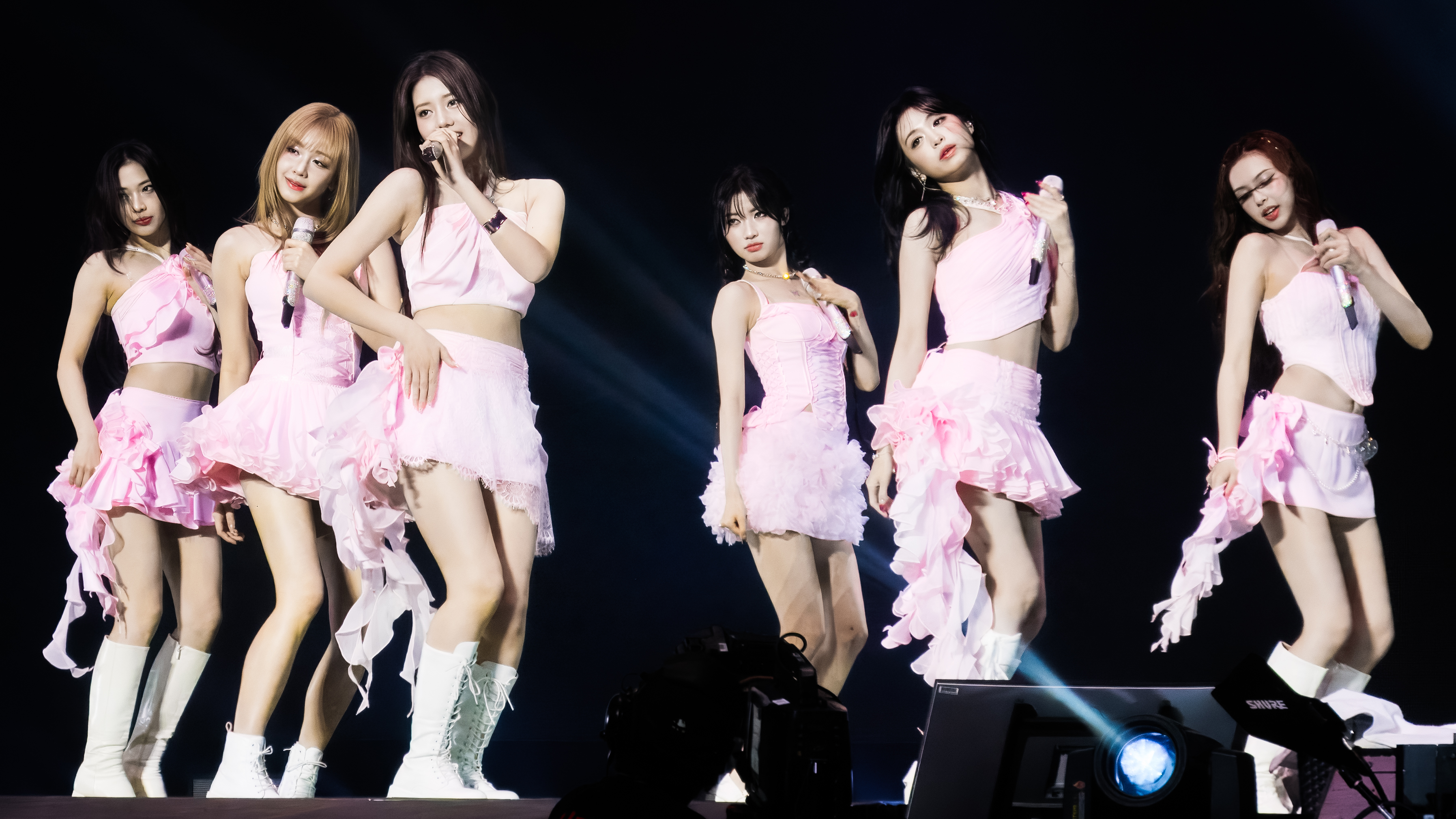
- Babymonster in 2025
Awards and nominations
Award	Wins	Nominations
Asia Artist Awards	0	3
Asian Pop Music Awards	2	4
Asia Star Entertainer Awards	0	6
Brand Customer Loyalty Awards	0	1
Brand of the Year Awards	1	3
Circle Chart Music Awards	1	3
D Awards	2	3
The Fact Music Awards	0	3
Golden Disc Awards	1	4
Hanteo Music Awards	0	19
iHeartRadio Music Awards	0	1
iMBC Awards	0	1
KM Chart Awards	0	1
Korea First Brand Awards	2	3
Korea Grand Music Awards	0	8
K-World Dream Awards	0	1
MAMA Awards	2	10
Melon Music Awards	0	7
MTV Video Music Awards Japan	0	1
Music Awards Japan	0	6
Seoul Music Awards	1	8

Totals (Note: Certain award groups do not simply award one winner. They acknowledge several different recipients, have runners-up, and have third place. Since this is a specific recognition and is different from losing an award, runner-up mentions are considered wins in this award tally. For simplification and to avoid errors, each award in this list has been presumed to have had a prior nomination.)
- Wins: 13
- Nominations: 99

Babymonster is a South Korean girl group formed through the reality show Last Evaluation (2023) under YG Entertainment. Since their debut, the group has received numerous accolades from music award ceremonies in South Korea and abroad.

The group received their first award at the 13th Circle Chart Music Awards in 2024. They went on to receive additional accolades at the MAMA Awards, Golden Disc Awards, and Seoul Music Awards amongst others.

== Awards and nominations ==
Name of the award ceremony, year presented, category, nominee of the award, and the result of the nomination
Award ceremony	Year	Category	Nominee / work	Result	Ref.
Asia Artist Awards	2024	Popularity Award – Female Singer	Babymonster	Nominated	
Asia Artist Awards	2025	Popularity Award – Female Singer	Babymonster	Nominated	
Asia Artist Awards	2026	Popularity Award – Group (Female)	Babymonster	Pending	
Asian Pop Music Awards	2024	Best New Artist – Overseas	Drip	Won	
Asian Pop Music Awards	2025	Top 20 Songs of the Year	"We Go Up"	Won	
Asian Pop Music Awards	2025	Best Dance Performance	"We Go Up"	Nominated	
Asian Pop Music Awards	2025	Record of the Year	"We Go Up"	Nominated	
Asia Star Entertainer Awards	2025	The Best Group – Female	Babymonster	Nominated	
Asia Star Entertainer Awards	2025	The Best New Artist	Babymonster	Nominated	
Asia Star Entertainer Awards	2025	Fan Choice 5th Generation Award	Babymonster	Nominated	
Asia Star Entertainer Awards	2026	The Best Group – Female	Babymonster	Nominated	
Asia Star Entertainer Awards	2026	Fan Choice 5th Generation Award	Babymonster	Nominated	
Asia Star Entertainer Awards	2026	Fan Choice Artist – Singer	Babymonster	Nominated	
Brand Customer Loyalty Awards (Note: Co-organized by the Korean Customers Council and Brand Keys, this event recognizes the most influential brands in society and culture, as determined through consumer research.)	2026	Female Idol – Hot Trend	Babymonster	Nominated	
Brand of the Year Awards (Note: Established in 2003, Brand of the Year Awards is an awards ceremony based on nationwide surveys hosted by the Korea Consumer Brand Committee and organized by the Korea Consumer Forum.)	2024	Best Female Rookie – Vietnam	Babymonster	Won	
Brand of the Year Awards	2024	Best Female Rookie	Babymonster	Nominated	
Brand of the Year Awards	2025	Female Idol – Hot Trend	Babymonster	Nominated	
Circle Chart Music Awards	2024	Rookie of the Year – Global Streaming	"Batter Up"	Won	
Circle Chart Music Awards	2024	Mubeat Global Choice Award – Female	Babymonster	Nominated	
Circle Chart Music Awards	2024	Rookie of the Year – Streaming Unique Listeners	"Batter Up"	Nominated	
D Awards	2025	Dreams Silver Label	Babymonster	Won	
D Awards	2025	Best Group Popularity Award – Female	Babymonster	Nominated	
D Awards	2026	Best Group Popularity Award – Female	Babymonster	Won	
The Fact Music Awards	2024	Best Music – Winter	"Batter Up"	Nominated	
The Fact Music Awards	2025	Best Music – Winter	"Drip"	Nominated	
The Fact Music Awards	2026	Best Music – Winter	"We Go Up"	Nominated	
Golden Disc Awards	2025	Rookie Artist of the Year	Babymonster	Won	
Golden Disc Awards	2025	Best Album (Bonsang)	Drip	Nominated	
Golden Disc Awards	2025	Best Digital Song (Bonsang)	"Sheesh"	Nominated	
Golden Disc Awards	2025	Most Popular Artist – Female	Babymonster	Nominated	
Hanteo Music Awards	2025	Artist of the Year (Bonsang)	Babymonster	Nominated	
Hanteo Music Awards	2025	Global Artist – Africa	Babymonster	Nominated	
Hanteo Music Awards	2025	Global Artist – Asia	Babymonster	Nominated	
Hanteo Music Awards	2025	Global Artist – Europe	Babymonster	Nominated	
Hanteo Music Awards	2025	Global Artist – North America	Babymonster	Nominated	
Hanteo Music Awards	2025	Global Artist – Oceania	Babymonster	Nominated	
Hanteo Music Awards	2025	Global Artist – South America	Babymonster	Nominated	
Hanteo Music Awards	2025	Rookie of the Year – Female	Babymonster	Nominated	
Hanteo Music Awards	2025	WhosFandom Award – Female	Babymonster	Nominated	
Hanteo Music Awards	2026	Artist of the Year	Babymonster	Nominated	
Hanteo Music Awards	2026	Best Popular Artist	Babymonster	Nominated	
Hanteo Music Awards	2026	Best Continent Artist – Africa	Babymonster	Nominated	
Hanteo Music Awards	2026	Best Continent Artist – Asia	Babymonster	Nominated	
Hanteo Music Awards	2026	Best Continent Artist – Europe	Babymonster	Nominated	
Hanteo Music Awards	2026	Best Continent Artist – North America	Babymonster	Nominated	
Hanteo Music Awards	2026	Best Continent Artist – Oceania	Babymonster	Nominated	
Hanteo Music Awards	2026	Best Continent Artist – South America	Babymonster	Nominated	
Hanteo Music Awards	2026	WhosFandom Award	Babymonster	Nominated	
Hanteo Music Awards	2026	Global Popular Artist	Babymonster	Nominated	
iHeartRadio Music Awards	2025	Best New Artist (K-pop)	Babymonster	Nominated	
iMBC Awards (Note: iMBC Awards, hosted by iMBC Entertainment, MBC Group's only entertainment news outlet, honors artists and actors with outstanding achievements in the industry.)	2025	Best Rookie Award	Babymonster	Nominated	
KM Chart Awards	2026	Best Female Group	Babymonster	Nominated	
Korea First Brand Awards (Note: The Korea First Brand Awards is hosted by the Korea Consumer Brand Committee and the Korea Consumer Forum. Awards are based on a nationwide survey held in South Korea.)	2025	Female Rookie Idol – Vietnam	Babymonster	Won	
Korea First Brand Awards	2025	Female Rookie Idol	Babymonster	Nominated	
Korea First Brand Awards	2026	Female Idol – Hot Trend	Babymonster	Won	
Korea Grand Music Awards	2024	Best 10 Artists	Babymons7er	Nominated	
Korea Grand Music Awards	2024	Best Rookie – Artist	Babymons7er	Nominated	
Korea Grand Music Awards	2024	Best Rookie – Song	"Sheesh"	Nominated	
Korea Grand Music Awards	2024	Best 10 Songs	"Sheesh"	Nominated	
Korea Grand Music Awards	2024	Trend of the Year	Babymonster	Nominated	
Korea Grand Music Awards	2025	Best Artist 10	Babymonster	Nominated	
Korea Grand Music Awards	2025	Best Music 10	"Hot Sauce"	Nominated	
Korea Grand Music Awards	2025	Best Hip-Hop	"Hot Sauce"	Nominated	
K-World Dream Awards	2024	UPICK Popularity Award - Girl Group	Babymonster	Nominated	
MAMA Awards	2024	Fans' Choice Top 10 – Female	Babymonster	Won	
MAMA Awards	2024	Artist of the Year	Babymonster	Nominated	
MAMA Awards	2024	Best New Female Artist	Babymonster	Nominated	
MAMA Awards	2025	Fans' Choice Top 10 – Female	Babymonster	Won	
MAMA Awards	2025	Artist of the Year	Babymonster	Nominated	
MAMA Awards	2025	Album of the Year	Drip	Nominated	
MAMA Awards	2025	Song of the Year	"Drip"	Nominated	
MAMA Awards	2025	Best Dance Performance – Female Group	"Drip"	Nominated	
MAMA Awards	2025	Best Female Group	Babymonster	Nominated	
MAMA Awards	2025	Fans' Choice of the Year	Babymonster	Nominated	
MAMA Awards	2026	Best Female Group	Babymonster	Nominated	
MAMA Awards	2026	Artist of the Year	Babymonster	Nominated	
MAMA Awards	2026	Fans' Choice Top 10 – Female	Babymonster	Won	
Melon Music Awards	2024	Best New Artist	Babymonster	Nominated	
Melon Music Awards	2024	Top 10 Artist	Babymonster	Nominated	
Melon Music Awards	2025	Top 10 Artist	Babymonster	Nominated	
Melon Music Awards	2025	Album of the Year	Drip	Nominated	
Melon Music Awards	2025	Song of the Year	"Drip"	Nominated	
Melon Music Awards	2025	Best Female Group	Babymonster	Nominated	
Melon Music Awards	2025	Berriz Global Fans' Choice	Babymonster	Nominated	
MTV Video Music Awards Japan	2025	Best K-Star Rookie	Babymonster	Nominated	
Music Awards Japan	2025	Album of the Year	Babymons7er	Nominated	
Music Awards Japan	2025	Album of the Year	Drip	Nominated	
Music Awards Japan	2025	Artist of the Year	Babymonster	Nominated	
Music Awards Japan	2025	Best of Listeners' Choice: International Song	"Drip"	Nominated	
Music Awards Japan	2025	Song of the Year	"Drip"	Nominated	
Music Awards Japan	2025	Song of the Year	"Sheesh"	Nominated	
Seoul Music Awards	2025	K-pop World Choice – Group	Babymonster	Won	
Seoul Music Awards	2025	K-Wave Special Award	Babymonster	Nominated	
Seoul Music Awards	2025	Main Prize (Bonsang)	Babymonster	Nominated	
Seoul Music Awards	2025	Popularity Award	Babymonster	Nominated	
Seoul Music Awards	2026	K-pop World Choice – Group	Babymonster	Nominated	
Seoul Music Awards	2026	Main Prize (Bonsang)	Babymonster	Nominated	
Seoul Music Awards	2026	Popularity Award	Babymonster	Nominated	
Seoul Music Awards	2026	R&B Hip-Hop Award	Babymonster	Nominated	

== Listicles ==
Name of publisher, year listed, name of listicle, and placement
Publisher	Year	Listicle	Placement	Ref.
Forbes Korea	2025	K-Idol of the Year 30	20th	
Rolling Stone Korea	2024	Future of Music	Placed	
Sisa Journal (Note: The Sisa Journal is one of the major weekly news magazines in Korea. Established in 1989, its annually conducted 'Who Moves Korea' survey determines the most influential figures in the country and highlights next-generation leaders of Korea. The survey is conducted on a total of 1000 experts across 10 fields, including professors, journalists, politicians, businessmen, and cultural artists.)	2024	Next Generation Leaders	Placed	
