= Drip (Babymonster song) =

Single by Babymonster

from the album Drip
- Language: Korean; English
- Released: November 1, 2024
- Genre: K-pop; dance; hip hop; EDM
- Length: 3:00
- Label: YG
- Composers: Airplay; Illjun; Sandra Wikström; G-Dragon
- Lyricists: Sandra Wikström; YG; Airplay; Masta Wu; Choice37; Sonny
- Producers: Airplay; Illjun; YG

Babymonster singles chronology
"Clik Clak" (2024)	"Drip" (2024)	"Hot Sauce" (2025)

Music video
- "Drip" on YouTube

"Drip" is a song recorded by South Korean girl group Babymonster for their first studio album of the same name. It was released as the album's lead single by YG Entertainment on November 1, 2024

== Background ==
YG Entertainment CEO Yang Hyun-suk revealed on January 24, 2024 that Babymonster would release their first mini album on April 1, with a full-length album planned to be released later in the year. He later announced on May 19 that the group would release a pre-release single for their upcoming debut studio album in early July, and the single "Forever" was released on July 1. On October 8, YG Entertainment announced that Babymonster's debut studio album, Drip, would be released on November 1, with the tracklist released on the same day revealing that Drip would serve as the album's lead single. Yang also revealed in the announcement video that teasers for most tracks would be released in the subsequent weeks, but that no teasers would be released for the title track. The song was released alongside its music video on November 1.

== Composition ==
"Drip" was written by Sandra Wikström, YG, Airplay, Masta Wu, Choice37 and Sonny, and composed by Wikström, BigBang member G-Dragon, Airplay and Illjun, with the latter two handling arrangement alongside YG. It has a duration of three minutes, and is written in key of F-sharp major with a tempo of 120 beats per minute. The song was described by Yang as a danceable hip-hop song with passionate performance from the members. Jeff Benjamin of Billboard described the song as a "mighty K-pop jam" that incorporates dance pop, hip-hop, EDM and powerhouse pop styles. Jeong Gi-yeop of IZM described it as having an "air of swagger" over electronic dance beats with a "three-note high note" from Ahyeon.

== Music video ==
Member Rora explained that the "Drip" music video features freestyle dancing and a relaxed vibe, with the members having fun rather than focusing on intense choreography. She said that while their previous song "Sheesh" was hardcore hip hop, "Drip" is a more easygoing and enjoyable style of hip hop, which reflects the YG-style.

== Charts ==
=== Weekly charts ===
Weekly chart performance
Chart (2024–2025)	Peak position
Global 200 (Billboard)	30
Hong Kong (Billboard)	2
Indonesia (Billboard)	10
Japan (Japan Hot 100)	26
Japan Combined Singles (Oricon)	25
Malaysia (Billboard)	3
Malaysia International (RIM)	3
Netherlands (Global Top 40)	32
New Zealand Hot Singles (RMNZ)	10
Singapore (RIAS)	7
South Korea (Circle)	10
Taiwan (Billboard)	3

=== Monthly charts ===
Monthly chart performance
Chart (2025)	Position
South Korea (Circle)	13

=== Year-end charts ===
Year-end chart performance
Chart (2025)	Position
Japan (Japan Hot 100)	63
South Korea (Circle)	30

== Certifications ==
Certifications
Region	Certification	Certified units/sales
Streaming
Japan (RIAJ)	Platinum	100,000,000^{†}
^{†} Streaming-only figures based on certification alone.

== Release history ==
Release history
Region	Date	Format	Label
Various	November 1, 2024	Digital download; streaming	YG
