= Drip (album) =

- Digital cover

Studio album by Babymonster
- Released: November 1, 2024
- Studio: YG Studio (Seoul)
- Genre: K-pop
- Length: 27:49
- Language: Korean; English; Japanese
- Label: YG
- Producer: Ricky Luna; Airplay; Illjun; YG; Ends; Choice37; G-Dragon; LP; Kang Uk-jin; Diggy; Dee.P

Babymonster chronology
Babymons7er (2024)	Drip (2024)	We Go Up (2025)

Singles from Drip
- 1. "Forever" Released: July 1, 2024; 2. "Clik Clak" Released: October 30, 2024; 3. "Drip" Released: November 1, 2024

Music videos
- "Forever" on YouTube "Clik Clak" on YouTube "Drip" on YouTube "Love in My Heart" on YouTube "Really Like You" on YouTube

Professional ratings
Review scores
Source	Rating
IZM	2.5/5 stars

Drip is the first studio album by South Korean girl group Babymonster. It was released by YG Entertainment on November 1, 2024. The album contains 9 songs, including the title tracks "Drip" and "Clik Clak", and the pre-release single "Forever".

== Background and release ==
On January 24, 2024, YG Entertainment founder Yang Hyun-suk announced plans for the group to release a mini-album on April 1, followed by a full-length album during the fall of the same year. A follow-up announcement by Yang on May 19 revealed plans to release a pre-release single for the upcoming studio album in early July. The single, "Forever", was released on July 1. Filming of music videos in support of the album began on September 23, which was announced on the same day, along with further confirmation of the album's fall release.

On October 8, YG Entertainment officially announced Babymonster's first studio album, titled Drip. The track listing was released on the same day, with the single of the same name announced as the album's lead single. Since the announcement, previews of the first verses of two tracks were released each week preceding the album release: "Clik Clak" and "Love, Maybe" on October 11 and 12, "Woke Up in Tokyo" and "Billionaire" on October 18 and 19, and "Really Like You" and "Love in My Heart" on October 25 and 26, respectively. On October 21, the track "Clik Clak" was announced as the album's second title track. Its music video was released on October 30. Drip was released on November 1, along with the music video for its lead single.

== Composition ==
Drip contains nine tracks. The opening track "Clik Clak" is a minimalistic hip hop song over which all seven members rap with unique styles. The title track, "Drip", is a danceable hip hop track that was co-composed by BigBang member G-Dragon, and the third track, "Love, Maybe", is an intimate ballad with all the members singing over a stripped-back guitar instrumental. This is followed by "Really Like You", which has a '90s hip hop style and was co-written by Mino of Winner, and "Billionaire", which is an R&B song with heavy 808 bass and a Y2K vibe. The sixth track "Love in My Heart" is a lively dance pop track about not hiding feelings that have grown uncontrollably. The seventh track, "Woke Up in Tokyo", is a hip hop song with heavy bass, Japanese lyrics, and wordplay utilizing onomatopoeia, performed by the group's rappers, Ruka and Asa. The pre-release single "Forever" is an upbeat synth-pop song with a bright summer vibe, and the album ends with a remix of "Batter Up" that was performed as an encore during their fanmeeting tour See You There (2024) as a bonus track.

== Commercial performance ==
Drip debuted on the top of the Circle Album Chart in South Korea, and at number 7 on the Billboard Japan Hot Albums chart. A week after its release, YG Entertainment reported a sales count of approximately 820,000 copies, nearly double that of their previous release Babymons7er.

== Track listing ==
Drip track listing
No.	Title	Lyrics	Music	Arrangement(s)	Length
1.	"Clik Clak"	Malaynah; Ricky Luna; Rolando Luna; Choice37; Masta Wu	Ricky Luna; Rolando Luna; Keith Bykoff	Ricky Luna	2:49
2.	"Drip"	Sandra Wikström; YG; Airplay; Masta Wu; Choice37; Sonny	Airplay; Illjun; Wikström; G-Dragon	Airplay; Illjun; YG	3:01
3.	"Love, Maybe"	Wikström; Choice37; Airplay	Airplay; Wikström; Ends	Airplay; Ends	3:08
4.	"Really Like You"	Ryan Bickley; Jonny Hockings; YG; Mino; Bigtone	Airplay; Bickley; Hockings; Freedo; Ends	Airplay; Ends	3:18
5.	"Billionaire"	Lauren Aquilina; Choice37; Wikström	Choice37; LP; Aquilina; Wikström; Sonny; Lil G	Choice37; LP	2:37
6.	"Love in My Heart"	Where the Noise; Jared Lee; YG; Asa; Ruka	Kang Uk-jin; Diggy; J. Lee	Kang; Diggy; YG	3:12
7.	"Woke Up in Tokyo" (Ruka & Asa)	Kyler Niko; Wonderframe; Ricky Luna; Daboyway; Jonathon Keyes; Choice37; Ruka; Asa	Ricky Luna; Rolando Luna	Ricky Luna	2:24
8.	"Forever"	Blvsh; Choice37; Sonny; Lil G; LP	Choice37; LP; Blvsh; Sonny; Lil G	Choice37; LP; YG	3:33
9.	"Batter Up" (remix) (bonus track)	J. Lee; YG; Asa; Choi Hyun-suk; Lee Chan-hyuk; Where the Noise; BigTone	Chaz Mishan; YG; Dee.P; J. Lee; Asa	Dee.P	3:47
Total length:					27:49

== Charts ==
=== Weekly charts ===
Weekly chart performance for Drip
Chart (2024–2026)	Peak position
Hungarian Physical Albums (MAHASZ)	36
Japanese Albums (Oricon)	9
Japanese Combined Albums (Oricon)	8
Japanese Hot Albums (Billboard Japan)	7
South Korean Albums (Circle)	1
UK Album Downloads (OCC)	84
US Billboard 200	149
US Independent Albums (Billboard)	22

=== Monthly charts ===
Monthly chart performance for Drip
Chart (2024)	Peak position
Japanese Albums (Oricon)	40
South Korean Albums (Circle)	6

=== Year-end charts ===
2024 year-end chart performance for Drip
Chart (2024)	Position
South Korean Albums (Circle)	49

2025 year-end chart performance for Drip
Chart (2025)	Position
Japanese Hot Albums (Billboard Japan)	26

== Certifications ==
Certifications for Drip
Region	Certification	Certified units/sales
South Korea (KMCA) Standard	Platinum	250,000^{^}
South Korea (KMCA) Nemo	2× Platinum	500,000^{^}
^{^} Shipments figures based on certification alone.

== Release history ==
Release history for Drip
Region	Date	Format	Label	Ref.
United States	November 1, 2024	CD	Alliance	
Japan	November 1, 2024	CD	Sony Records	
South Korea	November 1, 2024	CD	YG	
Various	November 1, 2024	Digital download; streaming	YG	
