= Forever (Babymonster song) =

Single by Babymonster

from the album Drip
- Language: Korean
- Released: July 1, 2024
- Genre: K-pop
- Length: 3:33
- Label: YG
- Composers: Choice37; LP; Blvsh; Sonny; Lil G
- Lyricists: Blvsh; Choice37; Sonny; Lil G; LP; Masta Wu
- Producers: Choice37; LP; Yang Hyun-suk

Babymonster singles chronology
"Sheesh" (2024)	"Forever" (2024)	"Clik Clak" (2024)

Music video
- "Forever" on YouTube

"Forever" is a song recorded by South Korean girl group Babymonster. It was released by YG Entertainment on July 1, 2024, as a pre-release single for their first studio album, Drip (2024).

== Background and release ==
On January 24, 2024, YG Entertainment founder Yang Hyun-suk announced plans for the group to release a mini-album on April 1, followed by a full-length album during the fall of the same year. A follow-up announcement by Yang on May 19 revealed plans to release a pre-release single for the upcoming studio album in early July.

On June 17, 2024, a teaser for Babymonster's new single was released on the group's social media page, titled RSVP along with the date July 1, 2024. The name of the single, "Forever", was revealed a day later. Individual posters were released on June 24, followed by a teaser for the music video for the single the next day. The single was released digitally on July 1, along with its accompanying music video.

== Credits and personnel ==
Adapted from Melon credits:

- Babymonster – vocals
- Blvsh – lyrics
- Sonny – lyrics, composition, arrangement, backing vocals
- Choice37 – lyrics, composition, arrangement, keyboard. backing vocals
- Lil G – lyrics, composition, backing vocals
- LP – lyrics, composition, arrangement, keyboard, backing vocals
- Masta Wu – lyrics
- YG – arrangement

== Charts ==
=== Weekly charts ===
Weekly chart performance
Chart (2024)	Peak position
Global 200 (Billboard)	141
Hong Kong (Billboard)	16
Indonesia (Billboard)	20
Japan (Japan Hot 100)	92
Japan Heatseekers (Billboard Japan)	4
Malaysia (Billboard)	7
Singapore (RIAS)	12
South Korea (Circle)	101
Taiwan (Billboard)	6
US World Digital Song Sales (Billboard)	7

=== Monthly charts ===
Monthly chart performance
Chart (2024)	Position
South Korea (Circle)	106

== Release history ==
Release history
Region	Date	Format	Label
Various	July 1, 2024	Digital download; streaming	YG
