= Choom (EP) =

- Digital cover

EP by Babymonster
- Released: May 4, 2026
- Genre: K-pop
- Length: 12:11
- Languages: Korean; English
- Label: YG
- Producers: Oskar Widén; Oliver Ländin; YG; P.K; Dee.P; 2K; Diggy; Kang Uk-jin; Aiplay; Ends

Babymonster chronology
We Go Up (2025)	Choom (2026)

Singles from Choom
- 1. "Choom" Released: May 4, 2026

Choom (Korean: 춤; lit. 'Dance') is the third extended play by South Korean girl group Babymonster. It was released on May 4, 2026, by YG Entertainment, and includes four songs, including the lead single of the same name. To support the EP, Babymonster will embark on the Choom World Tour in 2026–27.

== Background and release ==
On March 4, 2026, YG Entertainment announced in its 2026 roadmap that Babymonster would release their third extended play titled Choom in May 2026. On March 30, a teaser video for the extended play was uploaded, revealing that it would be released on May 4. From April 12 to 14, individual concept photos for the EP were released, depicting the members in mugshot-style photos, and a group concept photo was released on April 17. The track listing for the EP was revealed on April 20. Three moving poster clips were released on April 27, featuring a snippet of the title track. In an update video released on April 30, YG executive producer Yang Hyun-suk revealed that in addition to the music video for the title track, "Choom", music videos for "I Like It" and "Moon" are scheduled to be released in July and August, respectively. Choom was released on May 4, alongside the music video for the title track. A dance performance video for the title track was released on May 6.

== Composition ==
The opening track, "Moon", is a dark hip-hop track with a "sophisticated and unique sound design". The title track, "Choom", is a hip-hop song characterized by "bouncy synth riff and heavy percussive sounds" with lyrics delivering a "message about music fans uniting through dance". The third track, "I Like It", is a dance song. The final track, "Locked In", is an R&B song.

== Promotion ==
Following the extended play's release, on May 4, Babymonster hosted a comeback livestream, showcasing the choreography for the title track and interacting with fans through various segments. The group will embark on the Choom World Tour in 2026–27, beginning with three shows in Seoul June 26–28, and continuing in six cities in Japan, with more dates in Asia, Oceania, Europe, North America and South America to be announced.

== Track listing ==
Choom track listing
No.	Title	Lyrics	Music	Arrangement	Length
1.	"Moon"	Jonna Hall; Lova Sönnerbo; Choice37; Lil G; Malaynah	Oskar Widén; Oliver Ländin; Jonna Hall; Lova Sönnerbo; Malaynah; YG	Oskar Widén; Oliver Ländin; YG	2:46
2.	"Choom" (춤)	YG; Lauren Aquilina; Choice37; Jonna Hall; Kim Mingu (Nine); Sandra Wikström; Malaynah	YG; P.K; Dee.P; 2K; Jonna Hall; Kim Mingu (Nine)	YG; P.K; Dee.P; 2K	2:58
3.	"I Like It"	Where the Noise; YG; Jared Lee; Lauren Aquilina; Sandra Wikström	Kang Uk-jin; Diggy; Where the Noise; Jared Lee; Dee.P; P.K; Me&My; Sandra Wikström	Dee.P; P.K; Diggy; Kang Uk-jin	3:26
4.	"Locked In"	Lauren Aquilina; Malaynah	Airplay; Lauren Aquilina; Ends	Airplay; Ends	3:01
Total length:					12:11

== Charts ==
=== Weekly charts ===
Weekly chart performance for Choom
Chart (2026)	Peak position
Austrian Albums (Ö3 Austria)	32
Belgian Albums (Ultratop Flanders)	21
Belgian Albums (Ultratop Wallonia)	19
Croatian International Albums (HDU)	23
German Albums (Offizielle Top 100)	41
Hungarian Albums (MAHASZ)	27
Japanese Albums (Oricon)	5
Japanese Combined Albums (Oricon)	5
Japanese Hot Albums (Billboard Japan)	6
Portuguese Albums (AFP)	15
South Korean Albums (Circle)	1
UK Singles Sales (OCC)	18
US World Albums (Billboard)	18

=== Monthly charts ===
Monthly chart performance for Choom
Chart (2026)	Peak position
Japanese Albums (Oricon)	13
South Korean Albums (Circle)	9

== Certifications ==
Certifications for Choom
Region	Certification	Certified units/sales
South Korea (KMCA) Standard	2× Platinum	500,000^{^}
South Korea (KMCA) Nemo	Platinum	250,000^{^}
^{^} Shipments figures based on certification alone.

== Release history ==
Release history for Choom
Region	Date	Format	Label
South Korea	May 2026	CD	YG
Various	May 2026	Digital download; streaming	YG
