= We Go Up (Babymonster EP) =

- Digital cover

EP by Babymonster
- Released: October 10, 2025
- Genre: K-pop
- Length: 12:12
- Languages: Korean; English
- Label: YG
- Producers: Diggy; Kang Uk-jin; Dee.P; P.K; YG; Choice37; LP; Airplay; Iljun

Babymonster chronology
Drip (2024)	We Go Up (2025)	Choom (2026)

Singles from We Go Up
- 1. "We Go Up" Released: October 10, 2025

We Go Up (stylized in all caps) is the second extended play by South Korean girl group Babymonster. It was released by YG Entertainment on October 10, 2025, and consists of four tracks, including the lead single of the same name. The EP blends several genres, including hip hop, dance, R&B, and country pop. Member Rami did not participate in the EP due to ongoing health issues.

== Background and release ==
On May 26, 2025, YG Entertainment announced that Babymonster would release their second extended play on October 1, with a pre-release single, "Hot Sauce", set be released on July 1 and another set for release in September. However, on August 18, YG Entertainment founder Yang Hyun-suk detailed that Babymonster's second EP We Go Up would now be released a week later, on October 10, to avoid conflicting with the Chuseok holiday. He also revealed that "Hot Sauce" would no longer be included in the EP, and revealed the track titles. On September 12, it was revealed that member Rami had not participated in the recording of the EP due to a hiatus related to ongoing health issues, and the group would continue promotions as six members. The EP's track listing was revealed on September 23. The EP was released alongside the music video for the title track on October 10. An exclusive performance video for the title track was released on October 14. Music videos for the b-side tracks "Psycho" and "Supa Dupa Luv" were released on November 19 and December 19, respectively.

== Composition ==
The title track is a high energy hip hop song, with lyrics about "aiming high and pushing to be better" The track features brass in the intro, with intense rapping and high notes from the members. The second track, "Psycho", blends several genres, including hip hop, dance and rock, with an addictive melody. The third track, "Supa Dupa Love", is a slow hip-hop-influenced R&B love song, and the closing track, "Wild", is a country pop dance song.

== Track listing ==
We Go Up track listing
No.	Title	Lyrics	Music	Arrangement(s)	Length
1.	"We Go Up"	Where the Noise; Sandra Wikström; Choice37; Lauren Aquilina; YG	Diggy; Where the Noise; Kang Uk-jin; Sandra Wikström; Dee.P; P.K.	Diggy; Kang Uk-jin; Dee.P; P.K.	3:06
2.	"Psycho"	Sandra Wikström; Choice37; YG; LP; Lil G; Sonny	Choice37; LP; YG; P.K; Dee.P; Sandra Wikström; Lil G; Sonny	YG; P.K.; Dee.P; Choice37	3:15
3.	"Supa Dupa Luv"	Lauren Aquilina; Choice37	Choice37; LP; Lauren Aquilina	Choice37; LP	2:52
4.	"Wild"	Lauren Aquilina; Airplay; YG; Kid Wine	Airplay; Lauren Aquilina; YG; Iljun	Airplay; Iljun	2:57
Total length:					12:12

== Charts ==
=== Weekly charts ===
Weekly chart performance for We Go Up
Chart (2025–2026)	Peak position
Austrian Albums (Ö3 Austria)	60
Belgian Albums (Ultratop Flanders)	43
Belgian Albums (Ultratop Wallonia)	63
Croatian International Albums (HDU)	15
German Albums (Offizielle Top 100)	93
Hungarian Albums (MAHASZ)	23
Japanese Albums (Oricon)	4
Japanese Combined Albums (Oricon)	4
Japanese Hot Albums (Billboard Japan)	9
Portuguese Albums (AFP)	56
South Korean Albums (Circle)	1
US Top Album Sales (Billboard)	13
US Independent Albums (Billboard)	41

=== Monthly charts ===
Monthly chart performance for We Go Up
Chart (2025)	Position
Japanese Albums (Oricon)	16
South Korean Albums (Circle)	4

=== Year-end charts ===
Year-end chart performance for We Go Up
Chart (2025)	Position
Japanese Albums (Oricon)	80
South Korean Albums (Circle)	33

== Certifications ==
Certifications for We Go Up
Region	Certification	Certified units/sales
Japan (RIAJ)	Gold	100,000^{^}
South Korea (KMCA)	2× Platinum	500,000^{^}
^{^} Shipments figures based on certification alone.

== Release history ==
Release history for We Go Up
Region	Date	Format	Label	Ref
Various	October 10, 2025	Digital download; streaming	YG	
South Korea	October 10, 2025	CD	YG	
United States	October 10, 2025	CD	YG; Hello82	
