= Sheesh (Babymonster song) =

Single by Babymonster

from the EP Babymons7er
- Language: Korean; English
- Released: April 1, 2024
- Genre: K-pop; hip hop; dance
- Length: 2:50
- Label: YG
- Composers: Choice37; LP; YG; Sonny; Lil G; Choi Hyun-suk; Sandra Wikström
- Lyricists: Choice37; Sonny; Lil G; LP; Choi Hyun-suk; Sandra Wikström

Babymonster singles chronology
"Stuck in the Middle" (2024)	"Sheesh" (2024)	"Forever" (2024)

Music video
- "Sheesh" on YouTube

"Sheesh" is a song recorded by South Korean girl group Babymonster for their first extended play Babymons7er. It was released as the EP's third single by YG Entertainment on April 1, 2024.

== Background and release ==
On February 28, 2024, YG Entertainment announced Babymonster would be releasing their first extended play, Babymons7er, on April 1. It was also announced that Ahyeon would be joining the group after recovering from her health issues. On March 18, Yang Hyun-suk announced "Sheesh" as the lead single. The music video teaser featuring individual members was released on March 21 to 27 (in order: Ahyeon, Ruka, Chiquita, Rora, Asa, Pharita, and Rami). On March 28, a teaser video was released, followed by the album track sampler video a day later. The song was released alongside its music video and the extended play on April 1.

== Composition ==
"Sheesh" was co-written by Choice37, Sonny, Lil G, LP, Choi Hyun-suk, and Sandra Wikström, with YG contributing to the composition alongside them. The arrangement was handled by LP, Choice37, YG, and Dee.P. Described as a hip hop dance song featuring "baroque-style piano melody and synthesizer rhythm". "Sheesh" was composed in the key of D major, with a tempo of 140 beats per minute.

== Music video ==
The music video was released alongside the song by YG Entertainment on April 1, 2024. It surpassed 13.7 million views within 12 hours of release. The visual depicts "Babymonster roam[ing] the halls of an abandoned, haunted mansion" with later a scene "revealing [the mansion] to be laid out like an elaborate maze".

== Promotion ==
Prior to the release of Babymons7er, on March 31, 2024, Babymonster held a live event titled "Babymonster Debut Countdown Special" on YouTube, Weverse, and Naver, aimed at introducing the extended play and its tracks, including "Sheesh", and connecting with their fanbase.

== Accolades ==
On South Korean music programs, "Sheesh" achieved a first place win on the May 2 episode of M Countdown.

== Charts ==
=== Weekly charts ===
Weekly chart performance
Chart (2024)	Peak position
Global 200 (Billboard)	33
Hong Kong (Billboard)	10
Indonesia (Billboard)	4
Japan (Japan Hot 100)	42
Japan Heatseekers (Billboard Japan)	1
Japan Combined Singles (Oricon)	41
Malaysia (Billboard)	4
Netherlands (Global Top 40)	12
New Zealand Hot Singles (RMNZ)	30
Singapore (RIAS)	6
South Korea (Circle)	10
Taiwan (Billboard)	3

=== Monthly charts ===
Monthly chart performance
Chart (2024)	Position
South Korea (Circle)	25

=== Year-end charts ===
Year-end chart performance
Chart (2024)	Position
Japan Heatseekers (Billboard Japan)	7
South Korea (Circle)	55

== Certifications ==
Certifications
Region	Certification	Certified units/sales
Streaming
Japan (RIAJ)	Platinum	100,000,000^{†}
^{†} Streaming-only figures based on certification alone.

== Release history ==
Release history
Region	Date	Format	Label
Various	April 1, 2024	Digital download; streaming	YG
