= Stuck in the Middle (Babymonster song) =

Single by Babymonster

from the EP Babymons7er
- Language: English
- Released: February 1, 2024
- Length: 4:06
- Label: YG
- Composers: Dee.P; Jared Lee; Dan Whittemore
- Lyricists: Jared Lee; Dan Whittemore

Babymonster singles chronology
"Batter Up" (2023)	"Stuck in the Middle" (2024)	"Sheesh" (2024)

Music video
- "Stuck in the Middle" on YouTube

"Stuck in the Middle" is a song by South Korean girl group Babymonster. It was released on February 1, 2024, by YG Entertainment, as a pre-release single for their first extended play, Babymons7er (2024).

== Background and release ==
On January 1, 2024, YG Entertainment founder Yang Hyun-suk announced through a video published on YouTube that Babymonster would be releasing their second single titled "Stuck in the Middle" on February 1, 2024. The release was confirmed through a teaser on January 25, where it was also announced that song is a pre-release single for their upcoming EP. A concept poster was released one day later, featuring the members of Babymonster wearing a bright white dress in a fantasy-like landscape, which was described as "a stark contrast to the energetic and sporty image that they showed in their debut single "Batter Up". The song and its accompanying music video was released on February 1.

== Composition ==
"Stuck in the Middle" was written by Jared Lee and Dan Whittemore, both of whom also composed the song alongside Dee.P. In Yang's announcement video, he described the song as "not a hip-hop track" which makes him "wonder if YG has ever released a song like this" and listening to it "feels like being in a state of zero gravity in outer space", suggesting at a vast shift in tone and genre compared to the group's previous single "Batter Up". The song was also described as "an emotional ballad that handles the confusing emotions of love through the members' soulful vocals".

== Charts ==
Chart performance for "Stuck in the Middle"
Chart (2024)	Peak position
South Korea Download (Circle)	45

== Release history ==
Release history for "Stuck in the Middle"
Region	Date	Format	Label
Various	February 1, 2024	Digital download; streaming	YG
