= Masta Wu =

South Korean rapper

Masta Wu 마스타 우
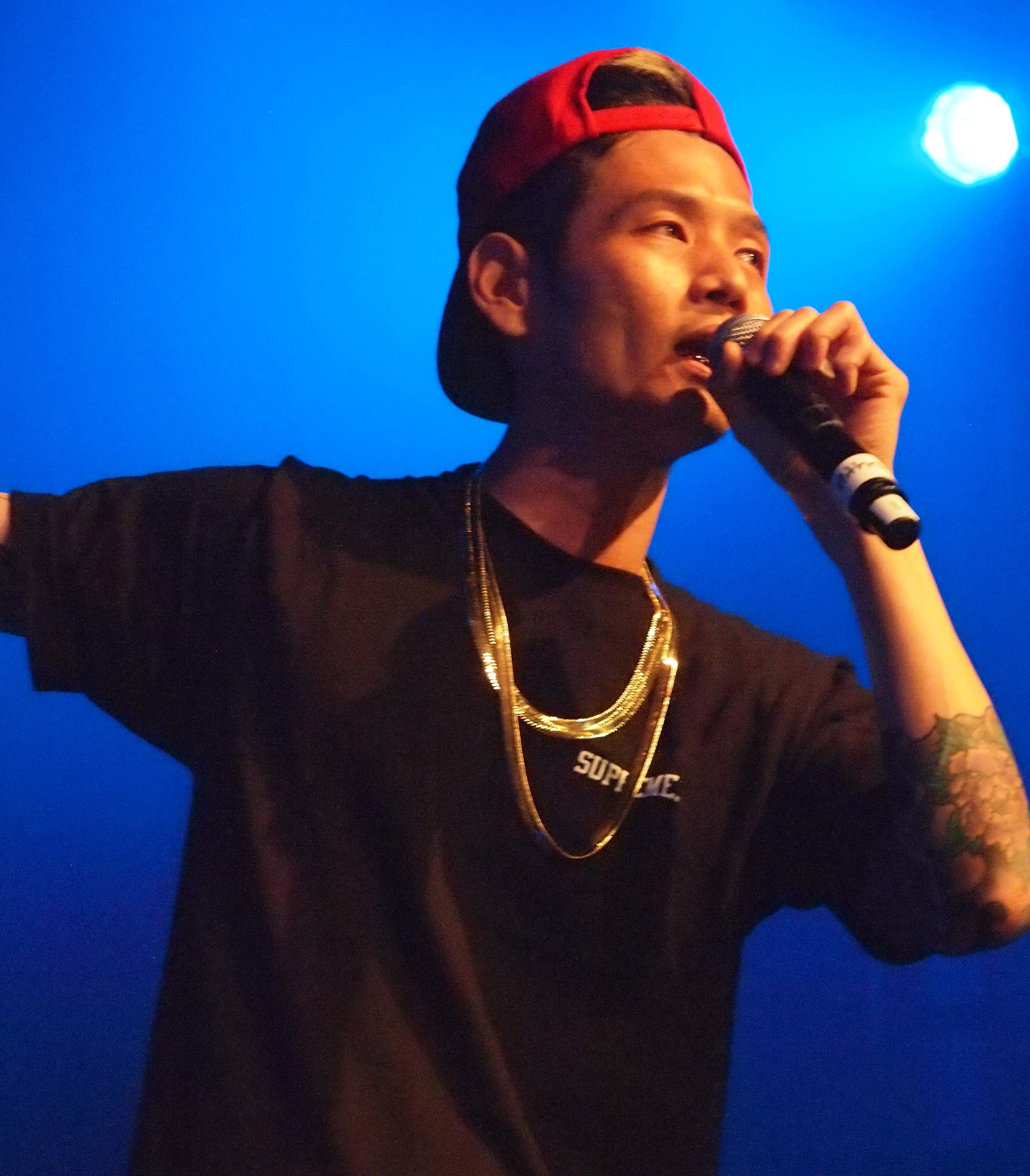
- Masta Wu on June 12, 2015 in New York City

Background information
- Born: Woo Jin-won; October 25, 1978 (age 48); Seoul, South Korea
- Genre: Hip hop
- Occupations: Rapper; composer
- Years active: 2000–present
- Labels: XYZ Entertainment; YG Entertainment
- Formerly of: YMGA; YG Family

Woo Jin-won (Korean: 우진원, October 25, 1978), better known by his stage name Masta Wu (마스타 우), is a South Korean rapper, songwriter and producer. His previous stage name was Ginnwon. He was also a part of the hip hop project duo YMGA.

== Career ==
After being an underground rapper, Woo signed with YG Entertainment. He released his first album, Masta Peace in 2003, and his second album Brand Wu Year in 2007.

In 2014, he was one of the producers of the talent show Show Me the Money 3.

He wrote several songs for his label-mates, for example project duo Hi Suhyun, solo singer Lee Hi and girl band 2NE1. As of December 2023 he has 93 songs credited to his name at the Korea Music Copyright Association.

In 2016, he announced his departure from YG Entertainment to establish his own label.

In 2020, Masta Wu released the song "Romance" via his SoundCloud. The song served as a pre-release to his first extended play, Father.

In 2023, Masta Wu released a new single called "Water," announcing that he would be releasing his third full album later in the year.

== Discography ==
=== Studio albums ===
| Title | Album details | Peak chart positions | Sales |
| Title | Album details | KOR | Sales |
|---|---|---|---|
| Masta Peace | Released: June 20, 2003; Label: YG Entertainment; Formats: CD, cassette | 32 | KOR: 7,639 |
| Brand Wu Year | Released: March 22, 2007; Label: YG Entertainment; Formats: CD | 43 | KOR: 1,261 |

=== Extended plays ===
- Father (2020)

=== Singles ===
| Title | Year | Peak chart positions | Sales | Album |
| Title | Year | KOR | Sales | Album |
|---|---|---|---|---|
| "Bad Boy" (문제아) | 2003 | — | | Masta Peace |
| "Everything's All Rite" (feat. Jieun) | 2007 | — | | Brand Wu Year |
| "Come Here" (이리와봐) (feat. Dok2 and Bobby) | 2014 | 8 | KOR: 196,078 | Non-album singles |
| "Yamaha" (야마하) (feat. Red Roc and Okasian) | 2016 | — | | Non-album singles |
| "Shit" (feat. Dok2) | 2017 | — | | Non-album singles |
| "Gold" (feat. E Sens) | 2020 | — | | Father |
| "Water" (feat. Keith Ape) | 2023 | — | | Non-album single |
"—" denotes release did not chart.
