= Batter Up (Babymonster song) =

Single by Babymonster

from the EP Babymons7er
- Language: Korean; English
- Released: November 27, 2023
- Genre: Hip hop; trap
- Length: 3:08
- Label: YG
- Composers: Chaz Mishan; Yang Hyun-suk; Dee.P; Jared Lee; Asa
- Lyricists: Jared Lee; Yang Hyun-suk; Asa; Choi Hyun-suk; Lee Chan-hyuk; Where the Noise; BigTone
- Producers: Yang Hyun-suk; Dee.P; Chaz Mishan

Babymonster singles chronology
"Batter Up" (2023)	"Stuck in the Middle" (2024)

Alternative cover
- Japanese version digital cover

Music video
- "Batter Up" on YouTube

"Batter Up" is a song recorded by South Korean girl group Babymonster. It was released on November 27, 2023, by YG Entertainment. The Japanese version of the single was released through YGEX on August 16, 2024.

== Background and release ==
On December 30, 2022, YG Entertainment introduced their upcoming new girl group Babymonster though the release of a teaser poster. In 2023, the seven members were introduced in the reality show Last Evaluation, where it was also announced that the group would be debuting in September later that year. On November 10, after the supposed debut month, YG Entertainment confirmed a debut date of November 27. Ten days later, the digital single "Batter Up" was announced as Babymonster's debut release. On November 24, the teaser for the music video was released.

== Composition ==
"Batter Up" was written by Jared Lee, Yang Hyun-suk, Babymonster member Asa, Treasure member Choi Hyun-suk, AKMU member Lee Chan-hyuk, and songwriting teams Where the Noise and BigTone, and composed by Chaz Mishan, Yang Hyun-suk, Dee.P, Jared Lee, and Asa. It is described as a song with "hip-hop and trap" sounds characteristic of YG Entertainment.

== Critical reception ==
Professional ratings
Review scores
Source	Rating
IZM	2/5 stars
NME	2/5 stars

Yoo Ji-hee from Daily Sports expressed that the group succeeded in establishing a clear identity apart from their labelmate seniors 2NE1 and Blackpink, and wrote how the song evokes "a familiar taste". Rhian Daily from NME rated the song two out of five stars, calling it "a tired formula" with "lazy songwriting" and commented "Even in the moments that are clearly designed to be the track's earworm moments, it feels weak and leaves no lasting impression".

== Accolades ==
Awards and nominations for "Batter Up"
Award ceremony	Year	Category	Result	Ref.
Circle Chart Music Awards	2024	Rookie of the Year – Global Streaming	Won	
Circle Chart Music Awards	2024	Rookie of the Year – Streaming Unique Listeners	Nominated	

== Charts ==
=== Weekly charts ===
Weekly chart performance for "Batter Up"
Chart (2023)	Peak position
Global 200 (Billboard)	101
Hong Kong (Billboard)	22
Indonesia (Billboard)	14
Japan (Japan Hot 100)	100
Japan Heatseekers (Billboard Japan)	7
Malaysia (Billboard)	9
Netherlands (Global Top 40)	14
New Zealand Hot Singles (RMNZ)	14
Singapore (RIAS)	10
South Korea (Circle)	123
Taiwan (Billboard)	7
US World Digital Song Sales (Billboard)	5
Vietnam (Vietnam Hot 100)	14

=== Monthly charts ===
Monthly chart performance for "Batter Up"
Chart (2023)	Position
South Korea (Circle)	172

== Release history ==
Release history for "Batter Up"
Region	Date	Format	Version	Label	Ref.
Various	November 27, 2023	Digital download; streaming	Original	YG	
Various	April 1, 2024	Digital download; streaming	7 version	YG	
Various	August 16, 2024	Digital download; streaming	Japanese	Sony Japan	
Various	November 1, 2024	Digital download; streaming	Remix	YG	
