= Babymons7er =

EP by Babymonster
- Released: April 1, 2024
- Genre: K-pop
- Length: 20:01
- Languages: Korean; English
- Label: YG
- Producers: Dee.P; Ice; LP; Choice37; YG; Charlie Puth; Count Baldor; Chaz Mishan; Hae; Jared Lee; Dan Whittemore; Sonny

Babymonster chronology
Babymons7er (2024)	Drip (2024)

Singles from Babymons7er
- 1. "Batter Up" Released: November 27, 2023; 2. "Stuck in the Middle" Released: February 1, 2024; 3. "Sheesh" Released: April 1, 2024

Babymons7er (stylized in all caps) is the debut extended play by South Korean girl group Babymonster. It was released by YG Entertainment on April 1, 2024.

== Background and release ==
Babymonster debuted on November 27, 2023, with the release of the single "Batter Up" as a six-piece ensemble. Member Ahyeon, whom due to personal health issues, was unable to partake in the group's activities and was excluded from the debut line-up. On December 31, YG Entertainment founder Yang Hyun-suk announced plans for the group to release their first EP in April 2024, following the release of the pre-release single "Stuck in the Middle" on February 1, 2024. A follow up announcement by Yang on January 24, 2024, revealed that Ahyeon has recovered from her health issues and will be rejoining the group to promote their upcoming EP in April. The group's previously released singles were also re-recorded with Ahyeon.

On February 28, YG Entertainment officially announced the release of the group's first EP titled Babymons7er, scheduled for an April 1 release. On March 10, YG released a trailer for the EP. On March 18, Yang announced the EP's track listing.

== Composition ==
In Yang's announcement of the EP's track listing, he described the title track "Sheesh" as a hip-hop song with a powerful chorus and a darker tone compared to the group's debut single "Batter Up". He further adds that the track "Like That" was written and gifted to the group by American singer-songwriter Charlie Puth, after member Ahyeon's cover of Puth's song "Dangerously" attracted the attention of many global fans, including Puth himself. The track "Dream" was previously unofficially released for Babymonster's pre-debut reality show Last Evaluation.

== Critical reception ==
Professional ratings
Review scores
Source	Rating
NME	2/5 stars

NME's Carmen Chin gave the album two out of five stars, criticizing the group's attempt to carve their own identity amidst recycled material reminiscent of Blackpink. She found that while some tracks show potential, overall, the album falls short of establishing themselves as a unique and original act.

== Track listing ==
Babymons7er track listing
No.	Title	Lyrics	Music	Arrangement(s)	Length
1.	"Monsters (Intro)"	Jared Lee	Ice; Dee.P; J. Lee	Dee.P; Ice	0:44
2.	"Sheesh"	Choice37; Sonny; Lil G; LP; Choi Hyun-suk; Sandra Wikström	Choice37; LP; YG; Sonny; Lil G; Choi; Wikström	LP; Choice37; YG; Dee.P	2:50
3.	"Like That"	Charlie Puth; Jacob Kasher Hindlin; Choice37; J. Lee	Puth; Hindlin	Puth; Count Baldor	2:48
4.	"Stuck in the Middle" (7 version)	J. Lee; Dan Whittemore	Dee.P; J. Lee; Whittemore	Dee.P	4:06
5.	"Batter Up" (7 version)	J. Lee; YG; Asa; Choi; Lee Chan-hyuk; Where the Noise; BigTone	Chaz Mishan; YG; Dee.P; J. Lee; Asa	YG; Dee.P; Mishan	3:08
6.	"Dream"	J. Lee; Choice37; Whittemore; Sonny; Lil G	J. Lee; Choice37; Whittemore; Sonny; Hae; LP; Lil G	Choice37; Hae; LP; J. Lee; Whittemore; Sonny	3:03
7.	"Stuck in the Middle" (remix)	J. Lee; Whittemore	Dee.P; J. Lee; Whittemore	LP; Choice37	3:19
Total length:					20:01

== Charts ==
=== Weekly charts ===
Weekly chart performance for Babymons7er
Chart (2024)	Peak position
Croatian International Albums (HDU)	5
Japanese Albums (Oricon)	6
Japanese Combined Albums (Oricon)	7
Japanese Hot Albums (Billboard Japan)	17
Nigerian Albums (TurnTable)	98
South Korean Albums (Circle)	3
UK Album Downloads (Official Charts)	69
US World Albums (Billboard)	15

=== Monthly charts ===
Monthly chart performance for Babymons7er
Chart (2024)	Position
Japanese Albums (Oricon)	38
South Korean Albums (Circle)	9

=== Year-end charts ===
2024 year-end chart performance for Babymons7er
Chart (2024)	Position
South Korean Albums (Circle)	47

2025 year-end chart performance for Babymons7er
Chart (2025)	Position
Japanese Hot Albums (Billboard Japan)	100

== Certifications ==
Certifications for Babymons7er
Region	Certification	Certified units/sales
South Korea (KMCA) Physical	Platinum	250,000^{^}
South Korea (KMCA) Nemo version	2× Platinum	500,000^{^}
^{^} Shipments figures based on certification alone.

== Release history ==
Release history for Babymons7er
Region	Date	Format	Label	Ref.
Japan	April 1, 2024	CD	Sony Records	
South Korea	April 1, 2024	CD	YG	
Various	April 1, 2024	Digital download; streaming	YG	
