= Babymonster =

South Korean girl group

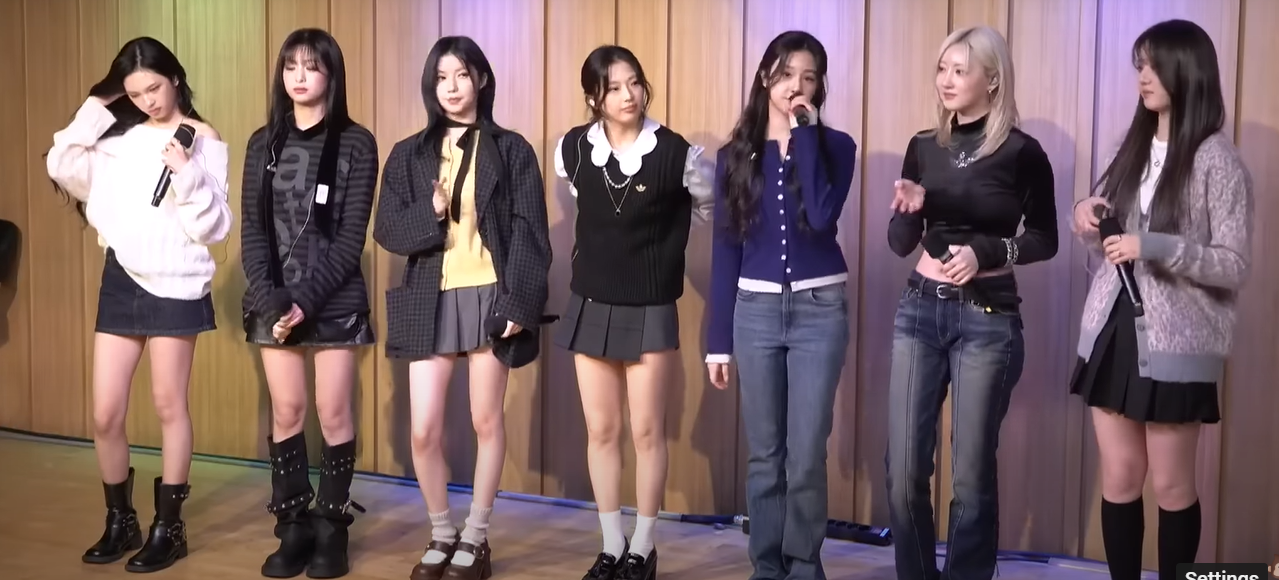
- Babymonster in 2024; L–R: Chiquita, Ahyeon, Asa, Ruka, Pharita, Rami, Rora

Background information
- Also known as: Baemon
- Origin: Seoul, South Korea
- Genre: K-pop
- Years active: 2023–present
- Labels: YG; Sony Music Japan
- Members: Ruka; Pharita; Asa; Ahyeon; Rami; Rora; Chiquita
- Website: yg-babymonster.com

Babymonster (Korean: 베이비몬스터; stylized in all caps), also referred to as Baemon (/ˈbeɪmɒn/ BAY-mon; 베몬), is a South Korean girl group formed by YG Entertainment. The group is composed of seven members: Ruka, Pharita, Asa, Ahyeon, Rami, Rora, and Chiquita.

Babymonster debuted as a full ensemble on April 1, 2024, with their eponymous extended play (EP) Babymons7er. Its single, "Sheesh", became their first top-ten entry on South Korea's Circle Digital Chart. In November, the group subsequently released their first studio album Drip, which surpassed one million copies in domestic sales and became their earliest entry on the Billboard 200; its title track spawned their second top-ten hit in South Korea and marked their first single to earn platinum certification for streaming from the Recording Industry Association of Japan. In 2025, the group released their second extended play We Go Up and embarked on the Hello Monsters World Tour.

== History ==
=== 2018–2022: Formation and pre-debut activities ===
Following the launch of YG Entertainment's representative girl groups, 2NE1 (2009) and Blackpink (2016), news of their next girl group circulated as early as 2018. Applicants were recruited from various countries, with some trainees entering the program as early as age ten and completing an average of four to five years of training. Each prospective member prevailed over thousands in their respective auditions. In 2020, "Babymonster", one of many names initially considered for Blackpink, and "Baemon" (a syllabic abbreviation of the former) were trademarked in English and Korean at the Korean Intellectual Property Office by the label, and were tentatively used by media outlets as provisional names until the official disclosure of the names. The early idea of the group was as a Big Mama-style, R&B‑oriented vocal group, with internal reports describing an emphasis on candidates with strong, distinct vocal timbres.

Its selection process was chronicled in Last Evaluation (2023), a reality show filmed in the previous year prior to its airing, showcasing seven potential members. Label founder and executive producer, Yang Hyun-suk, enlisted assistance by Lee Su-hyun of AKMU, and Winner's Kang Seung-yoon and Lee Seung-hoon amidst others to judge, rank, and determine its formation for the duration of the show. Yang revealed the number of members he first planned was five; however, a seven-piece ensemble was finalized with three South Koreans (Ahyeon, Rami, Rora), two Japanese (Ruka, Asa), and two Thai members (Pharita, Chiquita). Ahyeon, Ruka, Chiquita, Rami, and Pharita were selected by the label, while Rora and Asa were contemplated to be placed into two different projects before ultimately joining the final line-up as the "fans' choice".

Leading to their acceptance into the label, the seven members accumulated disparate forms of television and entertainment experience: Rami started as a child model at age two; Ruka debuted in the Japanese girl group Shibu3 project; Rora performed in the children's music band U.SSO Girl with Hyein of NewJeans; and Pharita participated in modeling contests and audition programs. Once admitted to the company's training program, Ruka, the longest trained member of the seven, Rora, and Asa, trained under the company for six years. Rami and Ahyeon trained for five years, while Pharita, selected from 1,226 applicants, trained for four. Chiquita, the final recruit, joined after a brief three month training period, the shortest of all seven, and subsequently trained alongside the rest for three years. During this preparatory phase, the trainees underwent monthly evaluations and occasionally provided guide and background vocals for their labelmates (i.e. the final chorus of Kang Seung-yoon's "Iyah" (아이야; aiya)).

=== 2023–2024: Introduction and debut ===
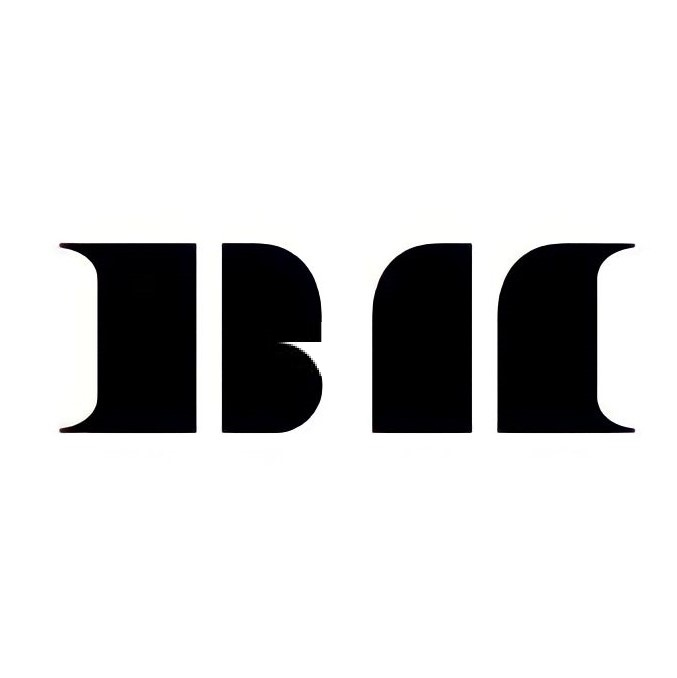
Babymonster's logo (2023)

YG Entertainment signaled the septet's formal introduction on December 30, 2022, with a poster and the subtext "YG Next Movement". It heralded a trailer-esque video posted on YouTube on New Year's Day and featured appearances by members of Winner and Blackpink, sibling duo AKMU, dancer and choreographer Leejung Lee, and label founder and executive producer Yang Hyun-suk. The seven members were revealed to the public through the gradual releases of live performance videos starting on January 12 (in order: Rami, Ahyeon, Chiquita, Asa, Rora, Pharita, and Ruka). They released a pre-debut promotional single titled "Dream" on May 14, 2023, coinciding with the release of Last Evaluation (2023); the YouTube exclusive debuted atop the Billboard Hot Trending Songs chart. Their channel soon surpassed one million subscribers in 52 days since its creation on December 28, 2022, and two million subscribers in 129 days, becoming the fastest K-pop girl group to achieve this milestone.

The group released two singles as a six-piece titled "Batter Up" and "Stuck in the Middle" on November 27, 2023, and February 1, 2024, respectively; the former served both as the sextet's debut single and Babymonster's pre-debut release. "Batter Up" was co-written by labelmates Lee Chan-hyuk of AKMU and Choi Hyun-suk of Treasure, with member Asa contributing to its composition and lyrics. Its music video amassed 22.59 million views within twenty-four hours, setting a new record for the most‑viewed debut music video in K‑pop history, and surpassed 100 million views eighteen days after release, the fastest for a debut video on the platform. The single also achieved 10 million streams on Spotify within ten days, setting the fastest precedent for a rookie K‑pop girl group. Ahyeon, who was absent from its releases for health reasons, soon joined the ensemble to promote their future activities as a seven-member group.

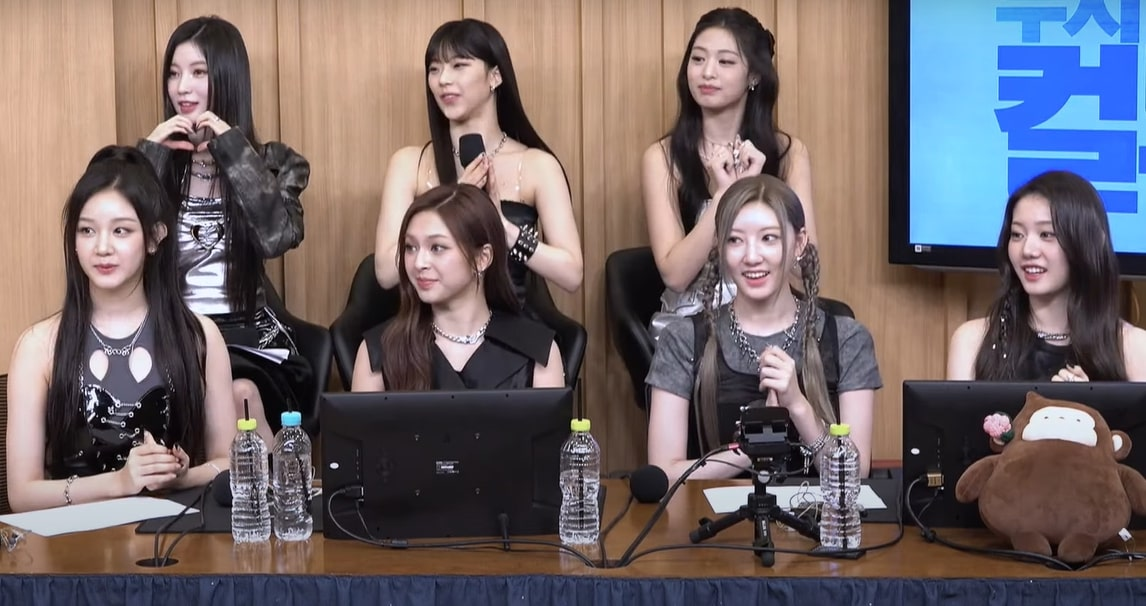
Babymonster promoting "Sheesh" on the radio broadcast Cultwo Show, on April 28, 2024.

Marking the group's official debut, their first extended play (EP) Babymons7er, was released on April 1. It was primarily supported by the titular single "Sheesh", and included re-recordings of "Batter Up" and "Stuck in the Middle" with all seven members. "Like That", a track gifted by Charlie Puth following the viral circulation of Ahyeon's cover of "Dangerously", was also included. The eponymous release received over 460,000 pre-orders, and debuted at number three on the Circle Album Chart. Initially released to lukewarm reception, "Sheesh" experienced a surge in popularity through its live performances, peaking at number ten on the Circle Digital Chart. It also became the highest‑charting entry by a K‑pop girl group on Spotify that year, debuting at number sixty‑nine on the Daily Top Songs Global Chart with 1.76 million streams. To commemorate their debut, a ten‑day pop‑up store at The Hyundai Seoul was held, attracting 2,000 visitors within its first two days. In May, the septet launched their inaugural fan meeting tour, with stops in six Asian territories: Singapore, Japan, Thailand, Taiwan, Indonesia, and South Korea, where they sold 26,000 tickets at their Tokyo stop alone.

For Babymonster's first studio album, a digital single titled "Forever" was pre-released on July 1. Drip followed on November 1, led by the two singles, "Clik Clak" and "Drip". Notably, G-Dragon participated in the composition and demo recording of "Drip", while Mino of Winner co-wrote the album's B-side, "Really Like You". The album marked a new career high for the septet, recording 820,000 orders within one week, and became their first entry on the Billboard 200, debuting at number 149. Its titular single of the same name achieved a new personal best, peaking at number 30 on the Billboard Global 200, and acquired belated traction in South Korea and Japan, following the virality of their live performances on SBS Gayo Daejeon and The First Take. It gave them their second top ten hit on the Circle Digital Chart, their first top thirty entry on the Billboard Japan Hot 100, and their first single to be certified platinum for streaming by the Recording Industry Association of Japan. "Really Like You" likewise received attention after circulating on short‑form platforms such as YouTube and TikTok, topping YouTube's Viral 50 Music Chart for five consecutive days from January 11–15, 2026. Its popularity translated to favorable results on the Circle Digital Chart, peaking at number 79.

=== 2025–present: First world tour, Rami's hiatus, and career expansion ===
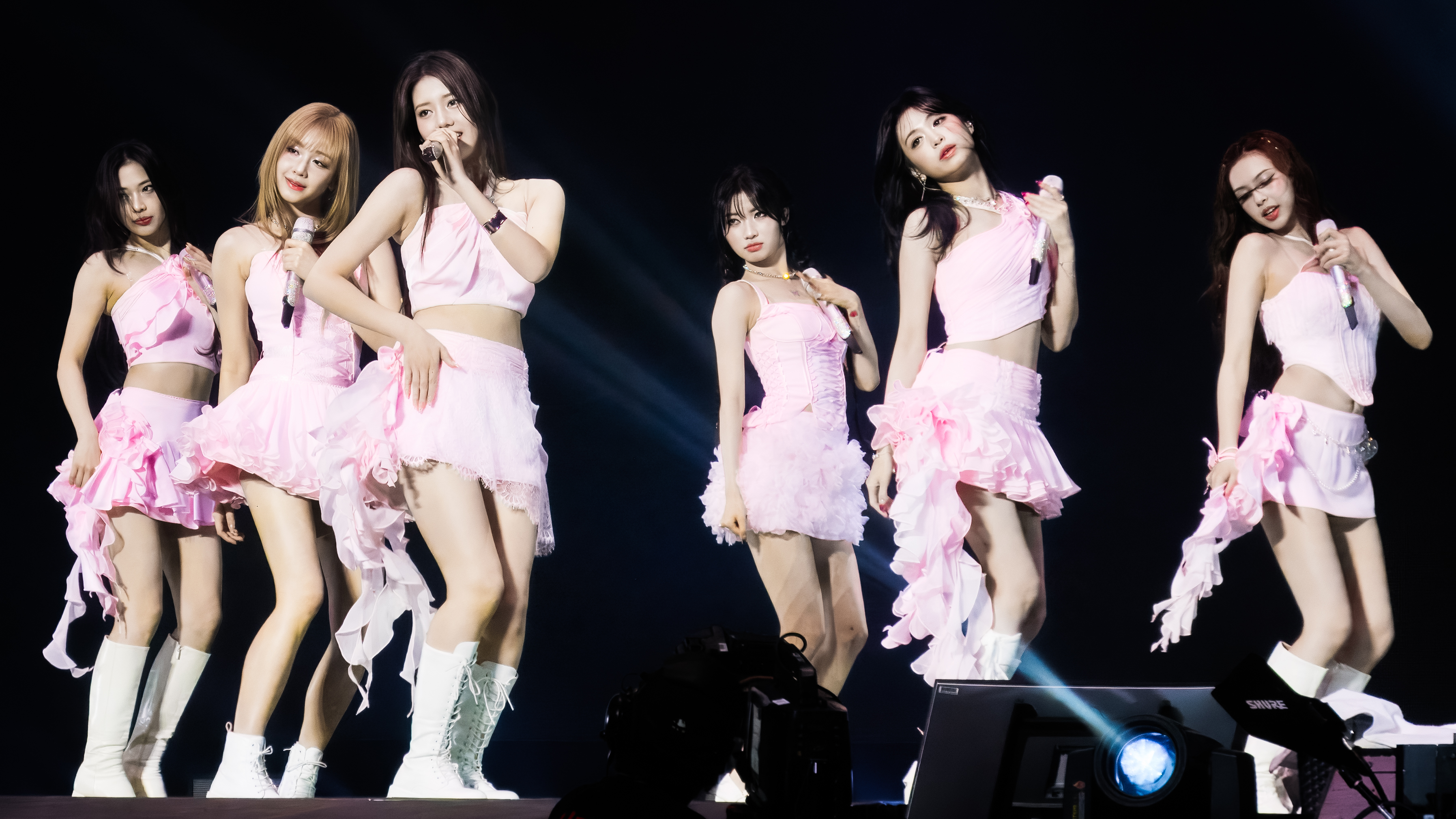
Babymonster performing at the Climate Pledge Arena in Seattle on September 12, 2025.

From January 25–26, 2025, Babymonster held a two-day concert at KSPO Dome in Seoul, the onset to their first world tour Hello Monsters, which comprised two legs across Asia and North America. The seven-piece became the fastest female act to headline the venue, achieving the milestone within eight months of their debut. Following demand in North America, which included shows in Newark and Los Angeles, six additional dates were added in the region. In Japan, all 100,000 tickets for the initial dates sold out, prompting the opening of restricted view seats and additional shows to accommodate to demand; it attracted 150,000 attendees across ten concerts in the country, setting a record pace for a K-pop girl group. The remaining Asia leg covered seven markets—Singapore, Hong Kong, Vietnam, Thailand, Indonesia, Malaysia, and Taiwan—and drew a further 100,000 attendees across ten sold‑out shows, including an added date in Hong Kong. Rami entered an indefinite health‑related hiatus at the outset of this leg and remained absent for the remainder of the tour. Hello Monsters concluded on September 12, with a cumulative audience of 300,000 across thirty-two shows in twenty cities.

Initially introduced as a piece from a two-part pre-release sequence for their sophomore EP, "Hot Sauce" was ultimately released as a standalone digital single on July 1, recorded by the group's six active members, following Rami's hiatus. The track paid homage to Seo Taiji and Boys' 1992 debut, drawing on late‑1980s hip‑hop influences and incorporating visual references to the trio's original album design, including a logo styled after the debut's typography. We Go Up, a piece cited to reflect each members' artistic aspirations, was released on October 10. The release cycle preceded the ensemble's subsequent fan‑concert tour, Love Monsters, a performance‑driven series positioned between a fan meeting and a regular concert. Held across twelve shows in three countries—including two sold‑out dates at Taipei Arena in Taiwan—the tour concluded on January 3, 2026, and attracted an est. 140,000 attendees, bringing the group's cumulative audience for the year to approximately 440,000.

On May 4, 2026, Babymonster released their third EP titled Choom (Korean: 춤; lit. 'Dance'), led by the single of the same name. The digital single "Sugar Honey Ice Tea" was released on June 8. A world tour dubbed after their EP will commence in Seoul beginning on June 26, followed by new locations in South America, Europe, and Oceania. On October 23, Babymonster released the digital single titled "Deserve" and this marks their first new release in approximately four months. Additionally, General Manager Yang expressed that Babymonster's new album is being prepared step by step with the goal of releasing it early next year.

== Artistry ==
=== Image and reception ===
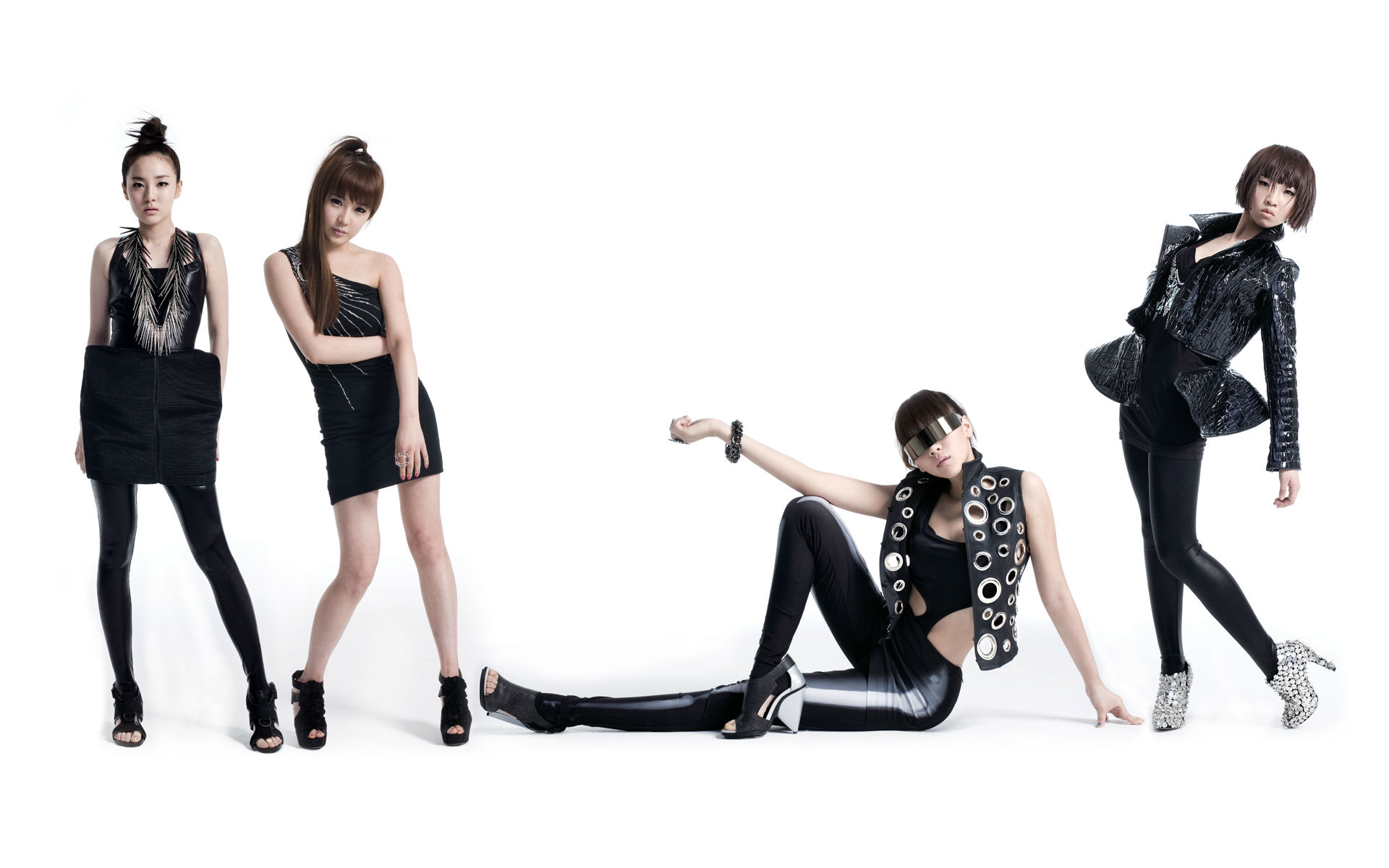
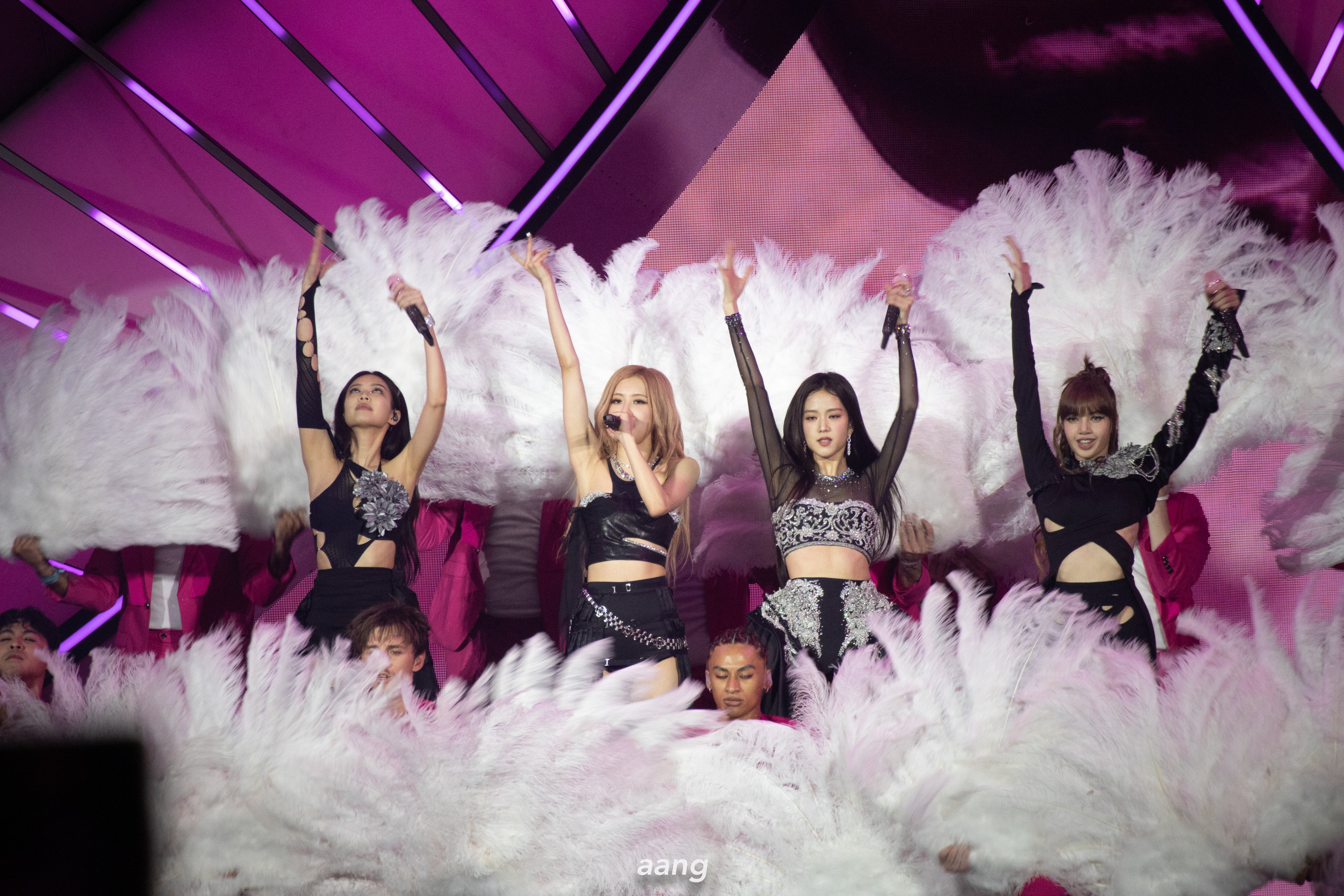
Babymonster's major blueprints include the girl groups 2NE1 (left) and Blackpink (right).

Babymonster's artistic identity was crafted around the duality embedded in their name, pairing an offstage charm with a performance style defined by intensity and precision. They were designed to embody 2NE1's charisma and Blackpink's glamour, conceiving what is often referred to as the "YG DNA", a signature mix of talent, boldness, and distinctive edge. Building on this foundation, the members have been described as "all‑rounders", noted for vocal, rap, and dance abilities, and for foregrounding live performance as a central component of their artistry, distinguishing them from acts that rely on backing tracks to prioritize choreography, fashion, and visuals.

Critical and industry evaluations of Babymonster's early output highlighted a disconnect between the members' well‑regarded abilities and the group's inconsistent conceptual direction. Early singles such as "Batter Up" (2023) and "Stuck in the Middle" (2024) were criticized for dated production, while "Sheesh" (2024) drew comparisons to Blackpink from NME's Carmen Chin despite praise for the B-side "Like That" (2024). The former single and "Drip" (2024), which the group identified as most representative of their color, were later viewed as steps towards establishing a clearer musical identity; however, this momentum slowed with the retro‑styled "Hot Sauce" (2025) and the underperformance of We Go Up (2025). The group's technical strengths, however, remain widely acknowledged, and assessments consistently note that more cohesive conceptual production would position Babymonster to compete more decisively within the emerging fifth‑generation landscape.

=== Musical style and influences ===
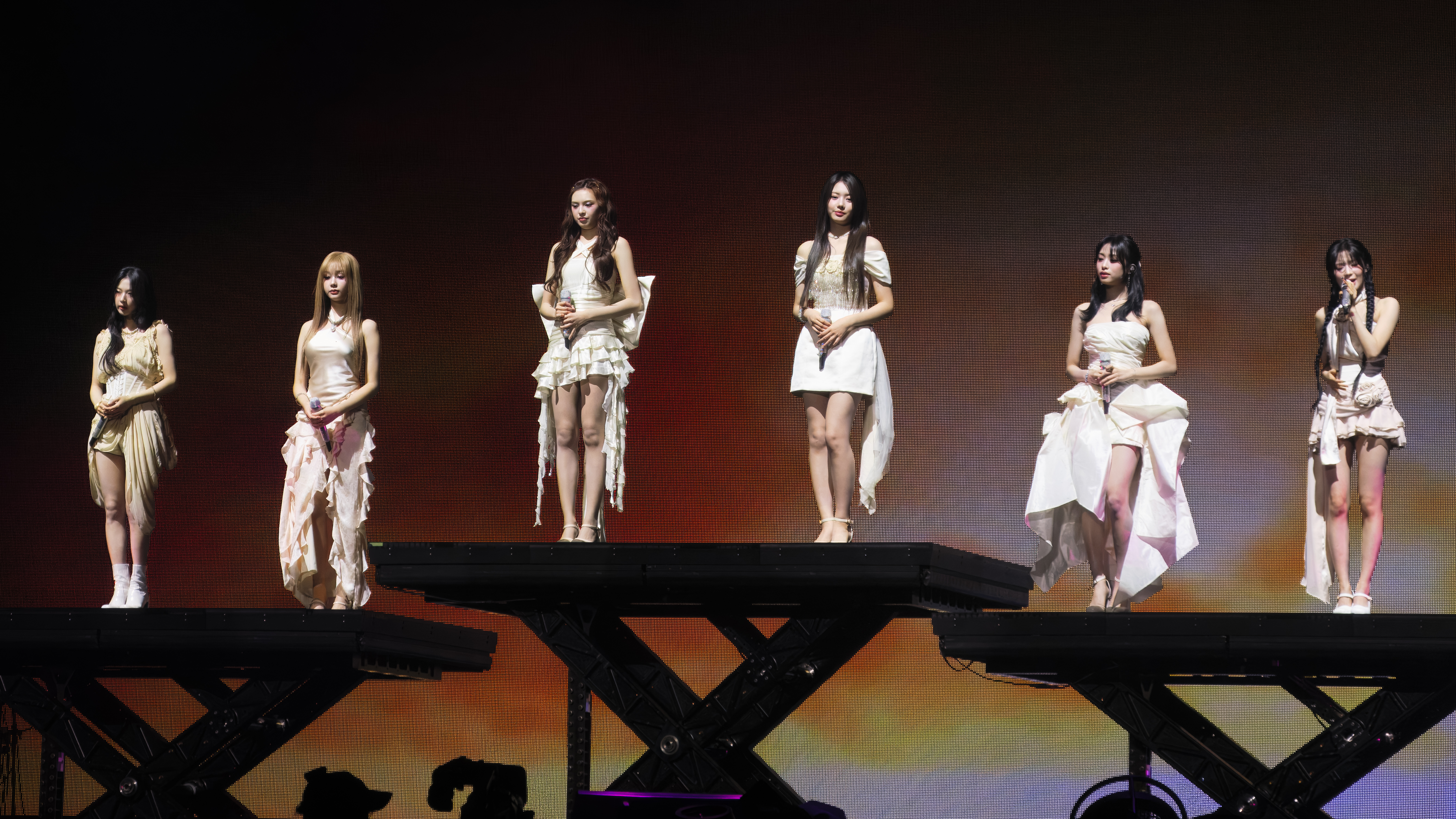
Babymonster performing at the Climate Pledge Arena in Seattle.

Babymonster's musical style is anchored in the hip-hop‑oriented characteristic of their label, while demonstrating a versatility that allows them to adapt across multiple genres. Tracks such as "Drip" (2024) foreground percussive rap delivery and rhythmic bass structures, while "Like That" (2024) adopts a 2000's R&B‑leaning approach. Their ballad‑focused pre‑release "Stuck in the Middle" (2024) highlights the group's emphasis on vocal clarity, while works including "Wild" (2025) integrate a country-inspired dance track.

The group identifies fellow YG Entertainment artists as primary influences, namely drawing inspiration from 2NE1 and Blackpink, whose impact are reflected in Babymonster's live stages.

== Public image ==
Industry professionals began paying attention to the group prior to their debut, where two hundred industry professionals from entertainment companies and broadcasters, film and broadcast content producers, and entertainment reporters ranked the act ninth with Ive as the "Most Anticipated Artist of Late 2021 and 2022" in a survey conducted by JoyNews24. Their official introduction, together with the announcement of G-Dragon's feasible return as a soloist that same day, contributed to a subsequent rise in YG Entertainment's stocks by 11.74%. Following their debut, Babymonster was recognized as one of the "Next Generation Leaders" by Sisa Journal and Gallup Korea, and was named "Future of Music" by Rolling Stone Korea in 2024. In the media, the group have been referred to as the next generation "YouTube Queens", attributed to the viewership and subscribers count they had accumulated on the platform, and have also been identified as a consistent source of high audience engagement in broadcast and live-event contexts, including their appearance at the 2025 MAMA Awards.

== Other ventures ==
=== Endorsements ===
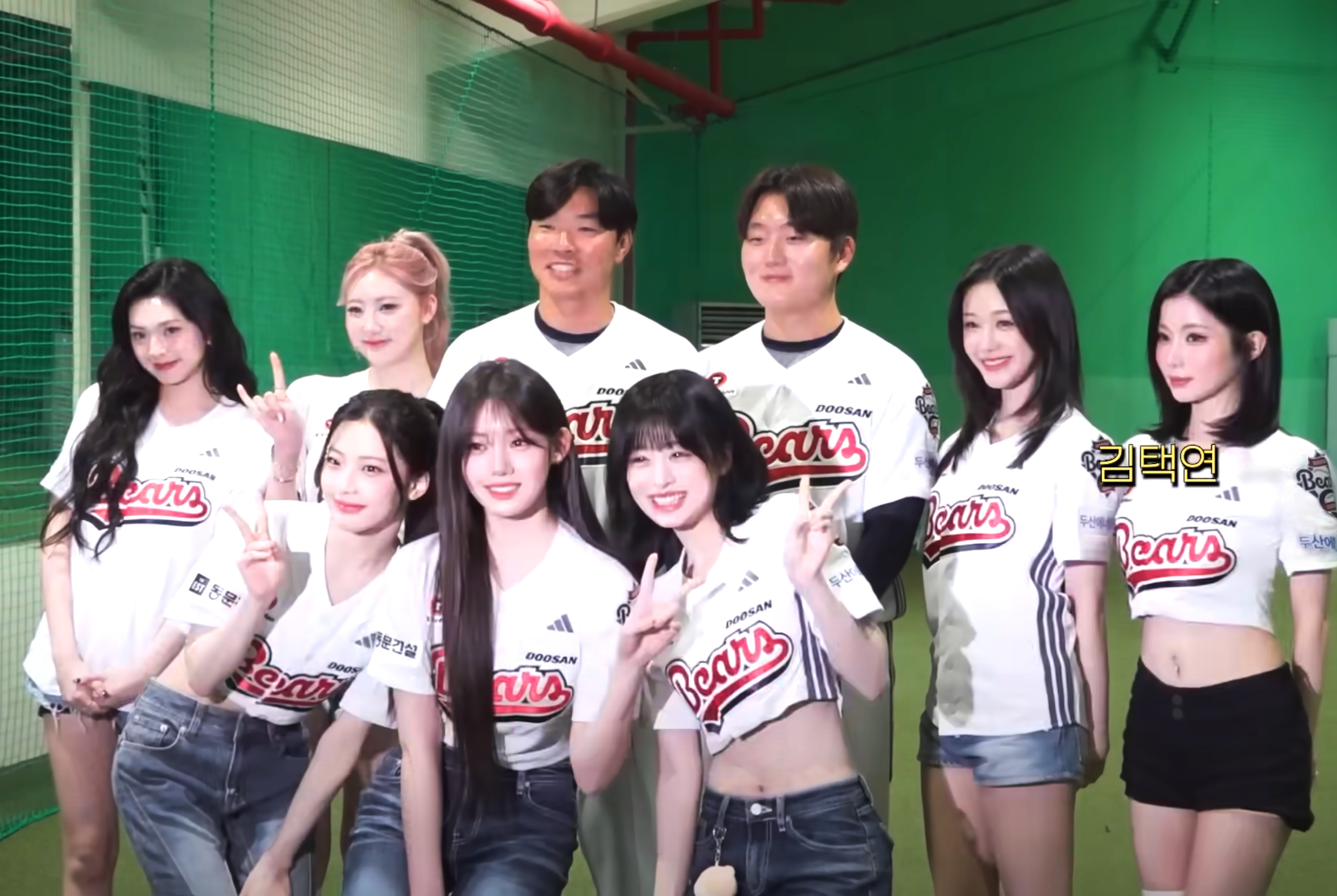
Babymonster with players of Doosan Bears for Adidas in April 2025.

In the advertising industry, Babymonster became a figure that attracts a young customer base. In result, the group became presenters for Pepsi in the Asia-Pacific region, the face of LG Household & Health Care's cosmeceutical brand CNP Laboratory, the muse of LeSportsac Japan, and global partners of Adidas—which they later became ambassadors for. The group also served as endorsement models for Moon Boot, the cosmetics contact lens brand, a-eye, Sunsilk Indonesia, and Oppo's Reno16 series. Furthermore, they were appointed as brand ambassadors for Banila Co., Good Day Latte, and Apee, and collaborated with PUBG Mobile, Google Pixel in Japan, McDonald's in Hong Kong, Oreo in Southeast Asia, and Uniqlo.

=== Philanthropy ===
Since 2024, Babymonster and the Muju YG Foundation have supported charitable initiatives through Naver's Happy Bean, a sustainable online donation platform. They first established a support fund to address child hunger and assist children with disabilities, and subsequently worked with Loving Hands to raise ₩9.9 million to provide winter coats for eighty-five young beneficiaries. Babymonster and YG Entertainment have also donated to nineteen individual campaigns via Happy Bean during the group's first two years, by doubling the cumulative amount raised by the respective campaigns' doners; this includes: ₩11.33 million to World Educational Cultural Aid, and ₩5.36 million to the Korea Leukemia and Childhood Cancer Association.

== Members ==
- Ruka (루카; ルカ)
- Pharita (파리타; ภริตา)
- Asa (아사; アサ)
- Ahyeon (아현)
- Rami (라미)
- Rora (로라)
- Chiquita (치키타; ชิกิต้า)

=== Timeline ===
From November 2023 to April 2024, Ahyeon went on a temporary hiatus prior to their official debut due to health reasons.

Since May 2025, Rami went on an extended hiatus due to medical issues.

== Discography ==
- Drip (2024)

== Filmography ==
- Last Evaluation (2023)
- Baemon House (2025)

== Tours and concerts ==
=== Tours ===
- Hello Monsters World Tour (2025)
- Choom World Tour (2026–2027)
