= Choice37 =

Korean-American musician

- Born: Robin Cho; Los Angeles, California, United States
- Genres: K-pop, Hip hop, R&B
- Occupations: Record producer, songwriter, DJ
- Label: YG
- Formerly of: Longevity Crew

Robin Cho, better known as Choice37, is an American record producer, songwriter, and DJ based in South Korea. He joined YG Entertainment as a producer in 2009, and has since produced songs for K-pop artists including Big Bang, Blackpink, G-Dragon, Ikon, Lee Hi, Treasure, Babymonster.

== Biography ==
Choice37 was born and raised in Los Angeles, California, where he was a member of the hip hop group Longevity Crew. The group released one album, Everything Builds, in 2005. Choice37 also released one solo album, Diligence. In 2008 he moved to South Korea where he was introduced to YG Entertainment CEO Yang Hyun-suk by childhood friend and record producer Teddy Park. Choice37 soon began working for YG, and his song, "Butterfly," performed by G-Dragon, was released in 2009.

== Awards ==
Year	Award	Category	Result	Ref.
2013	Rhythmer Awards	Producer of The Year	Won	
