= Yang Hyun-suk =

South Korean rapper and record executive (born 1970)

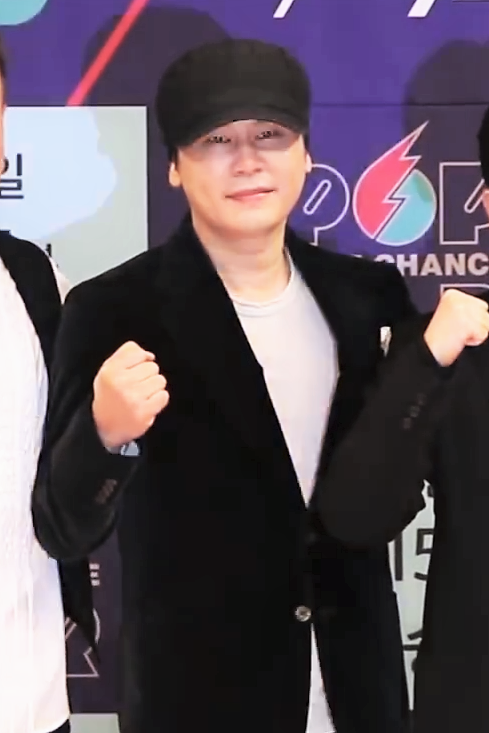
- Yang in 2016
- Born: January 9, 1970 (age 56); Seoul, South Korea
- Other name: YG
- Occupations: Entrepreneur; Record executive; rapper; singer; dancer; record producer
- Known for: Co-founding YG Entertainment
- Spouse: Lee Eun-ju (m. 2010)
- Children: 2
- Musical career
- Genres: K-pop; hip hop
- Instruments: Vocals; drums
- Years active: 1992–2019; 2023–present
- Label: YG Entertainment
- Formerly of: Seo Taiji and Boys
- Website: yanggoon.com

Korean name
- Hangul: 양현석
- Hanja: 梁鉉錫
- RR: Yang Hyeonseok
- MR: Yang Hyŏnsŏk

Yang Hyun-suk (Korean: 양현석; born January 9, 1970) is a South Korean music executive, rapper, singer, dancer, songwriter, and record producer. He rose to fame as a member of Seo Taiji and Boys during the 1990s. After the group disbanded, he founded and became the executive producer and chairman of YG Entertainment, the fourth-largest record company in South Korea.

== Career ==
=== 1992–1996: Seo Taiji & Boys ===
Seo Taiji & Boys was formed in 1991 with Seo Taiji, Lee Juno and Yang Hyun-seok. Yang said he first met Seo when the musician came to him to learn how to dance when Yang was a dancer (Yang danced in the Korean dance crew "Spark"(which is considered the first Korean breaking dance group) and in the dancing group "Park Nam Jung and friends(박남정과 친구들)"). "Blown away" by his music, Yang offered to join the group and they later recruited Lee who was one of the top dancers in Korea. The group was influential on the Korean music scene, famous for their single, "Nan Arayo" (Korean: "난 알아요", "I Know"). The group received criticism for some of their albums, most notably for the song, "Shidaeyugam" (Korean: 시대유감, "Regret of the Times"), to which fan backlash led to the abolition of the Pre-censorship law in 1996. The group disbanded in 1996 and each member went on to pursue solo careers.

=== 1996–2019: YG Entertainment ===
In 1996, he established YG Entertainment and released his first solo album which featured a song composed by Seo Taiji. This was their first collaboration since the breakup. Yang Hyun-Suk has produced successful artists through his company, most notably Jinusean, 1TYM, Wheesung, Gummy, Seven, Big Bang, 2NE1, Winner, iKon, Tablo, Epik High, Lee Hi, Blackpink, Treasure, BabyMonster, and Psy.

Due to recent controversies involving the Burning Sun scandal and other allegations, Yang Hyun-suk announced his plans to step down from all of his positions at YG Entertainment, and his brother Yang Min-suk announced his decision to resign as CEO of YG Entertainment on June 14, 2019.

=== 2019–present: Conviction and YG return ===
On December 22, 2022, Yang was acquitted of a charge of threatening an informant. On November 8, 2023, his acquittal for threatening the informant was overturned by the Seoul High Court, finding that he had abused his status at the company to coerce trainees into reversing police testimonies. He was sentenced to 6 months in prison, suspended for 1 year. A previous acquittal for blackmail was upheld.

In December 2023, Yang discussed his "deep involvement in every aspect of BabyMonster's production", and how the youth of the members resonated with him because he had a similarly aged daughter. In May 2024, YG Entertainment released a video featuring Yang announcing upcoming plans for BabyMonster and Treasure.

== Personal life ==
Yang began dating former Swi.T and Moogadang member Lee Eun-ju in 2001, and they married in 2010. They have two children together, born in 2010 and 2012.

== Discography ==
=== Albums ===
Title	Album details
Yang Hyun-suk	Released: April 6, 1998; Label: YG Entertainment; Formats: CD, Digital download

== Filmography ==
=== TV Series ===
Year	Title	Role	Notes	Ref.
2009	Superstar K	Himself	Judge	
2011	K-pop Star season 1	Himself	Judge for YG Entertainment	
2012	K-pop Star 2	Himself	Judge for YG Entertainment	
2013	K-pop Star 3	Himself	Judge for YG Entertainment	
2013	Win: Who Is Next?	Himself	YG Entertainment CEO, Director	
2014	Mix & Match	Himself	YG Entertainment CEO, Director	
2014	K-pop Star 4	Himself	Judge for YG Entertainment	
2015	K-pop Star 5	Himself	Judge for YG Entertainment	
2016	K-pop Star 6: The Last Chance	Himself	Judge for YG Entertainment	
2017	Mix Nine	Himself	Judge	
2018	YG Future Strategy Office	Himself	Recurring character	
2018	YG Treasure Box	Himself	Judge	

== Accolades ==
=== Awards ===
The name of the award ceremony, year presented, award category, nominee(s) of the award, and the result of the award
Award ceremony	Year	Category	Nominee / work	Result	Ref.
Gaon Chart Music Awards	2013	Producer of the Year	Yang Hyun-suk	Won	
Gaon Chart Music Awards	2014	Producer of the Year	Yang Hyun-suk	Won	
Gaon Chart Music Awards	2016	Producer of the Year	Yang Hyun-suk	Won	
SBS Gayo Daejeon	2003	Record Producer of the Year	Yang Hyun-suk	Won	

=== State honors ===
Name of country or organization, year given, and name of honor
Country or organization	Year	Honor	Ref.
Korea Brain Research Institute	2013	Korea's Representative Power Brain	
South Korea (Note: Honors are given at the Korean Popular Culture and Arts Awards, arranged by the Korea Creative Content Agency and hosted by the Ministry of Culture, Sports and Tourism. They are awarded to those who have contributed to the arts and South Korea's pop culture.)	2011	Presidential Commendation	

=== Listicles ===
Name of publisher, year listed, name of listicle, and placement
Publisher	Year	Listicle	Placement	Ref.
Billboard	2014	International Power Players	Placed	
Golden Disc Awards	2025	Golden Disc Powerhouse 40	Placed	
