= Shining Solo =

South Korean reality dating television program

- Promotional poster
- Hangul: 빛 나는 Solo
- RR: Bit naneun Solo
- MR: Pit nanŭn Solo
- Genre: Reality television; Dating show
- Written by: Park Hyun-hee; Kim Yu-ri; Lee Sun-hye; Eom Yun-jeong; Lee Hye-rin; Jeong Bo-hee; Lee Ui-jin; Hwang Hee-jeong
- Presented by: Treasure
- Narrated by: Yoo In-na
- Opening theme: "Come to Me" by Treasure
- Country of origin: South Korea
- Original language: Korean
- No. of episodes: 10

Production
- Executive producer: Park Mi-yeon
- Production location: South Korea
- Running time: 80 minutes

Original release
- Network: SBS
- Release: March 3 – May 5, 2024

Shining Solo (Korean: 빛 나는 Solo) is a South Korean reality television show in the format of a dating show revolved around the members of K-pop boy band Treasure and a cast of female individuals. It was broadcast on SBS on March 3, 2024, and is simultaneously aired on OTT platforms in Japan, Taiwan, and Thailand. It is also available for streaming on Wavve in South Korea and on Viki and YouTube in selected regions.

== Overview ==
Shining Solo adds to the list of self-produced content created by YG Entertainment and K-pop boy band Treasure, paired with South Korean broadcasting channel SBS. It embodies the format of a dating show, wherein members of the band split into two groups of five and appeal their charms to the female participants over the course of four days amidst their stay at the "Treasure Castle". At midnight, the members are evaluated by the female cast through jewels and voice recorders to earn the title "Mr. Treasure", a term for the most popular member.

| Part | Episodes | Originally aired | | Treasure members | Time slot (KST) | Ref. |
| Part | Episodes | First aired | Last aired | Treasure members | Time slot (KST) | Ref. |
|---|---|---|---|---|---|---|
| 1 | 5 | March 3, 2024 | March 31, 2024 | Jihoon, Junkyu, Yoon Jae-hyuk, Asahi, Haruto | Sunday 12:30 | |
| 2 | 5 | April 7, 2024 | May 5, 2024 | Choi Hyun-suk, Yoshi, Doyoung, Park Jeong-woo, So Jung-hwan | Sunday 12:30 | |

== Cast ==
=== Part 1 ===
List of female cast members

| Name | Korean age | Notes | Ref. |
|---|---|---|---|
| Lee Ji-yeon (이지연) | 1999 (age 25) | College student; Works as an actress and model | |
| Hong Ju-hee (홍주희) | 2000 (age 24) | Nursing major at Yonsei University; Appeared from episode 3 onward | |
| Lee So-won (이소원) | 2001 (age 23) | Canadian nationality; Works as an actress | |
| Jo Hyun-seo (조현서) | 2001 (age 23) | Clothing major at Seoul National University; Appeared from episode 3 onward | |
| Yoo Mi-ho (유미호) | 2003 (age 21) | Works as an actress | |
| Kim Ye-won (김예원) | 2004 (age 20) | K Plus model; Starred in Romance Before Debut (로맨스는 데뷔 전에) | |

=== Part 2 ===
List of female cast members

| Name | Korean age | Notes | Ref. |
|---|---|---|---|
| Lee Ha-yul | —N/a | —N/a | |
| Han Seung-ji | —N/a | —N/a | |
| Lee Min-ye | —N/a | Studied Chinese at Seoul National University; On leave from Law school; Appeared from episode 7 onward | |
| Jo Min-ji | 1999 (age 25) | Works as a ballet instructor and K Plus model; Studied ballet at Hanyang University | |
| Park Ji-soo | 2001 (age 23) | Studies Korean dance at Korean National University of Arts | |

== Reception ==
=== Critical response ===
With the rarity of idol-produced content including the opposite gender due to K-pop fans placing themselves into parasocial relationships with the idols they support, Shining Solo sparked displeasure from such fans in Korea prior to its airing, expressing: "It makes no sense for an idol to appear on a dating show" and "I don't necessarily wish to see an idol with someone of the opposite gender". Its first episode earned a rating of 0.5% (based on Nielsen Korea) due to its late time slot and the domestic fandoms' reaction; however, its virality in Korean community sites piqued favorable reviews from the public recording a viewership of 1% by the sixth episode.

Shining Solo was commended for breaking walls within the industry and setting an exemplary method to display boundaries in idol fandoms. It particularly attained positive response from the international audience. Its success in Japan allowed the series to expand on eight additional streaming platforms, including Amazon Prime Video.

=== Viewership ===
Shining Solo ranked first on Lemino following its premiere and received warm reception, quickly spreading by word of mouth. It recorded the highest daily viewed content amidst all K-pop variety productions in its history, and soon ranked first for four consecutive weeks, maintaining a high amount of views on the platform. In Korea, the show received attention on social media after it aired, and found success in Taiwan and Thailand competing against local content. Shining Solo ranked first on Thai OTT platform OneD's entertainment category for four consecutive weeks, and seventh in its overall category by the third week. In Taiwan, the series placed first on friDay Video's entertainment category.

Average TV viewership ratings (audience share)
| Ep. no. | Original broadcast date | Nationwide (Nielsen Korea) |
|---|---|---|
| 1 | March 3, 2024 | 0.5% |
| 2 | March 10, 2024 | 0.7% |
| 3 | March 17, 2024 | 0.6% |
| 4 | March 24, 2024 | 0.5% |
| 5 | March 31, 2024 | 0.4% |
| 6 | April 7, 2024 | 1.0% |
| 7 | April 14, 2024 | 0.5% |
| 8 | April 21, 2024 | 0.7% |
| 9 | April 28, 2024 | 0.4% |
| 10 | May 5, 2024 | 0.5% |
In the table above, the blue numbers represent the lowest ratings and the red numbers represent the highest ratings.
