= Reboot (Treasure album) =

2023 studio album by Treasure

- Digital cover

Studio album by Treasure
- Released: July 28, 2023
- Recorded: 2023
- Studio: YG (Seoul)
- Genres: K-pop; hip-hop; funk; R&B
- Length: 32:56
- Language: Korean
- Labels: YG; Columbia
- Producers: Choice37; Dee.P; P.K.; Rovin

Treasure chronology
Here I Stand (2023)	Reboot (2023)	Treasure Japan Tour 2022–23 ~Hello~ Special in Kyocera Dome Osaka (2023)

Singles from Reboot
- 1. "Move" Released: June 28, 2023; 2. "Bona Bona" Released: July 28, 2023

Reboot is the second studio album from the South Korean boy band Treasure, released on July 28, 2023, by YG Entertainment and Columbia Records. The album consists of 10 tracks and was supported by the pre-release single "Move" and the lead single "Bona Bona".

== Background and release ==
On June 12, 2023, in a video posted on Treasure's official YouTube channel, YG Entertainment's founder Yang Hyun-suk announced a "reboot" project for Treasure, which included plans for a second studio album, and the creation of the first Treasure sub-unit, T5, which would participate in pre-release promotions prior to the release of the second studio album. The members of T5, So Jung-hwan, Junkyu, Jihoon, Yoon Jae-hyuk, and Doyoung, were revealed through concept photos posted online. On June 19, YG Entertainment announced that T5 would debut with the track "Move," and revealed the dance practice video for "Move" would be released on June 21, a week before T5's official debut as a special promotional strategy. On June 28, "Move" was released on streaming platforms, alongside the music video, a week after the dance practice video was posted.

On July 3, YG Entertainment cemented an official partnership with Columbia Records to support the band's album promotion for the North American market. The following day, YG Entertainment confirmed through an announcement film that Treasure would be having a full group comeback with their second studio album, Reboot, on July 28. On July 17, YG Entertainment released the track list for Reboot, revealing 10 new songs, including the pre-release T5 single "Move," and "Bona Bona," the latter serving as the title track for the album. On July 26, the first music video teaser for "Bona Bona" was released. On July 27, the second music video teaser for "Bona Bona" was released. The album and its lead single was released globally on the following day.

== Composition ==
During a morning press conference on the day of the album's release, co-leader Jihoon spoke to the reporters that the band took the name "reboot" literally and commented, "We wanted to show you a newer side that has come with members’ maturity both in our minds and looks." Choi Hyun-suk also added that the album features every genre from K-pop and hip-hop to ballad.

The album begins with lead single "Bona Bona", an upbeat dance-pop song conveying the words "born to love you." The production process of the song involved YG's in-house producers and record producers from overseas. Upon hearing the track for the first time, Doyoung immediately called it as the title track.

Pre-release single "Move" was performed by the group's T5 sub-unit consisting of Junkyu, Jihoon, Yoon Jae-hyuk, Doyoung, and So Jung-hwan. The lyric of this dance-pop song is penned solely by Junkyu, marking the first time he is credited as the lyricist. He collaborated with YG producer Dee.P for the music, also crediting him as the composer. The song featured rhythmic bass and synth sounds and catchy hooks with a talk box.

"G.O.A.T" is a hip-hop song performed by the group's vocal unit consisting of Choi Hyun-suk, Haruto, and Yoshi. During the behind-the-scenes video of the song's production, Choi joked that the group is not the greatest of all time yet, and he needed someone for the song. Out of the blue, he contacted Lee Young-hyun of Big Mama, who agreed to be featured.

== Promotion ==
Treasure embarked on their second Asia Tour with the same name as the album from December 2023 to June 2024 promote the album.

== Track listing ==
Reboot track listing
No.	Title	Lyrics	Music	Arrangement	Length
1.	"Bona Bona"	Lee Chan-hyuk; Junkyu; Choi Hyun-suk; Yoshi; Haruto; Where the Noise; Jared Lee; Dan Whittenmore	Kang Uk-jin; Diggy; Dee.P; Jared Lee; Dan Whittemore; Where the Noise	YG; Dee.P	3:32
2.	"I Want Your Love"	Junkyu; Choi Hyun-suk; Haruto; Ludwig Lindell (Caesar & Loui); Jared Lee	Kang Uk-jin; Diggy; Dee.P; Ludwig Lindell (Caesar & Loui); Jared Lee; Junkyu	Dee.P; Kang Uk-jin; Diggy	3:08
3.	"Run"	Lil G; Sonny; Choice37; LP, Hae; Choi Hyun-suk; Yoshi; Haruto	Choice37; LP; Hae; Sonny; Lil G; Choi Hyun-suk; Yoshi; Haruto	Choice37; LP; Hae	3:30
4.	"Move" (T5)	Junkyu	Junkyu; Dee.P	YG; Dee.P	3:28
5.	"G.O.A.T" (Rap Unit; featuring Lee Young-hyun)	Choi Hyun-suk; Yoshi; Haruto	Dee.P; Choi Hyun-suk; Yoshi; Haruto	Dee.P	3:02
6.	"Stupid" (멍청이; Meongcheongi)	Yoshi; Choi Hyun-suk; Haruto	Yoshi; Kang Uk-jin	Kang Uk-jin	3:00
7.	"The Way To" (어른; Eoreun; 'Adult') (Vocal Unit)	Rovin	Bekuh Boom; Dee.P; P.K; Rovin	Dee.P; Rovin	3:28
8.	"Wonderland"	Lee Chan-hyuk; Choi Hyun-suk; Yoshi; Haruto; Junkyu	Lee Chan-hyuk; Kim Seung-ho; Kwon Myung-hwan; Dee.P; Junkyu	Dee.P; Kim Seung-ho; Kwon Myung-hwan	2:58
9.	"B.O.M.B"	Junkyu; P.K; Yoshi; Haruto	P.K; Junkyu; Noerio (The Hub); AFTRSHOK; Brian U (The Hub)	P.K	3:21
10.	"Lovesick" (병; Byeong; 'Sickness')	Asahi; Haruto; Choi Hyun-suk; Yoshi	Asahi; Dee.P	Dee.P	3:24
Total length:					32:56

== Charts ==
=== Weekly charts ===
Weekly chart performance for Reboot
Chart (2023)	Peak position
Japanese Albums (Oricon)	1
Japanese Combined Albums (Oricon)	1
Japanese Hot Albums (Billboard Japan)	1
South Korean Albums (Circle)	1
US Top Album Sales (Billboard)	61

=== Monthly charts ===
Monthly chart performance for Reboot
Chart (2023)	Position
Japanese Albums (Oricon)	4
South Korean Albums (Circle)	2

=== Year-end charts ===
2023 year-end chart performance for Reboot
Chart (2023)	Position
Japanese Albums (Oricon)	22
Japanese Hot Albums (Billboard Japan)	17
South Korean Albums (Circle)	16

2024 year-end chart performance for Reboot
Chart (2024)	Position
Japanese Albums (Oricon)	24
Japanese Hot Albums (Billboard Japan)	18

2025 year-end chart performance for Reboot
Chart (2025)	Position
Japanese Albums (Oricon)	99
Japanese Top Albums Sales (Billboard Japan)	99

== Certifications ==
Certifications for Reboot
Region	Certification	Certified units/sales
Japan (RIAJ) Physical	2× Platinum	500,000^{^}
South Korea (KMCA)	Million	1,000,000^{^}
^{^} Shipments figures based on certification alone.

== Release history ==
Release history for Reboot
Region	Date	Format	Label	Ref.
Various	July 28, 2023	Digital download; streaming	YG; YG Plus	
South Korea	July 28, 2023	CD; KiT Player	YG; YG Plus	
United States	July 28, 2023	CD	Columbia	
Japan	July 28, 2023	CD	YGEX	
