= Move (T5 song) =

- Korean version cover (Note: The Japanese version of the single featured the same cover but with the words of "Move (T5) JP ver." below the Treasure logo.)

Single by T5

from the album Reboot
- Language: Korean; Japanese
- Released: June 28, 2023
- Recorded: 2023
- Studio: YG (Seoul)
- Genre: Dance-pop
- Length: 3:28
- Label: YG; Columbia; YGEX
- Composers: Dee.P; Kim Jun-kyu
- Lyricist: Kim Jun-kyu
- Producers: Dee.P; Kim Jun-kyu

Treasure singles chronology
"Here I Stand" (2022)	"Move" (2023)	"Bona Bona" (2023)

Music video
- "Move" on YouTube
- "Move (Japanese version)" on YouTube

"Move" is a song recorded by T5, a subgroup of the South Korean boy band Treasure. It was released on June 28, 2023, by YG Entertainment and was distributed by YG Plus in South Korea and by YGEX for the Japanese version. The song was released as the pre-release single for Treasure's second studio album, Reboot. Member Junkyu was credited as the producer for the first time since his debut.

== Background ==
On June 12, 2023, YG posted "The Next Plan for Treasure" in their official blog where the agency's founder, Yang Hyun-suk announced via a video that Treasure will be releasing an album soon. In the same announcement, he announced that Treasure will debut a five-member unit called T5. Yang stated that T5 will feature "the five handsome members" of the full group.

On June 13, member So Jung-hwan is the first Treasure member to revealed as a member of the subgroup. The following day on June 14, concept photo of the second member Junkyu is revealed in which he stood in front of a dark background. The third member to revealed is Jihoon on June 15 with a wet hair styling and silvery accessories. On June 16, penultimate member Yoon Jae-hyuk is revealed showing him wearing a black jacket and a white shirt. The final member of the lineup is Doyoung through the last concept photo on June 17.

On June 19, it was announced that the subgroup would debut through a single called "Move" and it was revealed on the credit poster that member Junkyu has taken part in a record production for the first time. Two days later, YG uploaded a practice video of the song. On June 22, YG announced that the subgroup will debut earlier on June 28, as opposed to the original plan in July and will begin promoting the song on weekly music shows. Two days before the release of the song, YG uploaded a behind-the-scenes video of the song's choreography. Junkyu stated that the choreography is "a little different from what we've shown before."

On June 28, "Move" and its accompanying music video is officially released digitally online.

== Composition and lyrics ==
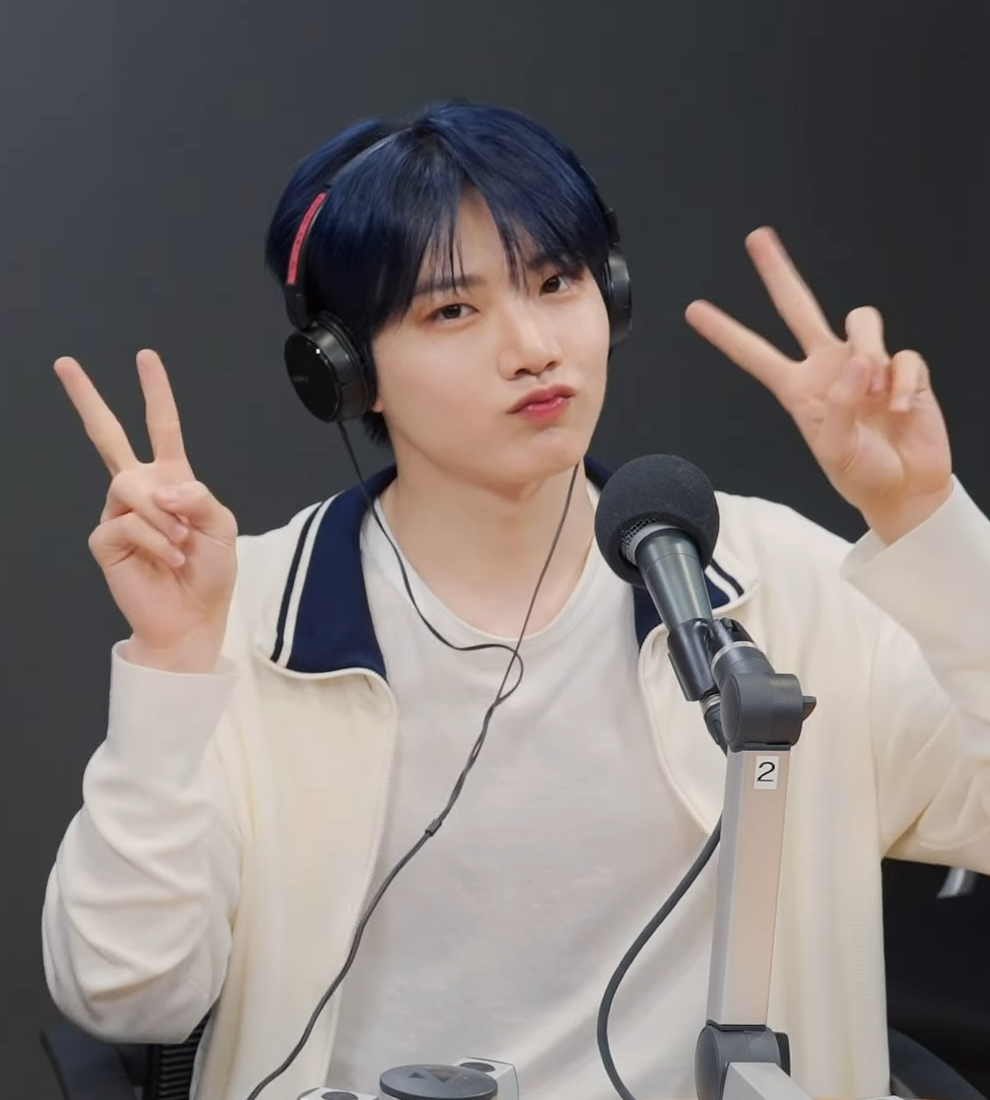
"Move" is the first song where Junkyu gets production credits

"Move" is described as a dance-pop song with rhythmic bass and strong synth sounds by co-producer Junkyu. It was co-composed and co-produced with YG's in-house record producer, Dee.P, who arranged the song with Yang Hyun-suk. Junkyu revealed in an interview with The Dong-a Ilbo that "Move" is meant to be "groovy" and "full of energy", albeit not overly intense nor too relaxed. It is composed in the key of B Major, with the tempo of 95 beats per minute.

The lyrics of the song was entirely penned by Junkyu himself. Jihoon introduced the song as a "different picture" of Treasure, while Doyoung added that the song highlighted the members' charm and stated that he discovered a new side of him through the song.

== Music video ==
The music video was released on June 28. It shows the T5 members dancing to the song and finding their groove. The behind-the-scenes of the music video was released on July 1.

== Commercial performance ==
"Move" peaked at number 162 at the Circle Digital Chart and number 56 at the Billboard Japan Hot 100.

== Promotion and live performances ==
T5 began promoting "Move" by an appearance in MBC's Show! Music Core on July 1. On the next day, the subgroup made an appearance on Inkigayo. The song was later included in the group's second headlining tour, "Reboot Tour".

== Charts ==
=== Weekly charts ===
Chart performance for "Move"
Chart (2023)	Peak position
Japan Hot 100 (Billboard Japan)	56
South Korea (Circle)	162

== Credits and personnel ==
Credits adapted from the album's liner notes.

Studio

- YG Studio – recording, digital editing, mixing
- The Mastering Palace – mastering
- Sterling Sound – mastering

Personnel

- YG Entertainment – executive producer
- Yang Hyun-suk – producer, arranger
- Dee.P – producer, composer, arranger
- T5 – vocals
  - Kim Jun-kyu – producer, Korean lyrics, composer
- Zero (Yves & Adams) – Japanese lyrics
- Ta-Trow – Japanese lyrics
- Jason Roberts – mixing
- Dave Kutch – mastering
- Chris Gehringer – mastering

== Release history ==
Release history for "Move"
Region	Date	Version	Format	Label	Ref
Various	June 28, 2023	Korean	Digital download; streaming	YG; YG Plus	
United States	July 28, 2023	Korean	Digital download; streaming	Columbia	
Various	September 16, 2023	Japanese	Digital download; streaming	YGEX	
