= Only One (EP) =

- Digital cover

EP by Bang Ye-dam
- Released: November 23, 2023
- Recorded: August–September 2023
- Studios: Studio505 (Seoul); Studio DdeepKICK (Seoul)
- Genre: Pop
- Length: 19:15
- Language: Korean
- Labels: GF; WMK
- Producers: Bang Ye-dam; Jaydope; Krap; MiGO; ONAIR

Bang Ye-dam chronology
Only One (2023)	Good Vibes (2024)

Singles from Only One
- 1. "Miss You" Released: November 10, 2023; 2. "Only One" Released: November 23, 2023

Music videos
- "Miss You" on YouTube
- "Only One" on YouTube
- "Come to Me" on YouTube

Only One is the debut EP by South Korean singer, songwriter, and producer Bang Ye-dam. It was released through GF Entertainment and distributed by Warner Music Korea on November 23, 2023. The album consists of songs primarily written by Bang himself. The EP is preceded by the release of "Miss You" as a pre-release single on November 10, 2023, before lead single, "Only One" was released on November 23, the same day as the album. The EP is Bang's first musical release following his hiatus after departing Treasure and YG Entertainment on November 8, 2022.

The EP peaked at number 7 in the Circle Album Chart with over 57,000 copies sold.

== Background ==
Bang's musical journey kicked-off after auditioning for K-Pop Star 2 in 2012 where he finished runner-up behind siblings duo AKMU. In 2013, he signed with YG Entertainment along with AKMU. Over the course of the decade, Bang participated in various trainee activities representing YG Entertainment, including his television debut with Stray Kids in 2017 and was reported to make his full musical debut the following year.

In November 2018, Bang participated in the reality survival program YG Treasure Box where he placed first overall among the vocal team. The group would eventually be named Treasure.

On May 29, 2020, YG Entertainment announced that Bang would make his solo debut by releasing the digital single "Wayo" on June 5. Label-mates Kang Seung-yoon (Winner) and Lee Chan-hyuk (AKMU) were involved in the song's production. The single did not carry out any broadcasting promotions due to his upcoming preparations for debut with Treasure. Despite the lack of promotions, the digital single peaked at number 10 on the Billboard World Digital Songs chart and entered the top 100 at number 98 on the Billboard Korea K-Pop Hot 100 chart.

After training with YG Entertainment for seven years, Bang debuted as a member of Treasure on August 7, through the release of their single album, The First Step: Chapter One with lead single "Boy".

Three months after the release of The Second Step: Chapter One in February 2022, YG Entertainment announced Bang's hiatus from the group to focus on exploring his music and prospects as a music producer. In the process, he was not included in the production of The Second Step: Chapter Two which was released that October. Bang then parted ways with YG Entertainment and Treasure on November 8, 2022.

On August 24, 2023, Bang signed an exclusive contract with GF Entertainment as soloist and producer. Shortly after on October 30, the agency announced that Bang would release his first EP, Only One on November 23.

Pre-release single "Miss You" was digitally released on November 10 alongside its music video which was directed by Lee Sa-gang of Zanybros. The EP was released alongside its lead single on November 23.

== Composition ==
"I've always wanted to compose and write the lyrics for my own songs. For that, I am at the happiest moment as a solo artist as I get to express my music to the public"

— Bang recounting on the production process of Only One.

Only One consists of six songs all written and produced by Bang himself. Labeled as a "pop" album by Bang himself, the decision to choose the genre was to make music and lyrics that anyone can relate with. During an interview with JTBC, Bang explained that the album's recording process had only started around one or two months before the EP's release as most of the songs were already written prior. Initially, he had written as much as 30 songs before only six that made the final cut. Bang later explain the love theme of the EP, "The album itself is about love. It's a mix of different emotions when you start to fall in love, and depending on the listener, the parts I want to express may hit them differently."

In an interview with Newsis, Bang explained that the EP's name "Only One", was selected as the words correctly depict his vision of producing his own music and that words fit his future as a soloist. Later on, he explained the difficulties of producing a music as a team during his time in YG Entertainment. But nonetheless, he credits his former agency and his former band as "nourishing" and played a big part to find his own music color. Bang states that he is hopeful for the EP's success, stating, "The album is well-balanced, not too popular, nor too artistic".

The EP begins with its titular track, "Only One", a neo soul with its lyrics describing the heart of someone in love in a rhythmic and groovy way. The song was unanimously voted as the titular track by Bang and the director of GF Entertainment. The second track, "Hebeolle" is described as a bouncy song that aims to amuse the singer and the listener. "Come to Me" is the third track of the album that was named as Bang's favorite track from the EP. The lyrics expressed his regret and narrating a story that he wants to tell the fans. The fourth track is the alternative rock version of pre-release single, "Miss You". "Not at All" expresses the singer's determination not to be shaken after a breakup. The album concludes with the original piano ballad version of "Miss You".

== Promotion ==
The first promotional activities of the EP began with the release of pre-release single, "Miss You" which was first teased on November 6 in a 32-second video released on Bang's YouTube channel where he played a piano while belting out powerful balladic vocals. The song was released digitally on November 10 alongside its music video. On November 17, Bang released a 32-second teaser video for "Only One", before its release on November 23.

=== Live performances ===
Bang promoted the EP by appearing on music programs before the release of the EP. He performed "Miss You" on M! Countdown on November 16 and Music Bank on November 24. He performed "Only One" on Music Bank on November 23, on Show! Music Core on November 25, and Inkigayo on November 26.

=== Tour ===
In May 2024, GF Entertainment announced that Bang will embark on his first Asia tour, "Be Your D" to further promote the EP starting from June until August with the first stop in Manila. Along the way it will visit countries such as Thailand, Taiwan, and Indonesia.

== Critical reception ==
Indonesian news portal, Detik.com gave the EP a positive review as it showcases Bang's effort in producing music.

== Track listing ==
Only One track listing
No.	Title	Lyrics	Music	Arrangement	Length
1.	"Only One" (하나만 해; hanaman hae; lit. 'Just do one')	Bang Ye-dam	Bang Ye-dam; Kim Min-gu; Lee Ye-jun; Choi Woo-jeong	Bang Ye-dam; Kim Min-gu; Lee Ye-jun; Choi Woo-jeong	3:10
2.	"Hebeolle" (헤벌레; hebeolle; lit. 'Heberle')	Bang; Q; E.Nee	Bang; Q; E.Nee	Bang; Q; E.Nee	3:20
3.	"Come to Me"	Bang	Bang; Migo; Jaydope; Krap; ONAIR	Bang; Migo; Jaydope; Krap; ONAIR	3:10
4.	"Miss You" (Alternative Rock version)	Bang	Bang; Rohan	Bang; Rohan	3:06
5.	"Not at All" (하나두; hanadu; lit. 'One two')	Bang; Q	Bang; Q	Bang; Q	3:23
6.	"Miss You" (Piano version)	Bang; Guava; Josh McClelland	Bang; Rohan	Bang; Rohan	3:06
Total length:					19:15

== Commercial performance ==
Only One debuted and peaked at number 7 on the Circle Chart's Album Chart. The EP achieved its best ranking on the monthly Album Chart by placing 23rd.

=== Sales ===
According to Circle Chart, the EP sold 57,182 copies as of December 2023 in South Korea.

== Charts ==
=== Weekly charts ===
Weekly chart performance for Only One
Chart (2023)	Peak position
South Korean Albums (Circle)	7

=== Monthly charts ===
Monthly chart performance for Only One
Chart (2023)	Position
South Korean Albums (Circle)	23

=== Songs ===
Song chart performance
Title	Year	Peak chart positions
Title	Year	KOR Down.
"Miss You"	2023	138
"Only One"	2023	87

== Release history ==
Release history for Only One
Region	Date	Format	Label
South Korea	November 23, 2023	CD	GF; WMK
Various	November 23, 2023	Digital download; streaming	GF
