= The Mysterious Class =

2021 South Korean web series

- Promotional poster
- Hangul: 남고괴담
- Lit.: Ghost Story in a Boys' School
- RR: Namgogoedam
- MR: Namgogoedam
- Genre: Supernatural thriller; Mystery
- Developed by: Bamboo Network
- Written by: Han Song-yi
- Directed by: Ha Han-me
- Starring: Haruto Watanabe; Kim Do-young; Choi Hyun-suk; Bang Ye-dam; Asahi Hamada; So Jung-hwan; Yoon Jae-hyuk; Yoshinori Kanemoto; Park Jeong-woo; Kim Jun-kyu; Park Ji-hoon; Mashiho Takata
- Composer: Baek Jong-sung et al.
- Country of origin: South Korea
- Original language: Korean
- No. of seasons: 1
- No. of episodes: 8

Production
- Executive producer: Yang Ji-hoon
- Producers: Kim Hwi-hwan; Song Yoon-geun; Jung Da-bin
- Editor: Kim Jung-min
- Running time: 15–23 minutes
- Production company: YG Entertainment

Original release
- Network: YouTube
- Release: 12 November – 31 December 2021

The Mysterious Class (Korean: 남고괴담 (Note: The title is a compound of 남고 (namgo, a shortening of 남자 고등학교 namja godeunghakgyo "boys' high school") and 괴담 (goedam; "ghost story").); RR: Namgogoedam; pronounced [ˈna̠mɡo̞ɡwe̞(ː)da̠m; ˈna̠mɡo̞ɡø̞(ː)da̠m]) is a 2021 South Korean web series featuring an ensemble cast consisting of the members of boy band Treasure—Choi Hyun-suk, Park Ji-hoon, Yoshinori Kanemoto, Kim Jun-kyu, Yoon Jae-hyuk, Asahi Hamada, Kim Do-young, Haruto Watanabe, Park Jeong-woo, So Jung-hwan, Mashiho Takata, and Bang Ye-dam. Its plot centers on a group of 12th grade students in a boys' school who try to solve the mystery of their class' resident ghost.

The series aired for free viewing every Friday 22:00 KST on the band's official YouTube channel from 12 November to 31 December 2021. Short clips containing post-credits scenes for each episode were also uploaded for paid subscription in the band's Weverse account a day after its corresponding episode's airing date. It served as Treasure's first full-fledge endeavor in acting after the band made its acting debut through the short film It's Okay, That's Friendship (Note: 괜찮아, 우정이야) that was broadcast on 5 March 2021 as the 36th episode of their variety web series Treasure Map.

== Synopsis ==
In Boseok Boys High School, the students of Grade 12 – Class 4 are trying to come into terms with the possibility of a ghost lurking in their homeroom after discovering that their class of 21 students was supposed to have only 20. A series of spooky events drove the students to suspect each other while trying to solve the mystery of their class' resident ghost, who might simply be posing as one of their classmates.

== Cast ==
=== Main ===
The roles of the main characters of the series are played by members of the boy band Treasure, including their two former co-members: (Note: Upon concluding their contracts with YG Entertainment, Mashiho Takata and Bang Ye-dam formally departed from the band on November 8, 2022—almost a year after The Mysterious Class premiered.)

- Haruto Watanabe as Haruto

the resident ghost and former student of Grade 12 – Class 4 in Boseok Boys' High School; the late son of the school guard, Jae-hyuk's sole dorm roommate and Mr. Ha Dong-min's former classmate. Ten years prior to the events of the story, Haruto was a sickly student that rarely went to class due to his illness which ultimately led to his death, becoming the resident ghost of Grade 12 – Class 4. Ten years later, he became visible to the class' present batch of students and to its present homeroom teacher Mr. Ha, becoming the 21st "student" in a class that is supposed to have 20 students only. Yearning to have a normal school life "even after death", Haruto is fond of taking care of his classmates and enjoys taking photos of them using his Polaroid camera. Soon, his true identity is at risk of being exposed when his new classmates start looking for their class' resident ghost and begin suspecting each other.

- Kim Do-young as Kim Do-young

the class president of Grade 12 – Class 4 in Boseok Boys' High School; Hyun-suk and Jung-hwan's dorm roommate. Do-young has a strong sense of rivalry against his class' top student Jae-hyuk due to being pressured by his father to perform well in academics in order to be able to have his college studies abroad. He is determined to find out the identity of their class' resident ghost but only for the prospect of gaining their homeroom teacher's recommendation if he manages the class well as its class president.

- Choi Hyun-suk as Choi Hyun-suk

a student of Grade 12 – Class 4 in Boseok Boys' High School; Do-young and Jung-hwan's dorm roommate. Hyun-suk is interested in the paranormal and partnered with Ye-dam in doing a late-night séance that apparently revealed to the class the existence of a ghost in their homeroom.

- Bang Ye-dam as Bang Ye-dam

a student of Grade 12 – Class 4 in Boseok Boys' High School; Asahi, Yoshinori and Mashiho's dorm roommate; an aspiring K-pop artist. Ye-dam was Hyun-suk's partner in a séance; he later discovers that a music demo he is working on has apparently been tampered by their class' resident ghost.

- Asahi Hamada as Asahi

a student of Grade 12 – Class 4 in Boseok Boys' High School; Ye-dam, Yoshinori and Mashiho's dorm roommate. A quiet and introverted student, Asahi is a skilled painter who was suspected to be the class' resident ghost after his classmates discover a strange painting in the art room with his supposed signature.

- So Jung-hwan as So Jung-hwan

a student of Grade 12 – Class 4 in Boseok Boys' High School; Do-young and Hyun-suk's dorm roommate; a YouTube vlogger by the name of Super King Cow Baby. Jung-hwan enjoys filming vlogs, although his videos do not gain traction.

- Yoon Jae-hyuk as Yoon Jae-hyuk

a student of Grade 12 – Class 4 in Boseok Boys' High School; Haruto's sole roommate. As a top student, Jae-hyuk is very keen to studying and sometimes treats his less studious classmates coldly.

- Yoshinori Kanemoto as Yoshinori

a student of Grade 12 – Class 4 in Boseok Boys' High School; Ye-dam, Asahi and Mashiho's dorm roommate. Yoshinori is into tarot card reading and doing magic tricks. He is the grandson of a mudang (female shaman).

- Park Jeong-woo as Park Jeong-woo

a student of Grade 12 – Class 4 in Boseok Boys' High School; Jun-kyu and Ji-hoon's dorm roommate. Jeong-woo is an athletic boy who likes sports but is known to be a scaredy-cat among his classmates.

- Kim Jun-kyu as Kim Jun-kyu

a student of Grade 12 – Class 4 in Boseok Boys' High School; Jeong-woo and Ji-hoon's dorm roommate. Jun-kyu has a bright and outgoing personality, and is a doting lover to his girlfriend.

- Park Ji-hoon as Park Ji-hoon

a student of Grade 12 – Class 4 in Boseok Boys' High School; Jeong-woo and Jun-kyu's dorm roommate. Ji-hoon is a prankster who likes to scare his classmates.

- Mashiho Takata as Mashiho

a student of Grade 12 – Class 4 in Boseok Boys' High School; Ye-dam, Asahi and Yoshinori's dorm roommate. Mashiho is a punctual student who regularly drinks milk for his growth plates.

=== Supporting ===
- Jang Tae-hoon as Ha Dong-min

the homeroom teacher of Grade 12 – Class 4 and an alumnus of Boseok Boys' High School; Haruto's former classmate. Mr. Ha was caught in an accident while working overtime coincidentally on the night his students, led by Hyun-suk and Ye-dam, did a séance. He trusted Do-young with the responsibility of managing the homeroom, promising him support in his overseas college career if he manages the class well. He is revealed to be a classmate of the late Haruto ten years prior to the events of the story.

- Lee Kyung-min as Hong Sung-joon

a Grade 12 student in Boseok Boys' High School; Won-jin's classmate and an acquaintance of the students of Grade 12 – Class 4.

- Chae Hee-soo as Son Won-jin

a Grade 12 student in Boseok Boys' High School; Sung-joon's classmate and an acquaintance of the students of Grade 12 – Class 4.

- Seo Ye-ri as Lee Min-jung

a music teacher at Boseok Boys' High School.

- Kim Hong-boo as Jung Geun-yong

a teacher at Boseok Boys' High School; Mr. Ha Dong-min and Haruto's former homeroom teacher. Mr. Jung is the teacher in charge of the school's milk rations. He is Mr. Ha's predecessor as homeroom teacher of Grade 12 – Class 4.

- Han Myung-chul as Boseok Boys' High School's security guard

a staff at Boseok Boys' High School; Haruto's father. Deeply brokenhearted by his son's death at a such young age, he hid the funerary urn that contains Haruto's remains inside Haruto's own locker in the Grade 12 – Class 4 classroom where Haruto's ghost has been lingering since then.

=== Others ===
- Goo Shi-yeon as Jeong-woo's mother
- Goo Jae-yeon as Yoshinori's grandmother, a mudang (female shaman)

== Episodes ==
The following table contains the episodes of the series:

No.	Title	Directed by	Written by	Original release date
1	"There's a Ghost in Our Class"; Transliteration: "Uri bane gwisini isseo" (Korean: 우리 반에 귀신이 있어)	Ha Han-me	Han Song-yi	12 November 2021
The students of Boseok Boys' High School Grade 12 – Class 4 run away in panic when a mysterious force apparently responded to their late-night classroom seance and, in their rush to escape, discover their homeroom teacher lying unconscious in the stairwell. Class president Do-young soon realizes that the result of the séance might be true after learning that their class of 21 is supposed to have 20 students only.
2	"Who Could Be the Ghost?"; Transliteration: "Nuga gwisinilkkayo?" (Korean: 누가 귀신일까요?)	Ha Han-me	Han Song-yi	19 November 2021
Class 4 becomes unnerved when a spooky voice resounds from Ye-dam's music demo. Do-young declares his strong opinion that they have to expel the ghost from their homeroom while paranormal geek Hyun-suk, one of the main participants of the séance, starts carrying out his plans to expose the ghost's identity.
3	"The Ghost's Insidious Influence on Our Class"; Transliteration: "Gwisini uribane michineun yeonghyang" (Korean: 귀신이 우리반에 미치는 영향)	Ha Han-me	Han Song-yi	26 November 2021
Upon being suspected as the class' resident ghost, an annoyed Asahi proves his classmates wrong with an irrefutable evidence of his innocence. Jae-hyuk secretly obtains a bujeok talisman from Yoshinori's shaman grandmother to counter a baleful presence that has affected his academic performance. An argument quickly ensues between Jung-hwan and Do-young over the former's late night live streaming of ghost hunting inside their classroom. After being accused by Asahi of being the resident ghost, Haruto gets burned by the bujeok that Jae-hyuk, his dorm roommate, had acquired from Yoshinori.
4	"If You Pretend to be the Ghost ... The Ghost Itself Will Punish You."; Transliteration: "Gwisini cheok hamyeon ... gwisinhante honna." (Korean: 귀신이 척 하면... 귀신한테 혼나.)	Ha Han-me	Han Song-yi	3 December 2021
Jae-hyuk asks Yoshinori if they could put another bujeok inside their homeroom. Jung-hwan resorts to filming "paranormal activity" that he had secretly contrived to cause fear among his classmates, desperate to gain more online following. Do-young confronts him anew, but Jung-hwan suspects that Do-young must be hiding something from the class. After Jae-hyuk makes a chilling discovery at his dorm room, Jung-hwan's attempt at getting back at Do-young backfires when the real ghost Haruto haunts him to give him a stern warning.
5	"The Classroom That Is Truly Haunted"; Transliteration: "Jinjjaro gwisindeullin gyosil" (Korean: 진짜로 귀신들린 교실)	Ha Han-me	Han Song-yi	10 December 2021
An unwitting Haruto allows Yoshinori to predict his future using tarot cards. Class 4 sets up a haunted house booth for the school's spring festival, though their first clients remain unflustered by their meager attempts to scare them. To save their booth, Haruto uses his powers to haunt the school building, but he scares both their next clients and his classmates in the process. When Class 4 manages to escape, they realize that Haruto and scaredy-cat Jeong-woo are still in the building.
6	"Hide Well, The Ghost's Identity Will Be Discovered"; Transliteration: "Kkok-kkok sumeora gwisin jeongche deulkilla" (Korean: 꼭꼭 숨어라 귀신 정체 들킬라)	Ha Han-me	Han Song-yi	17 December 2021
Haruto is gripped with guilt and the fear of rejection as Jeong-woo becomes hospitalized after accidentally getting injured and losing consciousness in the midst of Haruto's school-wide haunting at the school festival. Tensions rise among Class 4 students who start pointing fingers at each other, thinking the ghost intended to harm Jeong-woo. Haruto tries apologizing in person to Jeong-woo, who became mute due to trauma, but to no avail. While Haruto is not yet ready to open up and explain his side, Do-young discovers Haruto's true identity and exposes him to the class.
7	"There's No Ghost In Our Class Anymore"; Transliteration: "Ije uribane gwisineun eopda" (Korean: 이제 우리반에 귀신은 없다)	Ha Han-me	Han Song-yi	24 December 2021
Haruto is forced to admit his identity and reveal his tale to Class 4, but many of them do not believe in his innocence. While Haruto's father, the school guard, grieves for his late son, Class 4 remains divided on whether nor not to evict Haruto from the homeroom. Fueled by his failure to get their homeroom teacher's recommendation, Do-young plans to expel Haruto through a homeroom exorcism and initiates a poll, but Class 4 settles to keep Haruto in a narrow vote. Class 4's homeroom teacher finally realizes Haruto's identity and confronts him in a fit of rage.
8	"Can We Be Friends With the Ghost?"; Transliteration: "Gwisin-gwa chin-guga doel su isseulkka?" (Korean: 귀신과 친구가 될 수 있을까?)	Ha Han-me	Han Song-yi	31 December 2021
Class 4's homeroom teacher orders Haruto's desk to be taken out of the classroom and imposes a penalty to those who attempt to talk to Haruto or even just mention his name. While his father resigns for his sake, Haruto ultimately loses his visibility and physical form but continues showing care to his classmates. The class' sympathy for Haruto is put to the test when their homeroom teacher hires Yoshinori's grandmother to hold a ritual to exorcise the homeroom.

== Soundtrack ==
The soundtrack for The Mysterious Class consists of musical score composed by Baek Jong-sung et al. and the following two theme songs. Both of these theme songs are performed by Treasure and were released on 15 February 2022 through the CD version of the band's first extended play The Second Step: Chapter One.

The Second Step: Chapter One (CD version)
No.	Title	Lyrics	Music	Arrangement	Length
5.	"BFF (Best Friends Forever)"	Choi Hyun-suk; MGNTK; Q	Q; Choi Hyun-suk; MGNTK	Q; MGNTK	3:22
6.	"Gonna Be Fine" (performed by Park Ji-hoon, Bang Ye-dam, Haruto Watanabe and Park Jeong-woo)	Edle	Q; Modo	Modo; Q; MGNTK	3:55

A Christmas version of "BFF (Best Friends Forever)" was released earlier on 24 December 2021 through the band's official social media accounts.
