= Bang Ye-dam =

South Korean singer (born 2002)

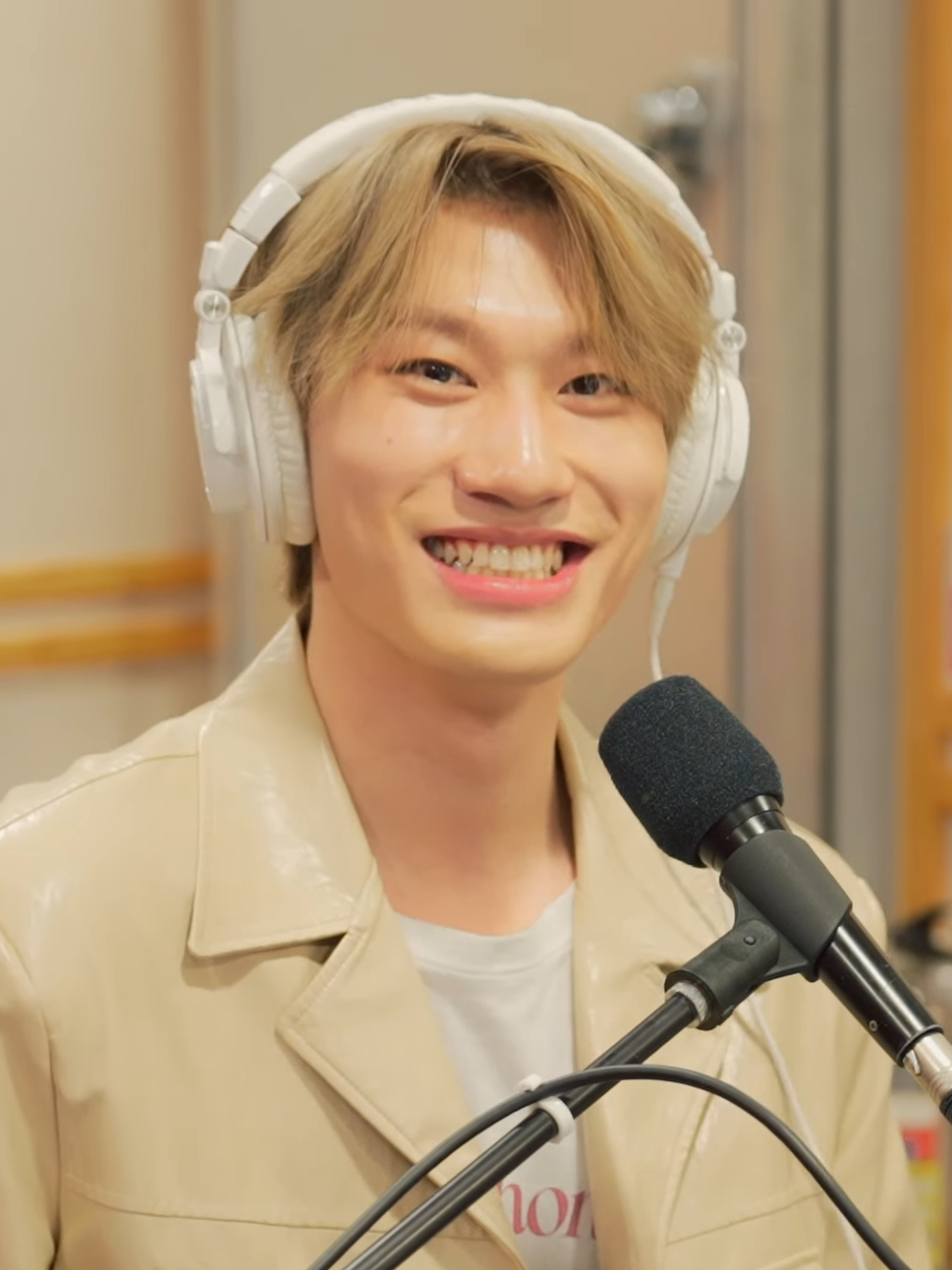
- Bang in December 2023
- Born: May 7, 2002 (age 24); Mapo District, Seoul, South Korea
- Education: School of Performing Arts Seoul
- Occupation: Singer
- Musical career
- Genres: K-pop; R&B
- Instrument: Vocals
- Years active: 2020–present
- Label: GF Entertainment
- Formerly of: Treasure; YG Family

Korean name
- Hangul: 방예담
- Hanja: 方藝潭
- RR: Bang Yedam
- MR: Pang Yedam

Signature
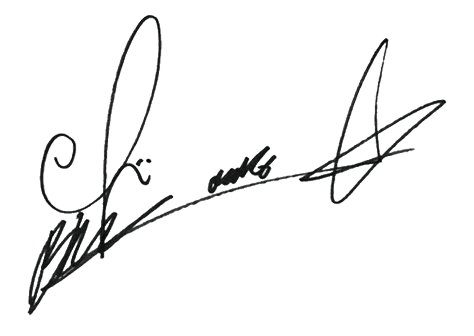

Bang Ye-dam (Korean: 방예담; born May 7, 2002) is a South Korean singer, songwriter and producer. He is best known as a former member of South Korean boy band Treasure and for competing in the second installment of K-pop Star (2012–2013), where he finished as runner-up. He debuted as a soloist with the digital single titled "Wayo" (왜요) on June 5, 2020. In August 2023, he signed with GF Entertainment as soloist and producer. Since 2025, he has also released music under the alter ego DIMO REX, exploring a more mature musical side.

== Life and career ==
=== 2002–2011: Early life ===
Bang Ye-dam was born on May 7, 2002, in Seoul, South Korea. Coming from a musically oriented family, his father, Bang Dae-sik is well known for creating over forty songs for commercials and animations including the Korean-dub for Japanese anime opening songs Pokémon, Dragon Ball and more. His mother, Jung Mi-young is well known for singing soundtracks in the Korean drama Friends and film After the Show Ends (연극이 끝난 뒤). His uncle Bang Yong-seok is well known as a composer and director in the commercial film industry. Within his family, he is an only child. Five-year-old Bang (Korean age) participated in the opening songs for EBS' television series Bboong bboong-E (방귀대장 뿡뿡이) and the Korean-dub version of the Japanese anime Onegai! Samia-don (모래요정 바람돌이). On March 5, 2007, he made his first television appearance on EBS' documentary 15 Second Fever, Hold the World with his parents. During his adolescence, he attended Sin-seok Elementary School and Kwang-sung Middle School.

=== 2012–2019: Career beginnings ===
In August 2012 Bang auditioned for SBS K-Pop Star Season 2. During the first round, BoA complimented his vocals by comparing to a young Michael Jackson. Park Jin-young praised his rhythm while Yang Hyun-suk was intrigued, commending his voice could reach the soul of the audience. He placed runner-up behind sibling duo Akdong Musician (AKMU). In June 2013, Yang Hyun-suk confirmed Bang had joined his label, thus, both first and second-place winners were now signed under YG Entertainment. That same year, he appeared on the finale of WIN: Who is Next with Lee Hi and Akdong Musician and sang Officially Missing You on October 27. Interactions with Kpop Star alumni, Lee Seung-hoon, resulted in appearances in unreleased clips from the show with Winner, formerly Team A. In January 2014, he also made a cameo appearance on Winner TV.

Bang appeared on television for the first time in four years with Stray Kids (2017) alongside other fellow trainees under YG Entertainment as its representatives. His name rose to the top of South Korean search portal site Naver while his performance video for "There's Nothing Holdin' Me Back" by Shawn Mendes peaked at number 1 on the Naver TV top 100 popular videos chart. On YouTube the video surpassed 3 million views in 24 hours and accumulated 59 million views as of January 2026. On October 5, 2018, he made a cameo appearance on Netflix television series YG Future Strategy Office (2018) as himself.

In November 2018 Bang participated in reality survival program YG Treasure Box (2018), where 29 trainees competed to secure a spot in the new boy group. He participated as a contestant under "Team A". During the finals, Bang joined the final line-up by overall placing first among the vocal team. Marking the show's end, it was revealed the boy group had been named Treasure.

=== 2020–2022: Debut and departure from Treasure ===
On May 21, 2020, YG Entertainment announced ahead of Treasure's official debut, Bang would release a digital single, later revealed to be entitled "Wayo", on June 5. Notably, label-mates Kang Seung-yoon of Winner and Lee Chan-hyuk of AKMU participated in production. The song was accompanied with a music video dedicated to fans who supported him since his appearance on K-pop Star Season 2. His single did not carry out any broadcasting promotions due to his upcoming preparations for debut with Treasure. Upon release, the digital single peaked at number 10 on the Billboard World Digital Songs chart and entered the top 100 at number 98 on the Billboard Korea K-Pop 100 chart. Bang trained at YG Entertainment for seven years before officially debuting as a member of Treasure on August 7. They released the first installment to their The First Step series with the single album The First Step: Chapter One which included the lead single entitled "Boy". Five months into their career, The First Step series sold over one million copies. In result, the group earned the title "Million Seller". Bang also co-wrote "Darari" on their first extended play, The Second Step: Chapter One, which went viral on TikTok, and became their most streamed song on Spotify as of May 2026.

On November 8, 2022, YG Entertainment announced that Bang's exclusive contract with their company had been terminated and that he and fellow member Mashiho left the group. YG stated that Bang left to pursue a career in producing.

=== 2023–2024: New label, Only One and Good Vibes ===
In August 2023, Bang signed an exclusive contract with GF Entertainment as soloist and producer.

On October 30 GF announced the release of Bang's first extended play Only One on November 23. A pre-release single "Miss You" was released on November 10, 2023. On December 28, 2023, Big Naughty released "INFJ" featuring B.I and Yedam.

On February 22, 2024, Yedam released "My All" for the soundtrack of Branding in Seongsu. On March 14, 2024, it was announced that Yedam will collaborate with Winter on the single "Officially Cool". The song was released on April 2.

On August 12, Bang announced his second extended play Good Vibes, which was released on August 29, 2024.

=== 2025-present: DIMO REX ===
Beginning in 2025, with the two-track single, Resistance, Bang released music under the moniker, DIMO REX. The persona is used to share a more mature, sensual, R&B sound. This was followed by the two-track, Desire, and three-track Acceptance. The seven track album, Intoxicated was released January 30, 2026.

The track, "On the Table" (feat. Sik-K), from the single, Acceptance, was nominated for R&B Track of the Year at the 2026 Korean Hip Hop Awards.

What began as an invite for Bang to feature on a song, DIMOLLY was released February 10, 2026, as the first collaboration EP from musicians, Molly Yam and Bang as DIMO REX.

On April 10, 2026, the eight track album, Antidote was released.

On September 4, 2026, Bang released the eight track album, Metamorphosis.

== Personal life ==
While attending Kwang-sung middle school, it was revealed that academically Bang placed first among the entire school. Bang attended School of Performing Arts Seoul (SOPA), majoring in Practical Music located in Guro District, Seoul. In November 2018, he revealed he ranked the highest within the entire school during mock exams for the subjects Social studies and Science, and was named a "model student" in both school and as a trainee. Bang graduated from SOPA on February 5, 2021.

== Artistry ==
=== Influences ===
Bang is often referred to as the "Korean Justin Bieber" due to similarities in his earlier singing style, as well as many covers of Bieber's songs that gained popularity on social media, particularly his cover of "Baby" during SBS K-Pop Star Season 2.

Through EBS' Story, Bang revealed his greatest influences towards music are Michael Jackson and his parents. He has also cited G-Dragon of Big Bang as a role model.

== Discography ==
=== Extended plays ===
List of extended plays, with selected chart positions and sales
Title	Details	Peak chart positions	Sales
Title	Details	KOR	Sales
Only One	Released: November 23, 2023; Label: GF; Formats: CD, digital download, streaming	7	KOR: 57,182
Good Vibes	Released: August 29, 2024; Label: GF; Formats: CD, digital download, streaming	26	KOR: 12,515

=== Singles ===
==== As lead artist ====
List of singles as lead artist, showing year released, with selected chart positions and album name
Title	Year	Peak chart positions			Album
Title	Year	KOR Down.	KOR Hot	US World	Album
"Wayo" (왜요)	2020	200	94	10	Non-album single
"Miss You"	2023	138	—	—	Only One
"Only One"	2023	87	—	—	Only One
"Officially Cool" (with Winter)	2024	38	—	—	Non-album single
"O-He"	2024	133	—	—	Good Vibes
"—" denotes releases that did not chart or were not released in that region.

==== As featured artist ====
List of singles as featured artist, showing year released, with selected chart positions and album name
Title	Year	Peak chart positions	Album
Title	Year	KOR Down.	Album
"INFJ" (Big Naughty featuring B.I and Bang Ye-dam)	2023	52	Dingo X Big Naughty

=== Soundtrack appearances ===
List of soundtrack appearances, showing year released, with selected chart positions and album name
Title	Year	Peak chart positions	Album
Title	Year	KOR Down.	Album
"My All" (나의 낮과 밤이 너라서)	2024	199	Branding in Seongsu OST
"By Your Side"(다가가도 될까)	2024	—	No Gain No Love OST
"Like Yesterday" (어제처럼)	2024	—	The Listen: We Sing Together Again
"I Still Love You" (추억은 만남보다 이별에 남아) (with Monday Kiz, DK, Yoo Hwe-seung and Woody)	2024	147	The Listen: We Sing Together Again
"Hollo" (홀로)	2025	—	Study Group OST
"Stay in me" (내 안에 머물러요) (with Wheein)	2026	—	See You at Work Tomorrow! OST
"—" denotes releases that did not chart or were not released in that region.

=== Other charted songs ===
List of other charted songs, showing year released, with selected chart positions and album name
Title	Year	Peak position	Sales	Album
Title	Year	KOR	Sales	Album
"Sir Duke"	2013	42	KOR: 94,393	SBS K-Pop Star Season 2 Top 8
"When a Man Loves a Woman"	2013	61	KOR: 41,479	SBS K-Pop Star Season 2 Top 5
"Karma Chameleon"	2013	70	KOR: 41,254	SBS K-Pop Star Season 2 Top 2
"Selfish" (Be'O featuring Bang Ye-dam)	2024	178		Affection

=== Guest appearances ===
List of other appearances, showing year released, other artist(s) credited and album name
Title	Year	Other artist(s)	Album
"You're the One"	2013	—N/a	SBS K-Pop Star Season 2 Top 4
"Where Is the Love?"	2013	—N/a	SBS K-Pop Star Season 2 Top 3 Pt.1 – Baby
"Officially Missing You"	2013	—N/a	SBS K-Pop Star Season 2 Top 2 Special
"Bad Idea"	2024	Way Ched, pH-1	Blend
"Day by Day"	2024	—N/a	The Listen: We Sing Together Again

=== Songwriting credits ===
All song credits are adapted from the Korea Music Copyright Association's database, unless otherwise noted.

Year	Artist(s)	Song	Album	Lyricist		Composer		Arranger	
Year	Artist(s)	Song	Album	Credited	With	Credited	With	Credited	With
2021	Treasure	"Everyday"	Non-album single	Yes	Jaguaa, Choice37, Lil G, Choi Hyun-suk, LP, Yoshi, Sonny, Hae, Se.A	Yes	Asahi	No	—N/a
2022	Treasure	"Darari" (다라리)	The Second Step: Chapter One	Yes	Jaguaa, Choice37, Lil G, Choi Hyun-suk, LP, Yoshi, Sonny, Hae, Se.A	Yes	Choice37, Hae, Jaguaa, Choi Hyun-suk, Yoshi, Sonny, LP, Lil G	No	—N/a
2022	Treasure	"Darari (Rock Remix)" (다라리)	The Second Step: Chapter One	Yes	Jaguaa, Choice37, Lil G, Choi Hyun-suk, LP, Yoshi, Sonny, Hae, Se.A	Yes	Choice37, Hae, Jaguaa, Choi Hyun-suk, Yoshi, Sonny, LP, Lil G	No	—N/a
2022	Kang Seung-yoon	"Born to Love You"	Non-album single	Yes	—N/a	Yes	Rovin, LeeSS	No	—N/a
2022	Winner	"I Love U"	Holiday	Yes	Kang Seung-yoon, Mino, Lee Chan-hyuk, Airplay, Kid Wine	Yes	Kang Seung-yoon, Dee.P, Lee Chan-hyuk, Aftrshok, Rajan Muse, Noerio, Brian U	No	—N/a
2023	Himself	"Come To Me"	Only One	Yes	—N/a	Yes	Jay Dope, Migo, OnAir, Krap	Yes	Jay Dope, Migo, OnAir, Krap
2023	Himself	"Miss You"	Only One	Yes	—N/a	Yes	Rohan	Yes	Rohan
2023	Himself	"Miss You (Original version)"	Only One	Yes	—N/a	Yes	Rohan	Yes	Rohan
2023	Himself	"Miss You (Piano version)"	Only One	Yes	Rohan, Park Seo-joon, Josh McClelland	Yes	Rohan, Park Seo-joon, Josh McClelland	No	—N/a
2023	Himself	"Hebeolle" (헤벌레)	Only One	Yes	E.nee, Q	Yes	E.nee, Q	Yes	E.nee, Q
2023	Himself	"Not At All" (하나두)	Only One	Yes	—N/a	Yes	Q	Yes	Q
2023	Himself	"Only One" (하나만해)	Only One	Yes	—N/a	Yes	Kim Min-gu, Choi Woo-jung, Lee Ye-joon	Yes	Kim Min-gu, Choi Woo-jung, Lee Ye-joon
2023	Big Naughty (featuring B.I and Bang Ye-dam)	"INFJ"	Dingo X Big Naughty	Yes	B.I, Big Naughty	Yes	B.I, Way Ched, Big Naughty	No	—N/a
2024	Be'O (featuring Bang Ye-dam)	"Selfish"	Affection	Yes	Be'O	No	—N/a	No	—N/a
2024	Way Ched (featuring pH-1 and Bang Ye-dam)	"Bad Idea" (나쁜생각)	Blend	Yes	pH-1	No	—N/a	No	—N/a
2024	Himself	"Lovey" (애써)	Good Vibes	Yes	—N/a	Yes	Sein	Yes	Sein
2024	Himself	"T.M.B" (자기소개)	Good Vibes	Yes	—N/a	Yes	Choi Woo-jung, Lee Ye-joon, Kwon Se-young	Yes	Choi Woo-jung, Lee Ye-joon, Nam Seung-woo
2024	Himself	"We Good"	Good Vibes	Yes	—N/a	Yes	Woogie, Song Chi-won, Park Kyung-hyun	Yes	Woogie
2024	Himself	"Fallin'"	Good Vibes	Yes	—N/a	Yes	Sein	Yes	Sein
2024	Himself	"Lovin Ya'"	Good Vibes	Yes	Sokodomo	Yes	Gray, Sokodomo	Yes	Gray
2025	As persona, DIMO REX	"Like That"	Resistance	Yes	DIMO REX	No	Sein	No	Song Chi Won
2025	As persona, DIMO REX	"Slow"	Desire	Yes	DIMO REX, UO, Kim Seong Yeon	Yes	DIMO REX	Yes	DIMO REX, UO
2025	As persona, DIMO REX	"On the Table" (feat. 식케이 (Sik-K)	Acceptance	Yes	DIMO REX, Sik-K	Yes	DIMO REX, Sein, Sik-K	No	Sein
2026	As persona, DIMO REX	"You make me crzy" 넌 날 미치게 만들겠지만	DIMOLLY	Yes	Molly Yam, DIMO REX	Yes	Molly Yam, DIMO REX	No	Averzi
2026	As persona, DIMO REX	Roh Yun Ha "Too laid back" (feat. DIMO REX)	Sonogram	Yes	노윤하, DIMO REX	Yes	Venko, Lubin, 노윤하, DIMO REX	No	Venko
2026	As persona, DIMO REX	"Say My Name"	Antidote	Yes	노윤하, DIMO REX	Yes	노윤하, DIMO REX, tenforus	No	tenforus
2026	As persona, DIMO REX	"At the Bottom" (feat. templecitygrounds)	Antidote	Yes	DIMO REX	Yes	DIMO REX, templecitygrounds	No	templecitygrounds
2026	As persona, DIMO REX	"Don't Forget My Name"	Metamorphosis	Yes	DIMO REX	Yes	DIMO REX, Theevoni, G06 Beatz, FVBII, daboe, hyukjvn	No	Theevoni, G06 Beatz, FVBII, daboe, hyukjv

== Videography ==
=== Music video ===
Year	Title	Director(s)	Length	Ref.
As lead artist
2020	"Wayo" (왜요)	Han Sa-min	3:32	
2023	"Miss You"	Lee Sagan (Zanybros)	3:13	
2023	"Only One"	Lee Sagan (Zanybros)	3:22	
2024	"Officially Cool" (with Winter)	SNP Film	3:00	
2024	"O-He"	Hwang Kihyun	3:08	
2024	"Like Yesterday" (어제처럼)	Unknown	3:44	
As DIMO REX
2025	"Like That"	Unknown	2:55	
2025	"Slow"	MapOfEver	3:09	
2025	"On the Table" (feat. 식케이 (Sik-K)	Jiahn Sohn (JSON)	3:20	
2026	"You make me crzy" 넌 날 미치게 만들겠지만	Jiahn Sohn (JSON)	3:20	
2026	Roh Yun Ha "Too laid back" (feat. DIMO REX)	finale	3:44	
2026	"Say My Name"	Ilaseunggi Shokun	2:33	
2026	"At the Bottom" (feat. templecitygrounds)	Unknown	3:36	
2026	"Don't Forget My Name"	Unknown	2:37	
As featured artist
2023	"INFJ" (Big Naughty featuring B.I and Bang Ye-dam)	Mingi Kang	3:32	

== Filmography ==
=== Television series ===
Year	Title	Role	Notes	Ref.
2018	YG Future Strategy Office	Himself	Cameo (Episode 3)	

=== Television shows ===
Year	Title	Role	Notes	Ref.
2012–2013	K-pop Star 2	Contestant	Runner-up	
2014	K-pop Star 3	Cameo	Episode 14	
2014	Winner TV	Rapper kid	Episode 8	
2017	Stray Kids	YG Trainee	Episodes 6 and 7	
2018–2019	YG Treasure Box	Contestant	Survival program; Formation of Treasure	
2020	King of Mask Singer	Contestant	Episodes 283 and 284	
2022	I Can See Your Voice	Judge		
2023	The Seasons	Guest	Episode 10	
2023	King of Mask Singer	Participant		
2024	Immortal Songs	Participant		
2025	Be The Next: 9 Dreamers	Mentor		
2025	The Gentlemen's League 4	Cast member		

=== Web series ===
Year	Title	Role	Notes	Ref.
2021	The Mysterious Class	Bang Ye-dam	Main cast	

== Tours and concerts ==
=== Fan meeting ===
- Bang Yedam The 1st Fan Meeting in Japan (2024)
- Be Your D (2024)

=== Fan concert ===
- Bang Yedam 1st Fan Concert in Bangkok (2024)

== Awards and nominations ==
Name of the award ceremony, year presented, award category, nominee(s) of the award, and the result of the nomination
Award ceremony	Year	Category	Nominee(s)/work(s)	Result	Ref.
Gaon Chart Music Awards	2021	New Artist of the Year (Digital)	"Wayo" (왜요)	Nominated	
The Fact Music Awards	2024	Best Music – Winter	"Only One"	Nominated	
Korea Best Brand Awards	2024	Asia Star Grand Prize	"Only One"	Won	
