= Treasure (band) =

South Korean boy band

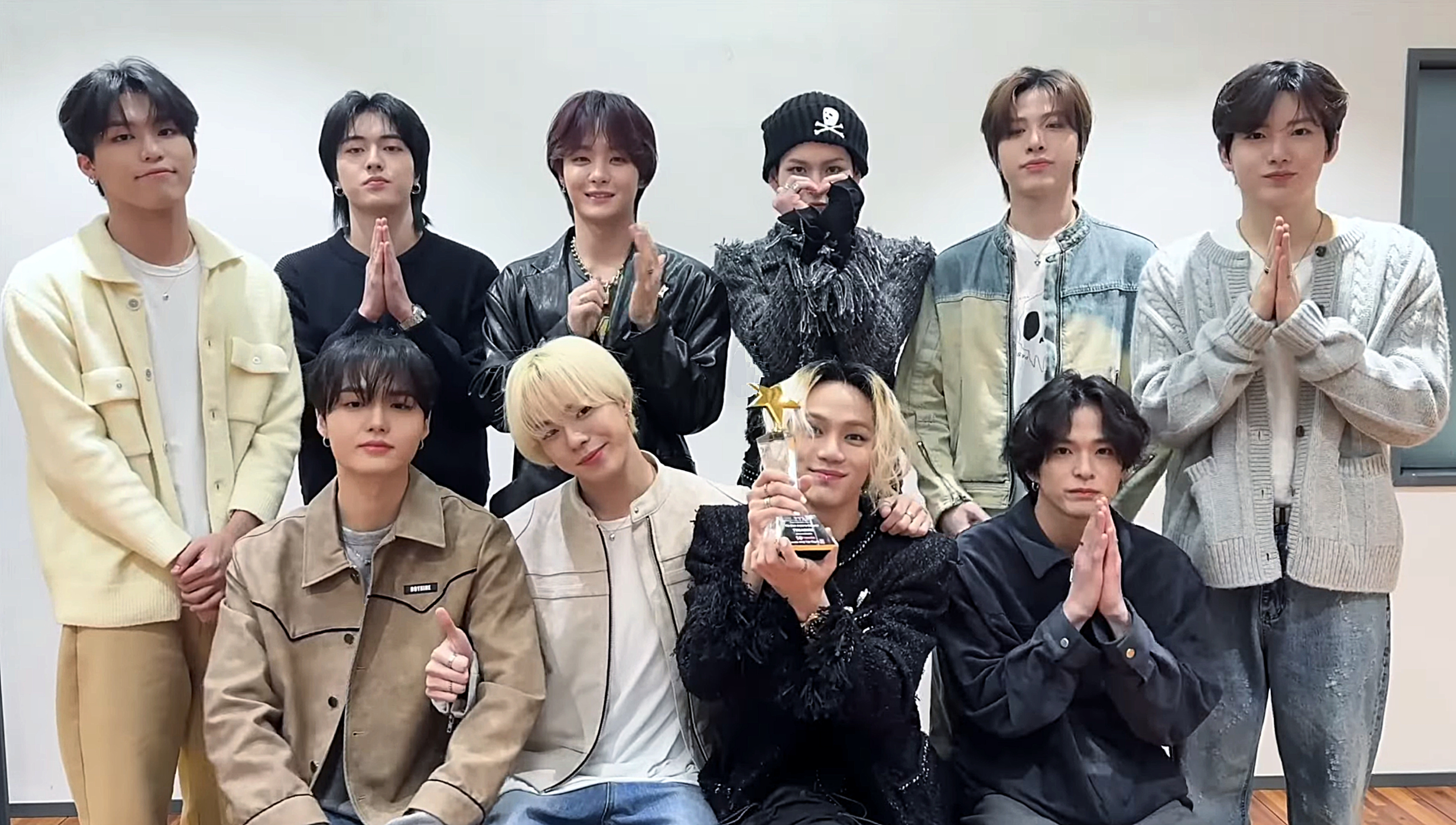
- Treasure in April 2024; L-R, from the top: Park Jeong-woo, Haruto, Jihoon, Yoshi, So Jung-hwan, Junkyu, Doyoung, Yoon Jae-hyuk, Choi Hyun-suk, Asahi

Background information
- Origin: Seoul, South Korea
- Genres: K-pop; dance; hip hop; ballad
- Years active: 2020–present
- Labels: YG; YGEX; Columbia
- Spinoffs: T5
- Members: Choi Hyun-suk; Jihoon; Yoshi; Junkyu; Yoon Jae-hyuk; Asahi; Doyoung; Haruto; Park Jeong-woo; So Jung-hwan
- Past members: Mashiho; Bang Ye-dam
- Website: yg-treasure.com

Treasure (Korean: 트레저; Japanese: トレジャー; stylized in all caps) is a South Korean boy band formed by YG Entertainment in 2019. The group consists of ten members: Choi Hyun-suk, Jihoon, Yoshi, Junkyu, Yoon Jae-hyuk, Asahi, Doyoung, Haruto, Park Jeong-woo, and So Jung-hwan. Treasure was originally composed of 12 members; Mashiho and Bang Ye-dam departed from the group in November 2022. The group debuted in 2020 with the single album The First Step: Chapter One, beginning a four-part The First Step series that also includes Chapter Two, Chapter Three, and the full-length compilation The First Step: Treasure Effect (2021). The series collectively sold over one million copies within just five months, marking one of the fastest-selling debut projects in K-pop.

== History ==
=== 2017–2019: Formation and pre-debut activities ===
Following the establishment of YG Entertainment's representative boy bands Big Bang (2006), Winner (2014), and iKon (2015), speculations regarding their next group circulated in 2017. Early reports identified K-pop Star 2 (2012–2013) runner-up, Bang Ye-dam, as a core trainee, with reports citing the prospective line-up as the label's youngest male act, comprising trainees aged 15–17 with an average of four to five years of training. Additional trainees associated with the nascent project appeared on Stray Kids (2017), including Bang and K-pop Star's (2011–2012) Choi Rae-sung.

The band's formation was determined through the reality program YG Treasure Box (2018–2019), featuring twenty-nine trainees. The final seven: Haruto, Bang Ye‑dam, So Jung‑hwan, Junkyu, Park Jeong‑woo, Yoon Jae‑hyuk, and Choi Hyun-suk, were introduced as Treasure. A second unit, Magnum, consisting of Ha Yoon‑bin, Mashiho, Doyoung, Yoshi, Jihoon, and Asahi, was later disclosed. Both teams were to promote collectively as Treasure 13. Following Ha's departure, they were reorganized, and the two units were consolidated under the single name Treasure.

Several members had prior stints in entertainment; Junkyu worked as a child model, Bang Ye-dam recording for animated programs, and So Jung-hwan briefly starred as a child actor and performed with the Taekwondo demonstration team K-Tigers. Mashiho featured in Akdong Musician's Spring of Winter (2016), while Choi Hyun-suk and Junkyu competed in Mix Nine (2017–2018). Bang was the earliest recruit among the final lineup, joining YG Entertainment in June 2013. Mashiho entered later that year through a Japanese audition. Junkyu, Choi, Doyoung, and Jihoon joined through academy‑facilitated private auditions between 2014 and 2016. So was cast shortly before the broadcast of YG Treasure Box. Yoon, the only member street‑cast, entered the agency a few months prior to the show's premiere, as did Asahi.

=== 2020–2022: Debut with The First Step tetralogy, reformation, and first Asia tour ===
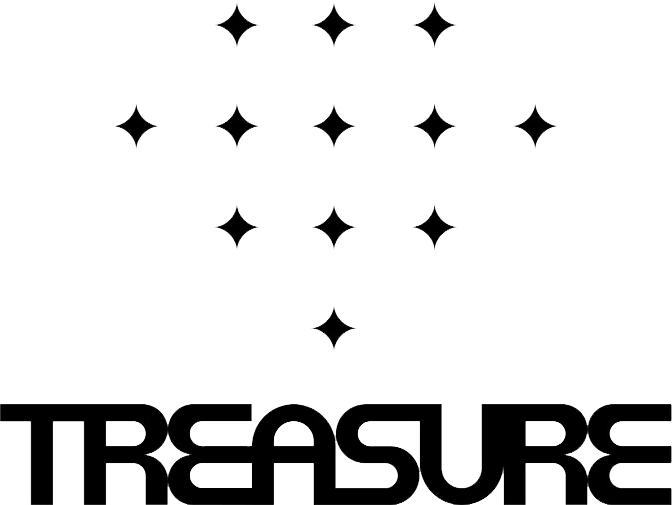
Image displaying Treasure's Logo

In January 2020, Treasure was re-introduced to the public with promotional pictorials and a performance video for "Going Crazy" (미쳐가네; michyeogane), first revealed on YG Treasure Box (2018–2019) and co-written by Mino of Winner. Their re-introduction also included variety programs such as Treasure Map. Modeled using Big Bang's debut as a blueprint, plans were set to release new music 3–4 times throughout the year, similar to how the quintet debuted with single albums in 2006. Prior to their official debut, Treasure became the fastest Korean act to chart on the Billboard Social 50, remaining on the chart for six consecutive weeks, and peaking at number 3 on August 29. Additionally, the group amassed an estimated 1.49 million subscribers on their YouTube channel ahead of their debut.

Treasure debuted on August 7, 2020, with the single album The First Step: Chapter One, the inaugural installment of The First Step series. The release garnered 170,000 pre-orders, debuted atop the Gaon Album Chart, and received platinum certification from the Korea Music Content Association (KMCA). The music video for its lead single "Boy" surpassed 10 million views within 26 hours and 20 million views within six days, later becoming their first to reach 100 million views on YouTube. The second installment, released on September 18, entered the Gaon Album Chart at number two. Its titular single "I Love You" (사랑해; saranghae), topped Rakuten Music's monthly chart for September despite less than two weeks of tracking. The third installment followed on November 6 with the lead single "Mmm" and the B-side "Orange" (오렌지; olenji), the group's first self-produced work, written by Asahi. The series concluded with their first studio album, released on January 11, 2021. It marked their third number one on the Circle Album Chart and debuted atop for the month of January. The series ended with over 710,000 copies sold in three months and one million in five months, earning the band multiple awards, including their first at the Asia Artist Awards.

Treasure lent their voices to the soundtrack of the TV Tokyo Japanese anime, Black Clover. First revealed on January 5, 2021, in the anime itself, the song also served as the band's first original Japanese release. It was digitally released as two versions on January 22 and February 14, respectively; where the full version of "Beautiful" entered the Billboard Japan Hot 100 chart at number 58, and the Billboard World Digital Song Sales chart at twenty-third. In commemoration of Black Clover's final episode, the full version was aired at the request of its director. Their Japanese debut album, sharing a title with their first full-length album, was released on March 31. It included the Japanese versions of all their Korean releases to date, with the group's newest single, "Beautiful", and the accompanied music video. The album debuted and consecutively charted at number one for four days on the Oricon Daily Chart, and debuted atop the weekly chart with over 57,000 sales in its first week. The band first appeared on terrestrial broadcast in Japan with the Nippon TV music program Buzz Rhythm, where they performed the Japanese version of "Boy", in conjunction to their official debut in the country.

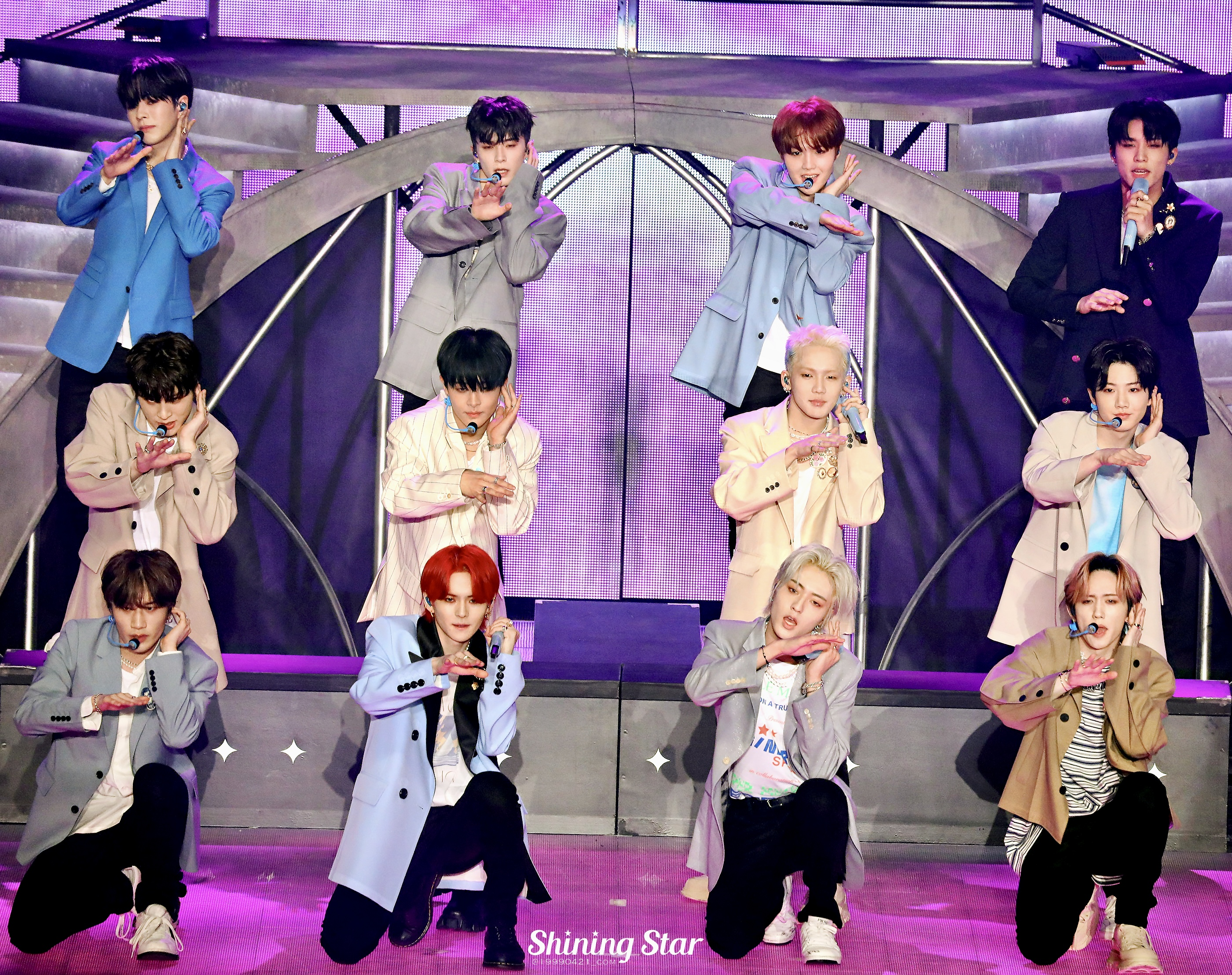
Treasure performing the b-side, "Darari" (다라리), at their first-ever concert entitled Trace, held at the Olympic Hall in Seoul on April 10, 2022

YG Entertainment publicized a prelude for "The Second Step" on New Year's Day, heralding The Second Step: Chapter One, their first extended play (EP), and its release on February 15, 2022. 600,000 records were pre-ordered in eight days whilst 700,000 were sold in three days. It was also listed in the twenty-five best K-pop albums of 2022 by Billboard staff. Its titular single, "Jikjin" (직진), obtained ₩500,000,000 ($420,000) for its music video, amassing 10 million views in 21 hours, and 20 million in under three days, also career highs rising five times faster. It reaped their first music show trophy on Show Champion and earliest entry on Circle Digital Chart. Its B-side, "Darari" (다라리), found success on TikTok, reaching 500 million views with over one million uploads, and was one of the most shazamed and streamed K-pop songs of 2022 on Apple Music and Spotify. Released on October 4, titular single, "Hello", from their sophomore EP was listed as one of five best K-pop songs of 2022 by Time while its Japanese equivalent became their first album to be certified gold by the Recording Industry Association of Japan (RIAJ). Bang Ye-dam and Mashiho, who went on hiatus in May to pursue studies in music and recuperate in health, respectively, were absent; both departed in November. They embarked on their first arena tour in Japan that month—the largest debut tour held in the country by a Korean act, exceeding 300,000 attendees—later extended to an Asia tour dubbed "Hello", in correlation to its latest release, concluding with est. 420,000 people.

=== 2023– 2024:Reboot project and career expansion ===
Treasure performing their Hello Tour in Manila, Philippines in April 2023.

SBS Power FM's Cultwo Show guests Treasure on August 8, 2023.

The ten-piece reunited with the Black Clover franchise for its theatrical soundtrack, with "Here I Stand". It became their first number one hit on the Billboard Japan Hot 100, and first platinum certification awarded by the RIAJ ensued from its integration into their Japanese single album of the same title. Its certification was attained five days following its release on March 29, 2023, and placed second on the Oricon Weekly chart with 235,347 copies sold, generating ¥464.4 million ($3.51 million) in five days. The band toured for two months across five cities of Japan for a nationwide fan meeting until its completion on November 12, 2023. It resulted them to visit an audience of half a million attendees across all stages since the outset of the year, and steered the band to become the first Korean act to enter Tokyo Dome for a fan meeting.

Treasure ushered a "reboot" project through a partnership with Columbia Records for global distribution and local marketing in North America, in tandem to their first official sub-unit, T5, with So Jung-hwan, Junkyu, Jihoon, Yoon Jae-hyuk, and Doyoung. Its creation was fostered amidst those who raised their hands and believed to be the most "handsome" within the band, molding the self-proclaimed "flower boy quintet". Its digital single, "Move", served as a pre-release for the decet's second studio album, and marked Junkyu's first solely penned piece. Released on July 28, 2023 Reboot achieved a three-fold increase in sales since its last release, selling 1,718,517 copies across various formats in two days. Its titular single, "Bona Bona", reached a career high, charting at number 27 on the Circle Digital chart, and peaked at number 14 on the Billboard Japan Hot 100, a personal best amongst their Korean releases. Its B-side, "B.O.M.B", received interest as it topped the Billboard Hot Trending Songs chart, and became the band's first work to enter an official chart in the United Kingdom. In conjunction to their latest release, the band commenced on their second Asia tour, named after their second full-length album.

Cited as a continuation of a new era that launched with Reboot (2023), Treasure released the digital single "King Kong", on May 28, 2024. In Japan, Treasure was selected to sing the opening song "Reverse" for the Japanese TV series Densetsu no Atama Sho (Legendary Head Sho), starring Fumiya Takahashi. It was further incorporated into the band's second Japanese single album, King Kong / Reverse, and its release on August 21.

Following New Year's Day, Junkyu and Asahi succeeded the leadership of the band from Choi Hyun-suk and Jihoon in 2025. For Treasure's third extended play (EP), a pre-release digital single titled "Last Night" was released on December 5, 2024. The EP Pleasure, was released on March 7, 2025, with the lead single "Yellow".

To thank Treasure Makers for their love and support, YG announced a fan concert tour, titled "Special Moment". During this tour, they also traveled to the United States, performing in 4 cities over 4 nights with an average of approximately 2,500 attendees per night. After their first US tour, they performed in 4 cities of Japan over 10 nights, connecting with a total of 150,000 fans just with the Japan tour alone. This pushed the group's total attendance in Japan past 970,000. The final show in Saitama was broadcast live across more than 100 theaters nationwide and aired on Fuji TV's satellite channel CS.

Since September 1, 2025, Treasure returned with their third mini-album Love Pulse, featuring the title track "Paradise", marking a more mature and dynamic musical and visual direction for the group. The EP's concept blends energetic pop and retro-disco-funk vibes, pairing bright, youthful energy with "heart-pulse" emotion, as the group presents "intense and diverse feelings" likened to the beat of love. The release sold over 1.13 million copies in its first week, becoming Treasure's first album to surpass one-million sales per Hanteo.

Concurrently, Treasure launched their Pulse On concert tour, which kicked off with a three-day show (October 10–12) at the KSPO Dome in Seoul, showcasing an expansive set-list combining new tracks from Love Pulse with older hits. The concert was described as powerful and immersive, with high production value, refined performances, and well-received stage presence.

== Public image ==
Dubbed the "fastest growing K-pop act in the world" of 2020 by Twitter, ranking above Tomorrow X Together and Stray Kids amidst other acts, the duodecet also placed sixth and ninth as the "Top 10 most mentioned K-pop artists in the world" and "Most tweeted K-pop accounts in the world", respectively, listed below musicians including BTS and Blackpink, and was the only group to be included in the Forbes Korea Power Celebrity 40 (Rising Star) beside Aespa and STAYC.

== Other ventures ==
=== Endorsements ===
In their career, Treasure became endorsement models for the naturalist cosmetics brand, Manyo Factory, assisting in achieving its highest sales through the group's product advocacy to the viewers on a live broadcast hosted with CJ Olive Young, and I'mmune, an aloe immune health functional food under Univera. Ongredients, an eco-friendly organic beauty brand, also recruited them as its newest muse for their Korean and Japanese affiliates, as well as lifestyle sports brand, FCMM.

Treasure also partook in various partnerships, including with the global creative studio, Line Friends,—in which their products, branded as Truz, sold out domestically in one minute through the official smart store, and under an hour in eighteen countries abroad—Shinsegae's convenience store, Emart24, and its branches in Korea and Malaysia, Pucca Puzzle Adventure game, Thai shoe brand Baoji, Unilever Japan, Crocs, and Uniqlo.

=== Ambassadorship ===
Year	Title	Appointed by	Ref.
2021	Brand Ambassador	Ruangguru, an Indonesian educational learning platform.	

=== Philanthropy ===
Members of Treasure joined senior label-mate, Sean of Jinusean's charity marathon event, Miracle 365, across various occasions ahead of their debut. Funds and awareness were raised to construct South Korea's first-ever Lou Gehrig rehabilitation hospital for those requiring medical treatment, resulted by the disability. Further acts include partaking in a program organized by YG Entertainment through the Blue Angel Volunteers at an animal shelter where they created shelters, cleaned, and restocked feed supply amidst other acts; and was involved in opening a school support fund through Naver's Happy Bean with Muju YG Foundation and Um Hong-gil Human Foundation, to construct schools for youths and adolescents, in Nepal's underprivileged areas. Treasure also donated ¥10 million ($66,485 approx.) to Red Cross for those affected by the 2024 Noto earthquake.

Treasure advocated for children diagnosed with cancer and partnered with YG Entertainment and Muju YG Foundation, to encourage individuals to provide help and create a difference by donating through the Naver platform. Happy Bean, and further used their social media platforms to advocate for the 51st Earth Day, voicing concerns on environmental problems which include climate change, and promoted how to confront these issues.

== Artistry ==
Produced under YG Entertainment, which has traditionally presented music largely rooted in hip-hop, the act offered a broader notion, with sounds more in line with other conventional K-pop groups with strong dance performance-based elements. The twelve-piece (currently ten) line-up signified a departure from the label's previous bands with four to five members, and is also more in line with those, including NCT 127 and Seventeen. Its leader, Choi Hyun-suk, cited the band offered a "plus alpha" element to the existing traditional "YG style", creating synergy with their cadence-heavy dance performances.

The band is known to be heavily involved in their craft and music.

=== Influences ===
In the band's debut press conference, they stated their main role model and influence towards their careers were their labelmate seniors under YG Entertainment through their various music releases and videos.

== Members ==
Adapted from their YGEX official website

=== Current ===
- Choi Hyun-suk (최현석) – rapper, dancer
- Jihoon (지훈) – vocalist, dancer
- Yoshi (요시; ヨシ) – rapper
- Junkyu (준규) – vocalist
- Yoon Jae-hyuk (윤재혁) – leader, vocalist
- Asahi (아사히; アサヒ) – vocalist
- Doyoung (도영) – vocalist, dancer
- Haruto (하루토; ハルト) – leader, rapper
- Park Jeong-woo (박정우) – vocalist
- So Jung-hwan (소정환) – vocalist, dancer

=== Former ===
- Mashiho (마시호; マシホ) – vocalist, dancer
- Bang Ye-dam (방예담) – vocalist

== Discography ==
- The First Step: Treasure Effect (2021)
- Reboot (2023)

== Filmography ==
=== Television shows ===
- YG Treasure Box (2018)
- Treasure Map (2020–2022)
- Shining Solo (2024)

=== Web shows ===
- T.M.I (Treasure Maker Interaction) (2020–present)
- Fact Check (팩트체크) (2020, 2023–present)
- 3-Minute Treasure (3분 트레저) (2020, 2023–present)
- T-Talk (2020, 2023–present)
- Treasure Studio (2020–2021) (Note: Collaboration with Line Friends)
- Find Your Korea (2021) (Note: Collaboration with Korea Tourism Organization)
- TMI Log (2021–2022)
- Treasure World Map (2023–present)
- Re:all Treasure (2023–2025)
- Yellow Days (2025)
- Lovely Days(2025- present)

=== Web series ===
- It's Okay, That's Friendship (2021) (Note: It's Okay, That's Friendship is a short film that was broadcast as the 36th episode of Treasure Map in a three-episode special that features Treasure trying out acting. The 35th episode presents the band's comedic "audition" prior to filming, while the 37th episode contains the behind-the-scenes of the filming process and the band members' reaction to the film.)
- The Mysterious Class (2021)
- My BF is Treasure (2023) (Note: As part of the band's web show Treasure Map, My BF is Treasure served as a parody one-episode web drama aired as its 64th episode; wherein each member represented a male character from well-known Korean shows.)

== Tours and concerts ==
=== Tours ===
Hello Tour (2022–2023)

Date	City	Country	Venue	Attendance	Ref.
November 12, 2022	Seoul	South Korea	KSPO Dome	—N/a	
November 13, 2022	Seoul	South Korea	KSPO Dome	—N/a	
November 26, 2022 (Note: Two Shows)	Sapporo	Japan	Hokkaido Prefectural Sports Center Hokkai Kitayell	est. 220,000	
November 27, 2022	Sapporo	Japan	Hokkaido Prefectural Sports Center Hokkai Kitayell	est. 220,000	
December 3, 2022	Echizen	Japan	Sun Dome Fukui	est. 220,000	
December 6, 2022	Nagoya	Japan	Nippon Gaishi Hall	est. 220,000	
December 7, 2022	Nagoya	Japan	Nippon Gaishi Hall	est. 220,000	
December 17, 2022	Fukuoka	Japan	Marine Messe Fukuoka	est. 220,000	
December 18, 2022	Fukuoka	Japan	Marine Messe Fukuoka	est. 220,000	
December 21, 2022	Kobe	Japan	Kobe Port Island Hall	est. 220,000	
December 22, 2022	Kobe	Japan	Kobe Port Island Hall	est. 220,000	
December 24, 2022	Kobe	Japan	Kobe Port Island Hall	est. 220,000	
December 25, 2022	Kobe	Japan	Kobe Port Island Hall	est. 220,000	
December 31, 2022	Tokyo	Japan	Tokyo Metropolitan Gymnasium	est. 220,000	
January 3, 2023	Saitama	Japan	Saitama Super Arena	est. 220,000	
January 4, 2023	Saitama	Japan	Saitama Super Arena	est. 220,000	
January 28, 2023	Osaka	Japan	Kyocera Dome Osaka	est. 80,000	
January 29, 2023	Osaka	Japan	Kyocera Dome Osaka	est. 80,000	
March 4, 2023	Taipei	Taiwan	NTSU Arena	est. 6,000	
March 11, 2023	Kuala Lumpur	Malaysia	Malawati Stadium	est. 6,000	
March 18, 2023	Jakarta	Indonesia	Indonesia Convention Exhibition	—N/a	
March 19, 2023	Jakarta	Indonesia	Indonesia Convention Exhibition	—N/a	
March 31, 2023	Bangkok	Thailand	Impact Arena	est. 30,000	
April 1, 2023	Bangkok	Thailand	Impact Arena	est. 30,000	
April 2, 2023	Bangkok	Thailand	Impact Arena	est. 30,000	
April 8, 2023	Singapore		Singapore Indoor Stadium	6,000	
April 14, 2023	Manila	Philippines	SM Mall of Asia Arena	—N/a	
April 15, 2023	Manila	Philippines	SM Mall of Asia Arena	—N/a	
April 22, 2023	Macau		Galaxy Arena at Galaxy Macau	—N/a	
May 20, 2023	Hong Kong	China	AsiaWorld–Arena	—N/a	
Total				est. 420,000	

Reboot Tour (2023–2024)

Date	City	Country	Venue	Guests	Attendance	Ref.
December 15, 2023	Seoul	South Korea	KSPO Dome	—N/a	data-sort-value="" style="background: var(--background-color-interactive, #ececec); color: var(--color-base, inherit); vertical-align: middle; text-align: center; " class="table-na" | —N/a	
December 16, 2023	Seoul	South Korea	KSPO Dome	—N/a	data-sort-value="" style="background: var(--background-color-interactive, #ececec); color: var(--color-base, inherit); vertical-align: middle; text-align: center; " class="table-na" | —N/a	
December 17, 2023	Seoul	South Korea	KSPO Dome	—N/a	data-sort-value="" style="background: var(--background-color-interactive, #ececec); color: var(--color-base, inherit); vertical-align: middle; text-align: center; " class="table-na" | —N/a	
January 6, 2024	Fukuoka	Japan	Fukuoka PayPay Dome	—N/a	300,000	
January 12, 2024	Saitama	Japan	Saitama Super Arena	—N/a	300,000	
January 13, 2024	Saitama	Japan	Saitama Super Arena	—N/a	300,000	
January 14, 2024	Saitama	Japan	Saitama Super Arena	—N/a	300,000	
January 20, 2024	Aichi	Japan	Aichi Sky Expo	—N/a	300,000	
January 21, 2024	Aichi	Japan	Aichi Sky Expo	—N/a	300,000	
February 3, 2024	Osaka	Japan	Kyocera Dome Osaka	—N/a	300,000	
February 4, 2024	Osaka	Japan	Kyocera Dome Osaka	—N/a	300,000	
February 10, 2024	Fukui	Japan	Sun Dome Fukui	—N/a	300,000	
February 11, 2024	Fukui	Japan	Sun Dome Fukui	—N/a	300,000	
February 14, 2024	Aichi	Japan	Nippon Gaishi Hall	—N/a	300,000	
February 15, 2024	Aichi	Japan	Nippon Gaishi Hall	—N/a	300,000	
February 22, 2024	Hiroshima	Japan	Hiroshima Green Arena	—N/a	300,000	
February 23, 2024	Hiroshima	Japan	Hiroshima Green Arena	—N/a	300,000	
March 2, 2024	Yokohama	Japan	K-Arena Yokohama	—N/a	300,000	
March 3, 2024	Yokohama	Japan	K-Arena Yokohama	—N/a	300,000	
May 4, 2024	Manila	Philippines	SM Mall of Asia Arena	—N/a	—N/a	
May 18, 2024	Hong Kong	China	AsiaWorld–Arena	—N/a	—N/a	
May 23, 2024	Bangkok	Thailand	Impact Arena	—N/a	37,000	
May 24, 2024	Bangkok	Thailand	Impact Arena	—N/a	37,000	
May 25, 2024	Bangkok	Thailand	Impact Arena	—N/a	37,000	
May 26, 2024	Bangkok	Thailand	Impact Arena	—N/a	37,000	
June 22, 2024	Kuala Lumpur	Malaysia	Axiata Arena	—N/a	—N/a	
June 29, 2024	Jakarta	Indonesia	Indonesia Arena	—N/a	—N/a	
June 30, 2024	Jakarta	Indonesia	Indonesia Arena	—N/a	—N/a	
August 15, 2024	Seoul	South Korea	KSPO Dome	CL	—	
Total					N/A	

== Fan meetings ==
Date	Title	City	Country	Venue	Ref
October 02, 2021	TREASURE 1st Private Stage [TEU-DAY]	Seoul	South Korea	Olympic Hall	

Hello Again (2023)

Date	City	Country	Venue	Attendance	Ref.
September 2, 2023	Fukuoka	Japan	Fukuoka Convention Center	150,000	
September 3, 2023	Fukuoka	Japan	Fukuoka Convention Center	150,000	
September 8, 2023	Hyogo	Japan	Kobe Port Island Hall	150,000	
September 9, 2023	Hyogo	Japan	Kobe Port Island Hall	150,000	
September 10, 2023	Hyogo	Japan	Kobe Port Island Hall	150,000	
September 16, 2023	Kanagawa	Japan	Pia Arena MM	150,000	
September 17, 2023	Kanagawa	Japan	Pia Arena MM	150,000	
September 18, 2023	Kanagawa	Japan	Pia Arena MM	150,000	
September 23, 2023	Aichi	Japan	Aichi Sky Expo Hall A	150,000	
September 24, 2023	Aichi	Japan	Aichi Sky Expo Hall A	150,000	
September 30, 2023	Tokyo	Japan	Ariake Arena	150,000	
October 1, 2023	Tokyo	Japan	Ariake Arena	150,000	
November 12, 2023	Tokyo	Japan	Tokyo Dome	—N/a	
Total				—N/a	

Wonderland (2024)

Date	City	Country	Venue	Attendance	Ref.
July 6, 2024	Kanagawa	Japan	Pia Arena MM	40,000	
July 7, 2024	Kanagawa	Japan	Pia Arena MM	40,000	
July 13, 2024	Hiroshima	Japan	Hiroshima Green Arena	—N/a	
July 14, 2024	Hiroshima	Japan	Hiroshima Green Arena	—N/a	
July 18, 2024	Hyogo	Japan	Kobe World Memorial Hall	—N/a	
July 19, 2024	Hyogo	Japan	Kobe World Memorial Hall	—N/a	
July 20, 2024	Hyogo	Japan	Kobe World Memorial Hall	—N/a	
July 24, 2024	Nagoya	Japan	Nagoya International Exhibition Hall	—N/a	
July 25, 2024	Nagoya	Japan	Nagoya International Exhibition Hall	—N/a	
August 3, 2024	Tokyo	Japan	Ariake Arena	—N/a	
August 4, 2024	Tokyo	Japan	Ariake Arena	—N/a	
August 10, 2024	Fukuoka	Japan	Fukuoka Convention Center	—N/a	
August 11, 2024	Fukuoka	Japan	Fukuoka Convention Center	—N/a	
Total				170,000	

Special Moment (2025) (Note: Promoted as a "Fan concert")

Date	City	Country	Venue	Attendance	Ref.
March 28, 2025	Seoul	South Korea	Kyunghee University, Peace Hall	—N/a	
March 29, 2025	Seoul	South Korea	Kyunghee University, Peace Hall	—N/a	
March 30, 2025	Seoul	South Korea	Kyunghee University, Peace Hall	—N/a	
April 6, 2025	New York	United States	Brooklyn Paramount	—N/a	
April 8, 2025	Washington, DC	United States	The Theatre at MGM National Harbor	—N/a	
April 10, 2025	Oakland	United States	Paramount Theatre	—N/a	
April 13, 2025	Los Angeles	United States	YouTube Theater	—N/a	
April 23, 2025	Hyogo	Japan	Glion Arena Kobe	—N/a	
April 24, 2025	Hyogo	Japan	Glion Arena Kobe	—N/a	
May 2, 2025	Aichi	Japan	Aichi Sky Expo	—N/a	
May 3, 2025	Aichi	Japan	Aichi Sky Expo	—N/a	
May 5, 2025	Fukuoka	Japan	West Japan General Exhibition Center	—N/a	
May 6, 2025	Fukuoka	Japan	West Japan General Exhibition Center	—N/a	
May 17, 2025	Saitama	Japan	Saitama Super Arena	—N/a	
May 18, 2025	Saitama	Japan	Saitama Super Arena	—N/a	
Total				—N/a	

=== Concert ===
Date	Title	City	Country	Venue	Ref.
April 9–10, 2022	Trace	Seoul	South Korea	Olympic Hall	
