= Jihoon =

South Korean singer (born 2000)

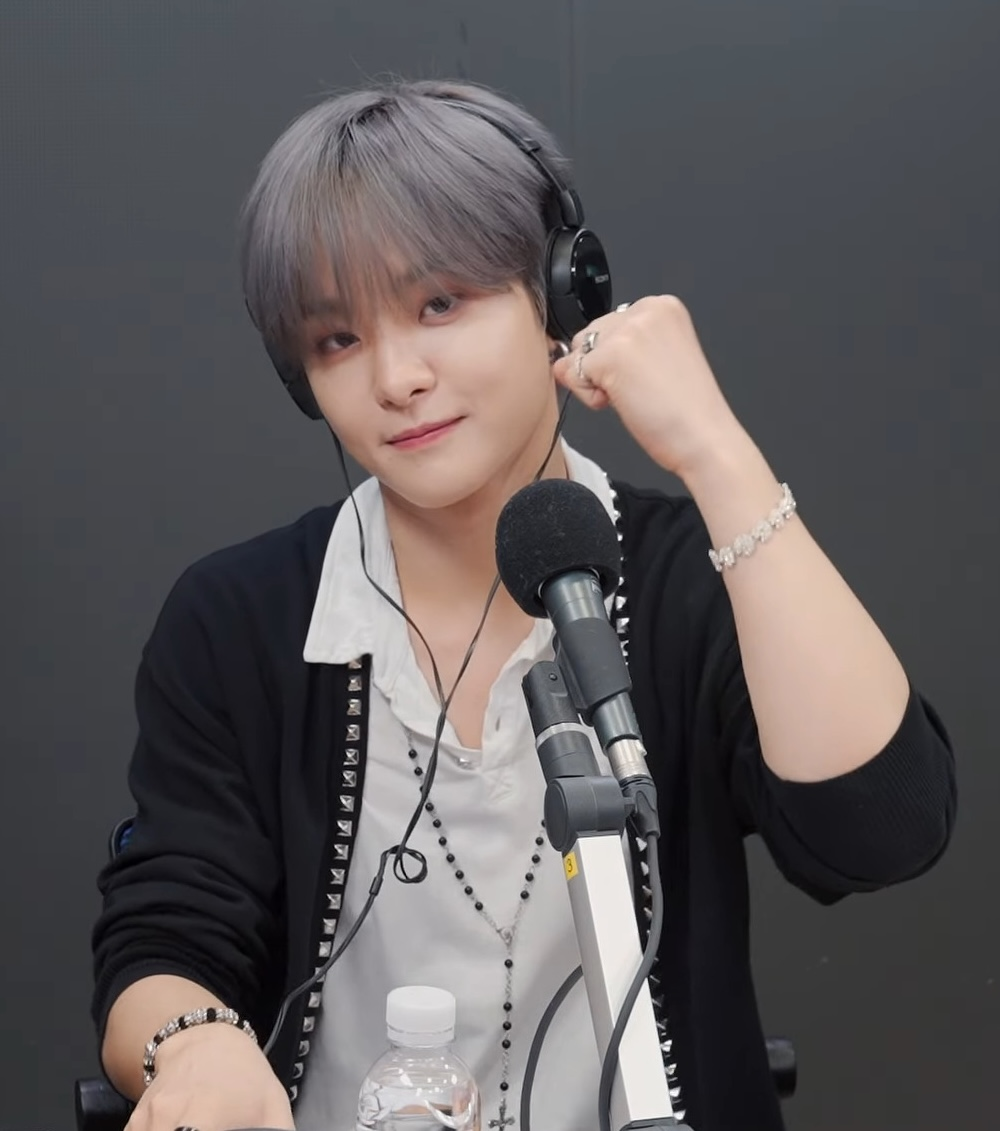
- Jihoon in August 2023
- Born: Park Ji-hoon; March 14, 2000 (age 26); Nam District, Busan, South Korea
- Occupations: Singer; dancer
- Years active: 2020–present
- Musical career
- Genres: K-pop
- Instrument: Vocals
- Label: YG
- Member of: Treasure; T5

Korean name
- Hangul: 박지훈
- Hanja: 朴志焄
- RR: Bak Jihun
- MR: Pak Chihun

Park Ji-hoon (Korean: 박지훈; born March 14, 2000), known mononymously as Jihoon, is a South Korean singer. He debuted in Treasure on August 7, 2020, and its single album entitled The First Step: Chapter One.

== Life and career ==
=== 2000–2016: Early life ===
Park Ji-hoon was born on March 14, 2000, in Nam District, Busan, South Korea as the youngest of two sons. Albeit he enjoyed singing from a young age, he did not intend to pursue it until he encountered WIN: Who Is Next (2013) in seventh grade of middle school at age 14 (Korean age). It showcased two teams—currently active as Winner and iKon—who competed for their debut under YG Entertainment. Initiating his dream to join and debut under the label, Jihoon was accepted into its trainee program in 2016, following his audition.

=== 2017–present: Debut with Treasure and solo endeavors ===
Jihoon first appeared on television in Stray Kids (2017) as a representative of his agency with Bang Ye-dam and Doyoung amidst others. In March 2018, his trainee status was revoked due to lack of progress, leading to his departure and training elsewhere. He was later invited by YG Entertainment to partake as a contestant on YG Treasure Box (2018–2019) as part of Team B. Failing to claim a position in the final septet, he was the fifth to be placed in a second line-up called "Magnum". The septet and sextet were subsequently merged and became the eventual 12-piece band, Treasure. He served as an "unofficial leader" with Choi Hyun-suk in their respective teams amidst training due to its size. With four years of training, his debut in Treasure followed on August 7, 2020, with the single album entitled The First Step: Chapter One. The band adopted the two-tier leadership with Jihoon and Choi after witnessing positive results from the once temporary system.

In the midst of his activities with the band, Jihoon served as a host for Inkigayo with Ahn Yu-jin of Ive and Sungchan of NCT for a tenure lasting between 2021 and 2022. He was cast by the South Korean director Na Young-seok and Ha Moo-sung to appear on their series The Idol Ramyeonators (2022) with Choi Hyun-suk following their guesting on their label's special of The Game Caterers.

== Public image ==
Jihoon debuted on the Gaon Social Chart 2.0, which integrates data from SMR, YouTube, Mubeat, V Live and My Celebs to calibrate a ranking among fifty artists, for the month of October in 2020. He also appeared on the Korean Business Research Institute's male celebrity brand reputation list, a chart that records Korean celebrities with the most online searches and engagements, and reached the top 50 for the month of March in 2021.

== Artistry ==
=== Influences ===
Jihoon has cited senior label-mate Big Bang as his musical influence, with member Taeyang captivating most of his focus.

== Filmography ==
=== Web series ===
Year	Title		Role	Notes	Ref.
Year	English	Korean	Role	Notes	Ref.
2021	The Mysterious Class	남고괴담	Park Ji-hoon	Main cast	

=== Television shows ===
Year	Title		Role	Notes	Ref.
Year	English	Korean	Role	Notes	Ref.
2018–2019	YG Treasure Box	YG 보석함	Contestant	Formation of Treasure	
2022	The Idol Ramyeonators	라끼돌	Cast member	with Choi Hyun-suk	
2024	King of Mask Singer	복면가왕	Contestant	Episode 456	

=== Hosting ===
Year	Title		Notes	Ref.
Year	English	Korean	Notes	Ref.
2021–2022	Inkigayo	인기가요	with Sungchan and Yujin	
