= List of awards and nominations received by BigBang =

Big Bang awards and nominations
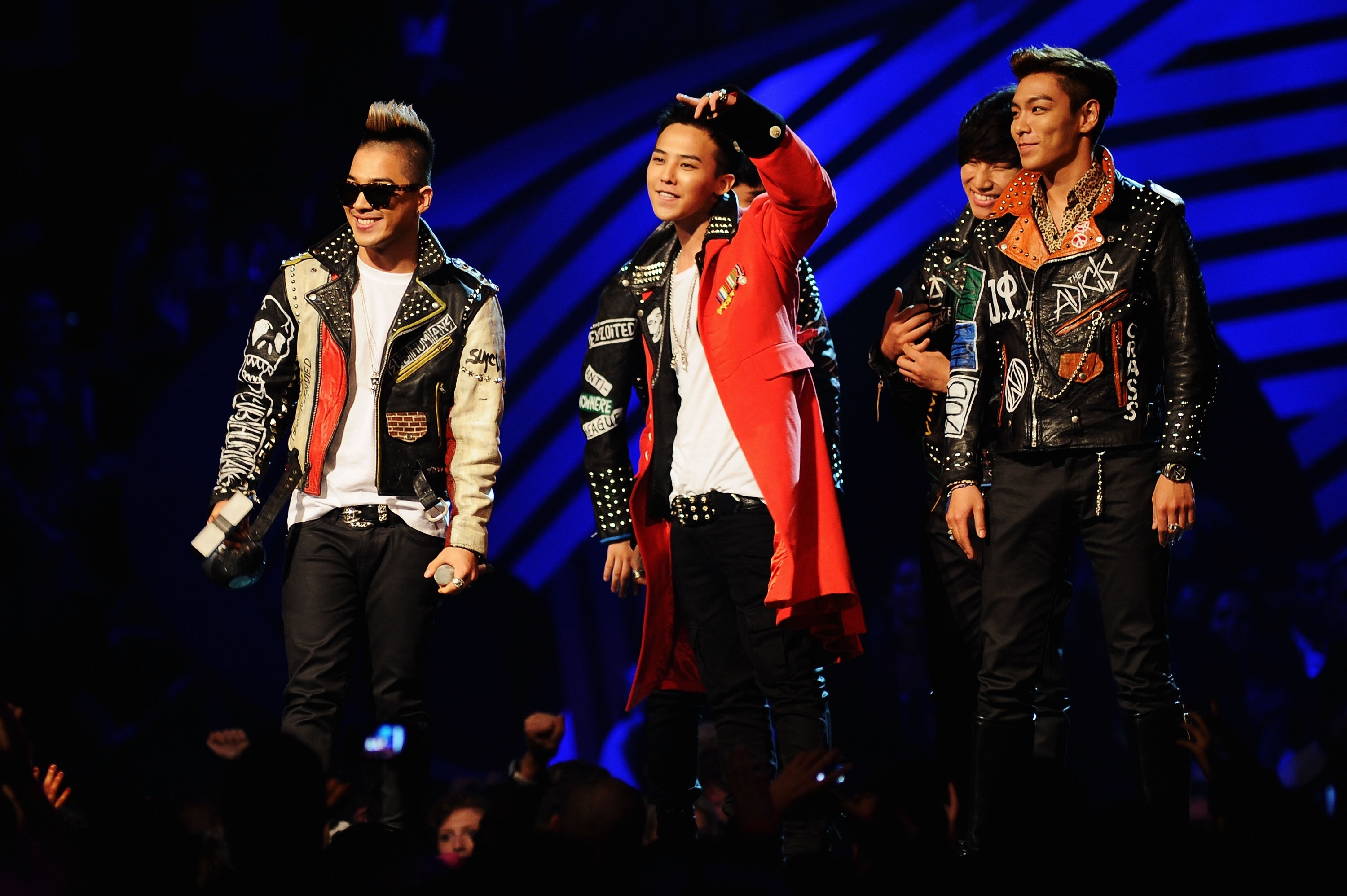
- Big Bang at the 2011 MTV Europe Music Awards
Awards and nominations
Award	Wins	Nominations
Asia Artist Awards	0	2
Asian Pop Music Awards	1	3
Cyworld Digital Music Awards	10	10
Gaon Chart Music Awards	11	16
Genie Music Awards	0	4
Golden Disc Awards	10	20
Japan Gold Disc Award	11	11
Japan Record Awards	4	4
Korean Music Awards	4	6
MAMA Awards	16	35
Melon Music Awards	15	24
Mnet 20's Choice Awards	2	4
MTV Asia Awards	0	1
MTV Europe Music Awards	3	4
MTV Italian Music Awards	2	2
MTV Video Music Awards Japan	3	3
Myx Music Awards	0	2
Nickelodeon Kids' Choice Awards	0	1
IFPI-Hong Kong Top Sales Music Award	2	2
InStyle Star Icon Awards	1	1
QQ Music Awards	3	3
Seoul Music Awards	10	16
iHeartRadio Music Awards	0	1
Singapore E-Awards	1	4
So-Loved Awards	3	3
Soompi Awards	3	9
YouTube Music Awards	1	1
World Music Awards	3	3
Other awards	29	33

Totals (Note: Certain award groups do not simply award one winner. They acknowledge several different recipients, have runners-up, and have third place. Since this is a specific recognition and is different from losing an award, runner-up mentions are considered wins in this award tally. For simplification and to avoid errors, each award in this list has been presumed to have had a prior nomination.)
- Wins: 148
- Nominations: 235

South Korean boy band Big Bang, formed in 2006 under YG Entertainment, composes of four-members: G-Dragon, Taeyang, T.O.P, and Daesung. The group debuted with the single album Big Bang on August 28, 2006, which were followed by two more single albums leading up to their debut Korean studio album, Bigbang Vol.1 (2006). The group's early works were met with moderate success; it was not until their 2007 breakthrough single "Lies" where the group began to gain widespread recognition. At the 2007 Mnet Km Music Festival, BigBang was nominated for five categories, taking home Song of the Year for "Lies" and Best Male Artist. In January 2008, BigBang won all three categories where they were nominated in at the 17th Seoul Music Awards, including the Grand Prize and Best Song for "Lies". A year later, they were awarded Artist of the Year and Best Male Group and at the 2008 Mnet Km Music Festival and Best Album at the 18th Seoul Music Awards. BigBang began expanding their popularity overseas with the release of their Japanese studio albums Number 1 (2008) and Big Bang (2009), winning Best New Artist at the 51st Japan Record Awards.

BigBang returned to South Korea with their fourth EP Tonight (2011), and were presented the award for Best Worldwide Act at the 2011 MTV Europe Music Awards in Belfast. In February 2012, the group released their fifth EP Alive, which spawned the singles "Fantastic Baby", "Blue" and "Bad Boy". That November, BigBang were nominated in six categories at the 2012 Mnet Asian Music Awards, winning three awards including Artist of the Year and Best Male Group. They were also awarded the Guardian Angel award at the same ceremony following the success of their first worldwide concert tour, the Alive Galaxy Tour. At the 2nd Gaon Chart Music Awards, Alive and its singles "Blue" and "Fantastic Baby" won Album of the Year (1st Quarter) and Song of the Year for February and March, respectively.

The group reunited in 2015 with their "Made" series, releasing four single albums—M, A, D, and E—from May to August 2015. The series experienced commercial success, leading the group to become the most nominated and awarded act at the 2015 Mnet Asian Music Awards, winning four out of eight nominations including Artist and Song of the Year. At the annual Melon Music Awards, they were nominated in five categories and similarly won Artist of the Year and Song of the Year for "Bang Bang Bang". The group were additionally awarded with the Song of the Year prize at the 13th Korean Music Awards and 31st Golden Disc Awards in early 2016. At the 5th Gaon Chart Music Awards in February of that year, BigBang won Song of the Month for four consecutive months from May to August with their singles from Made: "Loser", "Bang Bang Bang", "If You", and "Let's Not Fall in Love".

== Awards and nominations ==
Name of the award ceremony, year presented, category, nominee of the award, and the result of the nomination
Organization	Year	Category	Nominee / work	Result	Ref.
Asia Artist Awards	2016	Most Popular Artists (Singer)	BigBang	Nominated	
Asia Artist Awards	2017	Most Popular Artists (Singer)	BigBang	Nominated	
Asian Pop Music Awards	2022	Record of the Year (Overseas)	"Still Life"	Nominated	
Asian Pop Music Awards	2022	Best Music Video (Overseas)	"Still Life"	Nominated	
Asian Pop Music Awards	2022	Top 20 Songs (Overseas)	"Still Life"	Won	
Best Hits Song Festival	2009	Gold Artist Award	BigBang	Won	
Bugs Music Awards	2011	Best Male Group	BigBang	Nominated	
Bugs Music Awards	2011	Popularity Award	BigBang	Nominated	
Bugs Music Awards	2020	20th Anniversary – Most Loved Artists	BigBang	Won	
Cyworld Digital Music Awards	2006	Rookie of the Month (October)	"La La La"	Won	
Cyworld Digital Music Awards	2007	Song of the Month (August)	"Lies"	Won	
Cyworld Digital Music Awards	2007	Song of the Month (September)	"Lies"	Won	
Cyworld Digital Music Awards	2007	Song of the Month (December)	"Last Farewell"	Won	
Cyworld Digital Music Awards	2008	Song of the Month (August)	"Haru Haru"	Won	
Cyworld Digital Music Awards	2008	Song of the Month (November)	"Sunset Glow"	Won	
Cyworld Digital Music Awards	2009	Song of the Month (April)	"Lollipop" (with 2NE1)	Won	
Cyworld Digital Music Awards	2009	Bonsang	"Hallelujah"	Won	
Cyworld Digital Music Awards	2012	Song of the Month (February)	"Blue"	Won	
Cyworld Digital Music Awards	2012	Song of the Month (March)	"Fantastic Baby"	Won	
Gaon Chart Music Awards	2012	Song of the Year (April)	"Love Song"	Won	
Gaon Chart Music Awards	2013	Song of the Year (February)	"Blue"	Won	
Gaon Chart Music Awards	2013	Song of the Year (March)	"Fantastic Baby"	Won	
Gaon Chart Music Awards	2013	Album of the Year (1st Quarter)	Alive	Won	
Gaon Chart Music Awards	2016	Song of the Year (May)	"Loser"	Won	
Gaon Chart Music Awards	2016	Song of the Year (June)	"Bang Bang Bang"	Won	
Gaon Chart Music Awards	2016	Song of the Year (July)	"If You"	Won	
Gaon Chart Music Awards	2016	Song of the Year (August)	"Let's Not Fall In Love"	Won	
Gaon Chart Music Awards	2016	Most Influential Group in Asia	BigBang	Won	
Gaon Chart Music Awards	2016	Album of the Year (2nd Quarter)	M	Nominated	
Gaon Chart Music Awards	2016	Album of the Year (3rd Quarter)	E	Nominated	
Gaon Chart Music Awards	2017	Song of the Year (December)	"Fxxk It"	Won	
Gaon Chart Music Awards	2017	Song of the Year (December)	"Last Dance"	Nominated	
Gaon Chart Music Awards	2017	Song of the Year (December)	"Girlfriend"	Nominated	
Gaon Chart Music Awards	2017	Album of the Year (4th Quarter)	Made	Nominated	
Gaon Chart Music Awards	2019	Song of the Year (March)	"Flower Road"	Won	
Genie Music Awards	2022	Song of the Year	"Still Life"	Nominated	
Genie Music Awards	2022	Best Male Group	BigBang	Nominated	
Genie Music Awards	2022	Genie Music Popularity Award	BigBang	Nominated	
Genie Music Awards	2022	Global Popularity Award	BigBang	Nominated	
Golden Disc Awards	2007	Digital Daesang	"Lies"	Nominated	
Golden Disc Awards	2007	Digital Bonsang	"Lies"	Won	
Golden Disc Awards	2008	Digital Bonsang	"Haru Haru"	Nominated	
Golden Disc Awards	2008	Digital Bonsang	"Last Farewell"	Nominated	
Golden Disc Awards	2008	Disc Bonsang	Remember	Nominated	
Golden Disc Awards	2008	Popularity Award	BigBang	Nominated	
Golden Disc Awards	2012	Digital Bonsang	"Tonight"	Nominated	
Golden Disc Awards	2013	Digital Bonsang	"Fantastic Baby"	Won	
Golden Disc Awards	2013	Digital Daesang	"Fantastic Baby"	Nominated	
Golden Disc Awards	2013	MSN International Award	BigBang	Won	
Golden Disc Awards	2016	Digital Daesang	"Loser"	Won	
Golden Disc Awards	2016	Digital Bonsang	"Loser"	Won	
Golden Disc Awards	2016	Global Fan's Choice	BigBang	Nominated	
Golden Disc Awards	2016	iQiyi Best Male Artist	BigBang	Won	
Golden Disc Awards	2018	Digital Bonsang	"Fxxk It"	Won	
Golden Disc Awards	2018	Global Popular Artist Award	BigBang	Nominated	
Golden Disc Awards	2019	Special Digital Bonsang Fans Choice	BigBang	Won	
Golden Disc Awards	2019	NetEase Most Popular K-pop Star	BigBang	Nominated	
Golden Disc Awards	2019	Digital Bonsang	"Flower Road"	Won	
Golden Disc Awards	2019	Digital Daesang	"Flower Road"	Nominated	
Hito Music Awards	2013	Japanese and Asian Song of the Year	"Fantastic Baby"	Won	
InStyle Star Icon Awards	2016	Hot Icon	BigBang	Won	
IFPI Hong Kong Top Sales Music Award	2015	Ten Best Sales Digital Releases	"Bae Bae"	Won	
IFPI Hong Kong Top Sales Music Award	2016	Ten Best Sales Digital Releases	"Loser"	Won	
Japan Cable Broadcasting Award	2009	Best Newcomer Award	BigBang	Won	
Japanese Grand Prix du Disque	2010	Best Newcomer	BigBang	Won	
Japan Music Awards	2025	Artist of the Year	BigBang	Pending	
Japan Music Awards	2025	Album of the Year	The Best of Big Bang 2006–2014	Pending	
Japan Record Awards	2009	New Artist	BigBang	Won	
Japan Record Awards	2009	Best New Artist	BigBang	Won	
Japan Record Awards	2010	Best Song	"Tell Me Goodbye"	Won	
Japan Record Awards	2016	Special Achievement Award	BigBang	Won	
Japan Gold Disc Awards	2010	Best 5 New Artists	BigBang	Won	
Japan Gold Disc Awards	2013	Best 3 Albums (Asian)	Alive	Won	
Japan Gold Disc Awards	2016	Song of the Year by Download (Asia)	"Bang Bang Bang (Korean Ver.)"	Won	
Japan Gold Disc Awards	2017	Best Asian Artist	BigBang	Won	
Japan Gold Disc Awards	2017	Album of the Year	Made Series	Won	
Japan Gold Disc Awards	2017	Best 3 Albums	Made Series	Won	
Japan Gold Disc Awards	2017	Song of the Year by Download (Asia)	"Bang Bang Bang (Japanese Ver.)"	Won	
Japan Gold Disc Awards	2017	Best Music Video	BIGBANG 2015 World Tour～ 2016 [MADE] In Japan	Won	
Japan Gold Disc Awards	2018	Best Asian Artist	BigBang	Won	
Japan Gold Disc Awards	2018	Best 3 Albums	Made	Won	
Japan Gold Disc Awards	2018	Best Music Videos	0.TO.10	Won	
KuGou Annual Music Awards	2023	Best Selling Korean/Japanese Album (top 10)	"Still Life"	Won	
KKBox Music Awards	2016	Annual Korean Singer	BigBang	Won	
KKBox Music Awards	2016	Japan Top 10 Artist (Japanese music)	BigBang	Won	
Korea Broadcast Award	2008	Newcomer Award	BigBang	Won	
Korea Marketing Awards	2015	K-pop Division Grand Prize	BigBang	Won	
Korea National Assembly Awards	2008	Grand Prize	BigBang	Won	
Korea SNS Industry Awards	2015	Korea Internet & Security Agency Award	BigBang	Won	
Korea PD Award	2009	Performer of the Year	BigBang	Won	
Korea First Brand Awards (Note: Established in 2004, the Korea First Brand Awards is an annual awards ceremony hosted by the Korea Consumer Brand Committee and organized by the Korea Consumer Forum.)	2016	Top 10 Hallyu Stars – China	BigBang	Won	
Korean Music Awards	2008	Dance & Electronic Musician Netizen Vote	BigBang	Won	
Korean Music Awards	2015	Artist of the Year	BigBang	Nominated	
Korean Music Awards	2015	Group Musician of the Year Netizen Vote	BigBang	Won	
Korean Music Awards	2015	Song of the Year	"Bae Bae"	Won	
Korean Music Awards	2015	Best Rap & Hip-Hop Song	"Bae Bae"	Nominated	
Korean Music Awards	2015	Best Pop Song	"Loser"	Won	
MAMA Awards	2006	New Group of the Year	"La La La"	Nominated	
MAMA Awards	2007	Best Hip-Hop Song	"Lies"	Nominated	
MAMA Awards	2007	Best Male Group	"Lies"	Won	
MAMA Awards	2007	Song of the Year	"Lies"	Won	
MAMA Awards	2007	Artist of the Year	"Lies"	Nominated	
MAMA Awards	2007	Album of the Year	"Lies"	Nominated	
MAMA Awards	2008	Best House and Electronic Song	"Haru Haru"	Nominated	
MAMA Awards	2008	Best Male Group	"Haru Haru"	Won	
MAMA Awards	2008	Song of the Year	"Haru Haru"	Nominated	
MAMA Awards	2008	Artist of the Year	"Haru Haru"	Won	
MAMA Awards	2009	Best Male Group	"Sunset Glow"	Nominated	
MAMA Awards	2011	Best Music Video	"Love Song"	Won	
MAMA Awards	2011	Best Male Group	"Tonight"	Nominated	
MAMA Awards	2011	Best Dance Performance – Male Group	"Tonight"	Nominated	
MAMA Awards	2011	Song of the Year	"Tonight"	Nominated	
MAMA Awards	2011	Album of the Year	Tonight	Nominated	
MAMA Awards	2011	Artist of the Year	Tonight	Nominated	
MAMA Awards	2012	Best Male Group	"Fantastic Baby"	Won	
MAMA Awards	2012	Best Global Group (Male)	"Fantastic Baby"	Nominated	
MAMA Awards	2012	Guardian Angel	Alive Galaxy Tour	Won	
MAMA Awards	2012	Best Music Video	"Monster"	Nominated	
MAMA Awards	2012	Artist of the Year	BigBang	Won	
MAMA Awards	2012	Album of the Year	Alive	Nominated	
MAMA Awards	2015	Best Dance Performance	"Bang Bang Bang"	Nominated	
MAMA Awards	2015	UnionPay Song of the Year	"Bang Bang Bang"	Won	
MAMA Awards	2015	Best Music Video	"Bae Bae"	Won	
MAMA Awards	2015	Album of the Year	Made	Nominated	
MAMA Awards	2015	Artist of the Year	BigBang	Won	
MAMA Awards	2015	Best Male Group	BigBang	Nominated	
MAMA Awards	2015	Weibo Global Fan's Choice	BigBang	Nominated	
MAMA Awards	2015	IQiyi Worldwide Favourite Artist	BigBang	Won	
MAMA Awards	2022	Worldwide Fans Choice	BigBang	Nominated	
MAMA Awards	2022	Song of the Year	"Still Life"	Nominated	
MAMA Awards	2022	Best Vocal Performance – Group	"Still Life"	Won	
MAMA Awards	2026	Artist of the Year	BIGBANG	Nominated	
MAMA Awards	2026	Music Visionary of the Year	BIGBANG	Won	
MAMA Awards	2026	Fans' Choice Top 10 – Male	BIGBANG	Won	
MAMA Awards	2026	Best Male Group	BIGBANG	Nominated	
MAMA Awards	2026	Best Music Video	"BiiiG"	Won	
MAMA Awards	2026	Best Dance Performance – Male Group	"BiiiG"	Nominated	
Melon Music Awards	2011	Album of the Year	Tonight	Nominated	
Melon Music Awards	2011	Top 10 Artists	BigBang	Won	
Melon Music Awards	2012	Top 10 Artists	BigBang	Won	
Melon Music Awards	2012	Album of the Year	Alive	Nominated	
Melon Music Awards	2012	Artist of the Year	BigBang	Nominated	
Melon Music Awards	2012	Song of the Year	"Fantastic Baby"	Nominated	
Melon Music Awards	2012	Global Star Award	"Fantastic Baby"	Nominated	
Melon Music Awards	2012	Netizen Popularity Battle Award	"Fantastic Baby"	Nominated	
Melon Music Awards	2015	Album of the Year	M	Nominated	
Melon Music Awards	2015	Artist of the Year	BigBang	Won	
Melon Music Awards	2015	Top 10 Artists	BigBang	Won	
Melon Music Awards	2015	Song of the Year	"Bang Bang Bang"	Won	
Melon Music Awards	2015	Netizen Popularity Award	"Bang Bang Bang"	Won	
Melon Music Awards	2017	Top 10 Artists	BigBang	Won	
Melon Music Awards	2017	Best Artist Award	BigBang	Nominated	
Melon Music Awards	2017	Netizen Popularity Award	BigBang	Nominated	
Melon Music Awards	2017	Album of the Year	Made	Nominated	
Melon Music Awards	2017	Song of the Year	"Fxxk It"	Nominated	
Melon Music Awards	2018	Netizen Popularity Award	BigBang	Nominated	
Melon Music Awards	2018	Song of the Year	"Flower Road"	Nominated	
Melon Music Awards	2018	Best R&B/Soul	"Flower Road"	Nominated	
Melon Music Awards	2022	Song of the Year	"Still Life"	Nominated	
Melon Music Awards	2022	Best Male Group	BigBang	Nominated	
Melon Music Awards	2022	Netizen Popularity Award	BigBang	Nominated	
Melon Music Awards	2026	Global TOP10	BigBang	Nominated	
Mnet 20's Choice Awards	2008	Hot Trend Musician	BigBang	Won	
Mnet 20's Choice Awards	2009	Hot Commercial Film Star	"Lollipop" (with 2NE1)	Won	
Mnet 20's Choice Awards	2011	Hot Trend Musician	BigBang	Nominated	
Mnet 20's Choice Awards	2012	Hot Trend Musician	BigBang	Nominated	
MTV Asia Awards	2008	Favorite Artist Korea	BigBang	Nominated	
MTV Europe Music Awards	2011	Best Worldwide Act	BigBang	Won	
MTV Europe Music Awards	2011	Best Asia Act	BigBang	Won	
MTV Iggy	2015	Song of the Summer	"Bang Bang Bang"	Won	
MTV Italian Music Awards	2012	Best Fan	BigBang	Won	
MTV Italian Music Awards	2016	Best Artist From The World	BigBang	Won	
MTV Millennial Awards Brazil	2018	Kpop Explosion	BigBang	Nominated	
MTV Video Music Awards Japan	2010	Best New Artist Video	"Gara Gara Go"	Won	
MTV Video Music Awards Japan	2010	Best Pop Video	"Koe wo Kikasete"	Won	
MTV Video Music Awards Japan	2013	Best Dance Video	"Fantastic Baby"	Won	
Myx Music Awards	2012	Favorite K-Pop Video	"Tonight"	Nominated	
Myx Music Awards	2013	Favorite K-Pop Video	"Monster"	Nominated	
Nickelodeon Korea Kids' Choice Awards	2008	Favorite Male Singer	BigBang	Won	
Nickelodeon Korea Kids' Choice Awards	2009	Favorite Male Singer	BigBang	Won	
Nickelodeon Kids' Choice Awards	2017	Favorite Global Music Star	BigBang	Nominated	
Premios Cultura Asiática 2020	2020	Major K-Pop Legend	BigBang	Nominated	
QQ Music Awards	2015	Most Popular Overseas Group	BigBang	Won	
QQ Music Awards	2016	Most Popular Overseas Group	BigBang	Won	
QQ Music Awards	2016	Best Selling Foreign Album	BigBang	Won	
QQ Music Awards	2016	Best Music Video of the Year	"Bang Bang Bang"	Won	
RTHK International Pop Poll Awards	2013	Top Group / Band	BigBang	Gold	
RTHK International Pop Poll Awards	2013	Top Ten International Gold Songs	"Fantastic Baby"	Won	
RTHK International Pop Poll Awards	2016	Top Group / Band	BigBang	Gold	
RTHK International Pop Poll Awards	2016	Top Ten International Gold Songs	"Bang Bang Bang"	Won	
RTHK International Pop Poll Awards	2016	Best Selling Korean Album	E	Won	
RTHK International Pop Poll Awards	2018	Best Selling Albums	Made	Won	
Seoul Music Awards	2008	Daesang Award	BigBang	Won	
Seoul Music Awards	2008	Bonsang Award	BigBang	Won	
Seoul Music Awards	2008	Best Song Award	"Lies"	Won	
Seoul Music Awards	2009	Best Album Award	Remember	Won	
Seoul Music Awards	2009	Bonsang Award	BigBang	Won	
Seoul Music Awards	2009	Mobile Popularity Award	BigBang	Won	
Seoul Music Awards	2009	High One Music Award	BigBang	Won	
Seoul Music Awards	2012	Bonsang Award	Tonight	Nominated	
Seoul Music Awards	2012	Popularity Award	BigBang	Nominated	
Seoul Music Awards	2013	Bonsang Award	BigBang	Won	
Seoul Music Awards	2016	Best Song Award	"Bang Bang Bang"	Won	
Seoul Music Awards	2016	Popularity Award	BigBang	Nominated	
Seoul Music Awards	2016	Bonsang Award	BigBang	Won	
Seoul Music Awards	2023	Bonsang Award	BigBang	Nominated	
Seoul Music Awards	2023	K-wave Award	BigBang	Nominated	
Seoul Music Awards	2023	Popularity Award	BigBang	Nominated	
Singapore E-Awards	2011	Most Popular Korean Artist	BigBang	Won	
Singapore E-Awards	2012	Most Popular Korean Artist	BigBang	Nominated	
Singapore E-Awards	2013	Most Popular Korean Artist	BigBang	Nominated	
Singapore E-Awards	2013	Most Popular Music Video (K-pop)	"Fantastic Baby"	Nominated	
Singapore E-Awards	2012	Platinum Awards	Tonight Special Edition	Won	
Singapore E-Awards	2012	Double Platinum Awards	Alive	Won	
So-Loved Awards (Note: The So-Loved Awards is a German K-pop award event sponsored by the Korea Foundation for International Cultural Exchange (KOFICE).)	2012	Best Male Group	BigBang	Won	
So-Loved Awards	2012	Best Song	"Fantastic Baby"	Won	
So-Loved Awards	2012	Best Mini Album	Still Alive	Won	
Soompi Awards	2015	Best Male Group	BigBang	Won	
Soompi Awards	2015	Artist of the Year	BigBang	Won	
Soompi Awards	2015	Album of the Year	E	Won	
Soompi Awards	2015	Best Music Video	"Bae Bae"	Nominated	
Soompi Awards	2017	Best Male Group	BigBang	Nominated	
Soompi Awards	2017	Artist of the Year	BigBang	Nominated	
Soompi Awards	2017	Song of the Year	"Fxxk It"	Nominated	
Soompi Awards	2017	Album of the Year	Made	Nominated	
Soompi Awards	2018	Song of the Year	"Flower Road"	Nominated	
Space Shower Music Video Awards	2010	Best Choreography Video	"Gara Gara Go!"	Won	
Style Icon Awards	2008	Male Pop Act	BigBang	Won	
Tencent Music Entertainment Awards	2023	Digital Single of the Year	"Still Life"	Won	
UN Asia Pacific Global Tolerance with Music	2010	Global Unity Award	BigBang	Won	
V-Live Awards	2017	Global Artist Top 10	BigBang	Won	
V-Live Awards	2018	Global Artist Top 10	BigBang	Won	
World Music Awards (Note: The World Music Awards was an international awards show founded in 1989 that annually honored recording artists based on worldwide sales figures provided by the International Federation of the Phonographic Industry (IFPI). The show is broadcast to North and South America, all of Europe, the Middle East, most of Asia, and all of Africa, reaching an estimated worldwide audience of around one billion viewers in over 160 countries. The last World Music Awards show was on May 27, 2014 in Monte Carlo.)	2014	World's Best Group	BigBang	Won	
World Music Awards	2014	World's Best Live Act	Big Bang Alive Galaxy Tour 2012	Won	
World Music Awards	2014	World's Best Video of the Year	"Fantastic Baby"	Won	
YouTube Music Awards	2015	Honored Artist	BigBang	Won	

== Other accolades ==
=== State honors ===
Name of country, year given, and name of honor
Country	Year	Honor	Ref.
South Korea (Note: Honors are given at the Korean Popular Culture and Arts Awards, arranged by the Korea Creative Content Agency and hosted by the Ministry of Culture, Sports and Tourism. They are awarded to those who have contributed to the arts and South Korea's pop culture.)	2010	Minister of Culture, Sports and Tourism Commendation	

=== Listicles ===
Name of publisher, year listed, name of listicle, and placement
Publisher	Year	Listicle	Placement	Ref.
The Dong-a Ilbo	2016	Best Male Artists According to Experts	1st	
Forbes	2009	Korea Power Celebrity 40	2nd	
Forbes	2010	Korea Power Celebrity 40	5th	
Forbes	2011	Korea Power Celebrity 40	28th	
Forbes	2012	Korea Power Celebrity 40	2nd	
Forbes	2013	Korea Power Celebrity 40	5th	
Forbes	2014	Korea Power Celebrity 40	2nd	
Forbes	2015	Korea Power Celebrity 40	23rd	
Forbes	2016	Korea Power Celebrity 40	6th	
Forbes	2016	Celebrity 100	54th	
Forbes	2017	30 Under 30 Music	Placed	
Golden Disc Awards	2025	Golden Disc Powerhouse 40	Placed	
IZM	2025	The 25 Greatest Musicians of the first 25 Years of the 21st Century	Placed	
