= Made V.I.P Tour =

2016 concert tour by Big Bang

- Fan meeting tour by BigBang
- Made V.I.P Tour Poster
- Location: Asia; Oceania
- Associated album: M; A; D; E
- Start date: March 11, 2016
- End date: October 22, 2016
- No. of shows: 41

BigBang concert chronology
- Fantastic Babys (2012–16); Made V.I.P Tour (2016); Big Bang Special Event (2016–17)

The Made V.I.P Tour is the first Asian fan meeting tour by South Korean boy band BigBang, in support of their single albums M, A, D and E, released in 2015. The tour attracted over 650,000 people in mainland China alone, breaking BigBang's own record for the most attended tour by a foreign language act of all time in China. Their event in Luoyang, China attracted over 45,000 people broke their previous record for the largest audience drawn by a foreign language act of all time in China.

BigBang was the highest earning act in mainland China from concert revenue in 2016, surpassing acts like Jay Chou and Eason Chan, by earning US$70.3 million from 36 concerts, accounting for 70% of the total box office of South Korean acts in China.

== Background ==
On February 6, 2016, YG Entertainment announced the first leg of the tour in Mainland China, with shows in Shanghai, Shenzhen, Zhengzhou, Hangzhou, Hefei, Changsha, Nanchang and Nanjing. In May 2016, the second leg was announced with the addition of eight more cities including Shenyang, Foshan, Nanning, Qingdao, Harbin, Dalian, Chongqing and Chengdu. Six additional shows at the end of May were announced in Hong Kong and Taiwan.

On June 12, two shows were announced for Guangzhou on July 7 and 8, and a third show was added after the first two shows sold-out. On June 16, tickets for the Hong Kong shows were put on sale. An overwhelming response followed with all tickets for three shows being sold out in under an hour, leading to a fourth show being added on July 24. At the end of June, a third show had been added in both Chongqing and Beijing, and a new show in Luoyang was announced.

On July 7, it was announced that the tour would visit Macau, with two shows at CotaiArena. The tickets for Taiwan went on sale on July 9. The ticketing website's system experienced heavy traffic causing an immediate crash, and ticket sales were postponed to a later date.

On August 12, it was announced that the fan meeting will expand to Honolulu, and marks the first time for the group to hold a fan meeting in America. On August 29 and 30, it was announced that the tour would visit Malaysia and Singapore on October 1 and 2.

The tour promoters announced that T.O.P would not be able to attend the shows in Taiwan, Malaysia and Singapore due to scheduling conflicts.

== Set list ==
1. "Loser"
2. "Bang Bang Bang"
3. "If You"
4. "Bad Boy"
5. "Strong Baby" (Seungri)
6. "Look at Me, Gwisun" (Daesung)
7. "Doom Dada" (T.O.P)
8. "Eyes, Nose, Lips" (Taeyang)
9. "Crooked" (G-Dragon)
10. "Good Boy" (GD X Taeyang)
11. "Sober"

Encore

1. "Bae Bae"
13. "We Like 2 Party"
14. "Fantastic Baby"

== Dates ==
List of concert dates
Date	City	Country	Venue	Attendance
March 11, 2016	Shanghai	China	Mercedes-Benz Arena	182,000
March 12, 2016 (2 shows)	Shanghai	China	Mercedes-Benz Arena	182,000
March 13, 2016	Shenzhen	China	Shenzhen Bay Sports Center	182,000
March 17, 2016	Zhengzhou	China	Henan Sports Center	182,000
March 19, 2016	Nanjing	China	Nanjing Olympic Sports Center Gymnasium	182,000
March 20, 2016	Hefei	China	Hefei Olympic Sports Center Stadium	182,000
March 24, 2016	Hangzhou	China	Huanglong Stadium	182,000
March 25, 2016	Nanchang	China	Nanchang Int'l Sports Center Stadium	182,000
March 26, 2016	Changsha	China	Helong Stadium	182,000
June 5, 2016	Tianjin	China	Tianjin Olympic Center Stadium	—
June 10, 2016	Foshan	China	Foshan Century Lotus Sports Center	110,000
June 12, 2016	Nanning	China	Guangxi Sports Center Main Stadium	110,000
June 24, 2016	Harbin	China	HICEC Stadium	110,000
June 26, 2016	Dalian	China	Damai Center	110,000
June 30, 2016	Chongqing	China	Chongqing International Expo Center	110,000
July 1, 2016	Chongqing	China	Chongqing International Expo Center	110,000
July 2, 2016	Chongqing	China	Chongqing International Expo Center	110,000
July 3, 2016	Chengdu	China	Chengdu Sports Centre	110,000
July 7, 2016	Guangzhou	China	Guangzhou International Sports Arena	—
July 8, 2016	Guangzhou	China	Guangzhou International Sports Arena	—
July 9, 2016	Guangzhou	China	Guangzhou International Sports Arena	—
July 10, 2016	Xuzhou	China	Xuzhou Olympic Sports Centre Stadium	—
July 12, 2016	Xi'an	China	Shaanxi Province Stadium	—
July 13, 2016	Luoyang	China	Luoyang City Sports Center Stadium	45,000
July 15, 2016	Beijing	China	LeSports Center	—
July 16, 2016	Beijing	China	LeSports Center	—
July 17, 2016	Beijing	China	LeSports Center	—
July 21, 2016	Zhongshan	China	Zhongshan Sports Center Stadium	—
July 22, 2016	Hong Kong	China	AsiaWorld–Arena	—
July 23, 2016	Hong Kong	China	AsiaWorld–Arena	—
July 24, 2016 (2 shows)	Hong Kong	China	AsiaWorld–Arena	—
September 3, 2016	Macau	China	Cotai Arena	—
September 4, 2016	Macau	China	Cotai Arena	—
September 9, 2016	Taoyuan	Taiwan	NTSU Arena	10,000
September 10, 2016	Taoyuan	Taiwan	NTSU Arena	10,000
September 11, 2016	Kaohsiung	Taiwan	Kaohsiung Arena	—
October 1, 2016	Kuala Lumpur	Malaysia	Stadium Merdeka	30,000
October 2, 2016	Singapore		Singapore Indoor Stadium	7,000
October 22, 2016	Honolulu	United States	Neal S. Blaisdell Center	6,000
Total				650,000

== Cancelled dates ==
List of cancelled dates
Date	City	Country	Venue	Reason
June 3, 2016	Shenyang	China	Shenyang Olympic Sports Center Stadium	Unforeseen circumstances
June 25, 2016	Dalian	China	Dalian Arena	Unforeseen circumstances
July 7, 2016	Jinan	China	—N/a	Unforeseen circumstances
June 19, 2016	Qingdao	China	Qingdao Conson Stadium	Unforeseen circumstances
September 10, 2016 (2PM)	Taipei	Taiwan	NTU Sports Center	Unforeseen circumstances
October 29, 2016	Bangkok	Thailand	Impact Arena	King Bhumibol Adulyadej's passing
October 30, 2016	Bangkok	Thailand	Impact Arena	King Bhumibol Adulyadej's passing

== Box office score data ==
Venue	City	Tickets Sold / Available	Gross Revenue
Mercedes-Benz Arena	Shanghai, China	45,000 / 45,000 (100%)	$7,342,156
