= Made World Tour =

2015–16 concert tour by Big Bang

- Tour by Big Bang
- Big Bang Made Tour 2015 Official Poster
- Location: Asia; Oceania; North America
- Associated album: Made
- Start date: April 25, 2015
- End date: March 6, 2016
- Legs: 4
- No. of shows: 66

Big Bang concert chronology
- Japan Dome Tour "X" (2014–15); Made World Tour (2015–16); 0.TO.10 (2016–17)

The Made World Tour was the second worldwide concert tour and ninth overall by South Korean boy band Big Bang, in support of their third Korean-language studio album Made (2016). The tour began on April 25, 2015, and concluded on March 6, 2016, in Seoul, South Korea. It visited 15 countries including China, Japan, Australia, Mexico, and the United States.

== Background ==
The tour was first announced on April 1, 2015, with the announcement of the first two concerts in Seoul on April 25 and 26. On April 16, the first trailer of the tour was released on YouTube. On April 27, the remainder of the Asian leg was revealed with a total of 30 shows. In July, nine shows were confirmed in Mexico, Australia, Canada, Taiwan and Macau. It was the first time for the group to visit Mexico, Australia, Canada and Macau.

It was also revealed a highly acclaimed crew would be joining the tour, including LeRoy Bennett, Ed Burke, Gil Smith II, and Jonathan Lia. They previously worked with Beyoncé and Jay-Z on their On The Run Tour as well as with BigBang during their Alive Galaxy Tour.

== Commercial performance ==
In Asia, following the announcement of the tour, the first shows in Seoul sold out in a matter of minutes, resulting in server crashes due to high traffic. In Mainland China, BigBang gathered a record-breaking 280,000 people in attendance from 13 shows, making the tour the most attended concert tour by a foreign act of all time in China, with three sold-out shows in Shanghai making BigBang the only Korean act to hold three concerts in a row at Mercedes-Benz Arena and sold-out show in Chengdu, as BigBang held the largest audience drew by a Korean act for a single concert in China with 30,000 attending the show. Further sold-out shows were held in Guangzhou, Beijing, Dalian and Wuhan.

In Hong Kong, all three shows sold out in less than two hours after they went on sale, making BigBang the first non-Chinese singer to sell out three concerts in Hong Kong on two separate occasions The Macau two night concerts sold out within 3 hours, leading to a third show being added. It made them the first ever foreign artist group to hold three consecutive shows at the Cotai Arena, attracting over 28,598 fans with gross $5.3 million, and ranked the group at number 41 on the Top 100 International Box office Grosses of the year at Pollstars year end list.

In Singapore, demand was so high that "audio seats" were put on sale after regular tickets quickly sold out. In Malaysia, hundreds of fans lined up in advance to purchase tickets for the July 25 concert, which eventually sold out in a matter of hours. Due to high demand, a second show was added on July 24, making them the first Korean act to hold a two-day concert in Kuala Lumpur.

In Japan, BigBang became the first foreign artist holding a dome tour for the third consecutive year, the tour sold out and 4 new shows added in Tokyo Dome and Fukuoka Dome due to high demand. the tour that drew 911,000 fans in Japan making it the most attended concert tour by a foreign act of all time in the country. In Australia, a second show was added in Sydney after high demand, the tour became the highest-grossing and most-attended tour by Korean artists in the country. with $5.8 million from 35,000 tickets sold in 3 shows.

In North America, the tour became the most attended tour by Korean act as it was listed on Pollstar's year end list, on the Top 200 North American Tours, BigBang ranked at number 126 and earned $7.8 million from four reported shows. In Mexico they performed their most-attended concert outside Asia with 19,141 tickets sold at Mexico City Arena. In Canada, they performed in front of 14,000 fans making it the attended concert by a Korean act of all time in the country. In the United States the tour became the most attended concert tour by a Korean act of all time at the time. BigBang ended the tour with three encore shows in Seoul selling 38,000 tickets within 10 minutes. A total of around 1,500,000 fans attended the tour, making it the biggest tour made by Korean act.

== Critical reception ==
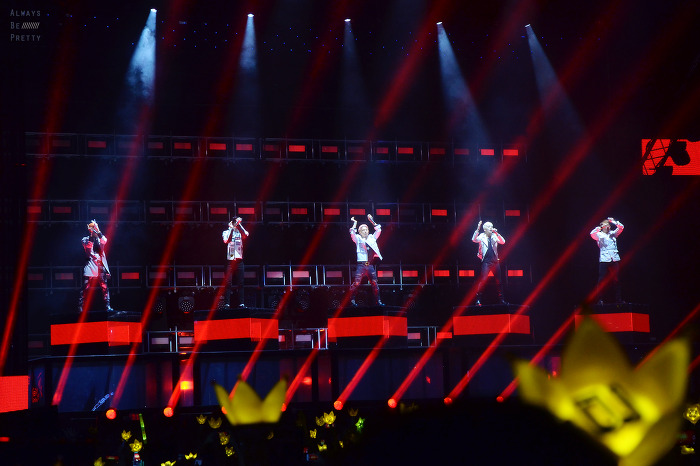
Big Bang performing in Dalian, China

The tour received universal acclaim from music critics. Jon Caramanica from The New York Times called BigBang the "Smooth K-Pop Criminals" and described the concert as an "extreme, intense, overwhelming Korean pop carnival", listing it as one of the best tours in 2015. Bryan Armen Graham of The Guardian gave the Newark concert four out of five stars and begin his review by saying BigBang deliver fully realised pop at its sophisticated peak, describing it as "K-pop heroes delivering candyfloss hooks with a sharp edge" while praising all five members' individual talents. The Los Angeles Times described BigBang as "One of the most inventive, aesthetically visionary acts in its genre" and called their Anaheim concert an "incredibly significant moment for K-Pop", praising the diversity of their songs and performances. Grantland's Rembert Browne remarked that BigBang is "a boy band that in reality is a supergroup", praising each member's musical idiosyncrasies, saying "It's terrifying how good each member is". Billboard gave the concert a 4.5/5, calling BigBang "five individuals that are separately complex, but together an undeniable supergroup" and stating how the group are still redefining what a boy band is today, and how they shine as a collective and on an individual, human basis.

Other reviews from the tour included Maria Sherman writing for The Village Voice. Sherman described the show as unique and "unlike anything in the western pop schema" saying that the concert "served to reflect the rainbow spectrum of human emotion". Julianne Shepherd of the Jezebel described the concert as "the true definition of a spectacular" and stated they "have never seen a group nail being a boy band the way Big Bang did, playing up each member's individual strengths and personalities but also flawless when it came time to come together as a unit". David Lee from the Vibe called BigBang the "Kings of K-Pop" and praised their solo performances as the most interesting moments of the night, and naming the solo stages of the members as one of the most interesting moments of the night, praising the group solo diversity from giving nightclub vibes with Seungri, Daesung's feel-good rock anthem, T.O.P's rebellion stage, Taeyang's ballad hit to G-Dragon ending it with pop song, and described it as an "amazing thing to witness".

Gwendolyn Ng writing for The Straits Times opened the review with "Big Bang brings on the party with fancy moves, solid vocals and off-the-wall humour", and the live performance was "explosive" and stated that "Their solid vocals powered them through emotive ballads, high octane dance tunes and fiery rapping". Siau Ming En from Today Online wrote on their review that the megastars BigBang "wowed the Singapore crowd with not just their powerhouse moves on stage but also their seasoned and cheeky banter. Melanie Leung of the South China Morning Post began her article stating concert as the "Hong Kong's most anticipated show of the year", praising "Their sleek costumes stood out against the blasting fireworks, and every dance move was slick as they delivered a string of hits".

== Live stream ==
On December 2, 2014 YG Entertainment held a press conference in Hong Kong to announce a partnership with Tencent's QQ Music, the largest online music service in Mainland China. On June 20, 2015, during a joint press conference, YG Entertainment and Tencent announced the latter would exclusively live stream BigBang's concert in Shanghai the following night through Tencent's live concert streaming service, Live Music. On October 25, Tencent's Live Music held a second livestream for the concert in Macau which saw more than 120,000 paid viewers online, hitting a new domestic record for the number of paid online viewers.

The final concert in Seoul was aired live via Tencent's Live Music in Mainland China and Naver's V App internationally, with a total of six separate live-streams: five following each member and one showing the entire group. On the V app, the concert recorded 3.62 million views (total views from six different live-streams).

== Set list ==
Set list of the first show in Seoul
1. "Fantastic Baby"
2. "Tonight"
3. "Stupid Liar"
4. "Haru Haru"
5. "How Gee"
6. "Feeling"
7. "Loser"
8. "Blue"
9. "Bad Boy"
10. "Cafe"
11. "Lies"
12. "Strong Baby" (Seungri)
13. "Let's Talk About Love" (Seungri ft: G-Dragon & Taeyang)
14. "Wings" (Daesung)
15. "Doom Dada" (T.O.P)
16. "Eyes, Nose, Lips" (Taeyang)
17. "Good Boy" (G-Dragon & Taeyang)
18. "Crooked" (G-Dragon)
19. "Bae Bae"
20. "Last Farewell"

Encore

1. "Hands Up"
2. "Heaven"

Re-Encore

1. "Bae Bae"
2. "Fantastic Baby"
3. "Loser"
Set list in Beijing, after the release of Made Series A
1. "Bang Bang Bang"
2. "Tonight"
3. "Stupid Liar"
4. "Haru Haru"
5. "How Gee"
6. "Feeling"
7. "Loser"
8. "Blue"
9. "Bad Boy"
10. "Cafe"
11. "Lies"
12. "Strong Baby" (Seungri)
13. "Let's Talk About Love" (Seungri ft: G-Dragon & Taeyang)
14. "Wings" (Daesung)
15. "Doom Dada" (T.O.P)
16. "Eyes, Nose, Lips" (Taeyang)
17. "Good Boy" (G-Dragon & Taeyang)
18. "Crooked" (G-Dragon)
19. "Bae Bae"
20. "Fantastic Baby"

Encore

1. "We Like 2 Party"
2. "Hands Up"

Re-Encore

1. "Bang Bang Bang"
2. "Fantastic Baby"
3. "Bae Bae"
Set list in Thailand, after the release of Made Series D
1. "Bang Bang Bang"
2. "Tonight"
3. "Stupid Liar"
4. "Haru Haru"
5. "Loser"
6. "Blue"
7. "Bad Boy"
8. "If You"
9. "Lies"
10. "Strong Baby" (Seungri)
11. "Let's Talk About Love" (Seungri ft: G-Dragon & Taeyang)
12. "Wings" (Daesung)
13. "Doom Dada" (T.O.P)
14. "Eyes, Nose, Lips" (Taeyang)
15. "Good Boy" (G-Dragon & Taeyang)
16. "Crooked" (G-Dragon)
17. "Sober"
18. "Bae Bae"
19. "Fantastic Baby"

Encore

1. "We Like 2 Party"
2. "Hands Up"

Re-Encore (flexible, these represent the ones from Singapore Day 2)

1. "Bang Bang Bang"
2. "Good Boy"
3. "Bae Bae"
Set list in Chengdu, after the release of Made Series E
1. "Bang Bang Bang"
2. "Tonight"
3. "Stupid Liar"
4. "Haru Haru"
5. "Loser"
6. "Let's Not Fall in Love"
7. "Bad Boy"
8. "If You"
9. "Lies"
10. "Strong Baby" (Seungri)
11. "Wings" (Daesung)
12. "Doom Dada" (T.O.P)
13. "Eyes Nose Lips" (Taeyang)
14. "Zutter" (G-Dragon & T.O.P)
15. "Good Boy" (G-Dragon & Taeyang)
16. "Crooked" (G-Dragon)
17. "Sober"
18. "Bae Bae"
19. "Fantastic Baby"

Encore

1. "We Like 2 Party"

Re-Encore

1. "Bang Bang Bang"
2. "Bae Bae"
Set list of the final show in Seoul
1. "Bang Bang Bang"
2. "Tonight"
3. "Stupid Liar"
4. "Haru Haru"
5. "Loser"
6. "Blue"
7. "Bad Boy"
8. "If You"
9. "Strong Baby" (Seungri)
10. "Wings" (Daesung)
11. "Doom Dada" (T.O.P)
12. "Eyes, Nose, Lips" (Taeyang)
13. "Zutter" (G-Dragon & T.O.P)
14. "Good Boy" (G-Dragon & Taeyang)
15. "Crooked" (G-Dragon)
16. "Sober"
17. "Bae Bae"
18. "Fantastic Baby"

Encore

1. "We Like 2 Party"

Re-Encore

1. "Lies"
2. "Bang Bang Bang"
3. "Bae Bae"

== Tour dates ==
List of concert dates
| Date | City | Country | Venue | Attendance |
|---|---|---|---|---|
| April 25, 2015 | Seoul | South Korea | Olympic Gymnastics Arena | 26,000 |
| April 26, 2015 | Seoul | South Korea | Olympic Gymnastics Arena | 26,000 |
| May 30, 2015 | Guangzhou | China | Guangzhou International Sports Arena | 24,000 |
| May 31, 2015 | Guangzhou | China | Guangzhou International Sports Arena | 24,000 |
| June 6, 2015 | Beijing | China | MasterCard Center | 20,000 |
| June 7, 2015 | Beijing | China | MasterCard Center | 20,000 |
| June 12, 2015 | Hong Kong | | AsiaWorld–Arena | 32,000 |
| June 13, 2015 | Hong Kong | | AsiaWorld–Arena | 32,000 |
| June 14, 2015 | Hong Kong | | AsiaWorld–Arena | 32,000 |
| June 19, 2015 | Shanghai | China | Mercedes-Benz Arena | 30,000 |
| June 20, 2015 | Shanghai | China | Mercedes-Benz Arena | 30,000 |
| June 21, 2015 | Shanghai | China | Mercedes-Benz Arena | 30,000 |
| June 26, 2015 | Dalian | China | Zhongsheng Center | 10,000 |
| June 28, 2015 | Wuhan | China | Wuhan Sports Center Gymnasium | 10,000 |
| July 11, 2015 | Bangkok | Thailand | Impact Arena | 20,000 |
| July 12, 2015 | Bangkok | Thailand | Impact Arena | 20,000 |
| July 18, 2015 | Singapore | | Singapore Indoor Stadium | 20,000 |
| July 19, 2015 | Singapore | | Singapore Indoor Stadium | 20,000 |
| July 24, 2015 | Kuala Lumpur | Malaysia | Putra Indoor Stadium | 40,000 |
| July 25, 2015 | Kuala Lumpur | Malaysia | Putra Indoor Stadium | 40,000 |
| July 30, 2015 | Manila | Philippines | SM Mall of Asia Arena | 40,000 |
| August 1, 2015 | Jakarta | Indonesia | Indonesia Convention Exhibition | 40,000 |
| August 7, 2015 | Shenzhen | China | Shenzhen Bay Sports Center | 12,000 |
| August 9, 2015 | Nanjing | China | Nanjing Olympic Sports Center Gymnasium | 10,000 |
| August 14, 2015 | Chengdu | China | Chengdu Sports Centre | 30,000 |
| August 25, 2015 | Hangzhou | China | Yellow Dragon Sports Center | 21,000 |
| August 28, 2015 | Changsha | China | Hunan Int'l Convention & Exhibition Centre | 7,000 |
| August 30, 2015 | Chongqing | China | Chongqing International Expo Center | 10,000 |
| September 24, 2015 | Taipei | Taiwan | Taipei Arena | 41,000 |
| September 25, 2015 | Taipei | Taiwan | Taipei Arena | 41,000 |
| September 26, 2015 | Taipei | Taiwan | Taipei Arena | 41,000 |
| September 27, 2015 | Taipei | Taiwan | Taipei Arena | 41,000 |
| October 2, 2015 | Las Vegas | United States | Mandalay Bay Events Center | 10,000 |
| October 3, 2015 | Los Angeles | United States | Staples Center | 13,400 |
| October 4, 2015 | Anaheim | United States | Honda Center | 11,000 |
| October 7, 2015 | Mexico City | Mexico | Mexico City Arena | 19,141 |
| October 10, 2015 | Newark | United States | Prudential Center | 22,000 |
| October 11, 2015 | Newark | United States | Prudential Center | 22,000 |
| October 13, 2015 | Toronto | Canada | Air Canada Centre | 14,000 |
| October 17, 2015 | Sydney | Australia | Qudos Bank Arena | 35,000 |
| October 18, 2015 | Sydney | Australia | Qudos Bank Arena | 35,000 |
| October 21, 2015 | Melbourne | Australia | Rod Laver Arena | 35,000 |
| October 23, 2015 | Macau | | Cotai Arena | 28,600 |
| October 24, 2015 | Macau | | Cotai Arena | 28,600 |
| October 25, 2015 | Macau | | Cotai Arena | 28,600 |
| November 12, 2015 | Tokyo | Japan | Tokyo Dome | 910,000 |
| November 13, 2015 | Tokyo | Japan | Tokyo Dome | 910,000 |
| November 14, 2015 | Tokyo | Japan | Tokyo Dome | 910,000 |
| November 15, 2015 | Tokyo | Japan | Tokyo Dome | 910,000 |
| November 20, 2015 | Osaka | Japan | Kyocera Dome | 910,000 |
| November 21, 2015 | Osaka | Japan | Kyocera Dome | 910,000 |
| November 22, 2015 | Osaka | Japan | Kyocera Dome | 910,000 |
| November 28, 2015 | Fukuoka | Japan | Fukuoka Dome | 910,000 |
| November 29, 2015 | Fukuoka | Japan | Fukuoka Dome | 910,000 |
| December 5, 2015 | Nagoya | Japan | Nagoya Dome | 910,000 |
| December 6, 2015 | Nagoya | Japan | Nagoya Dome | 910,000 |
| January 9, 2016 | Osaka | Japan | Kyocera Dome | 910,000 |
| January 10, 2016 | Osaka | Japan | Kyocera Dome | 910,000 |
| January 11, 2016 | Osaka | Japan | Kyocera Dome | 910,000 |
| February 6, 2016 | Fukuoka | Japan | Fukuoka Dome | 910,000 |
| February 7, 2016 | Fukuoka | Japan | Fukuoka Dome | 910,000 |
| February 23, 2016 | Tokyo | Japan | Tokyo Dome | 910,000 |
| February 24, 2016 | Tokyo | Japan | Tokyo Dome | 910,000 |
| March 4, 2016 | Seoul | South Korea | Olympic Gymnastics Arena | 38,000 |
| March 5, 2016 | Seoul | South Korea | Olympic Gymnastics Arena | 38,000 |
| March 6, 2016 | Seoul | South Korea | Olympic Gymnastics Arena | 38,000 |
| Total | | | | 1,500,000 |

== Cancelled shows ==
| Date | City | Country | Venue | Reason |
|---|---|---|---|---|
| August 16, 2015 | Yanji | China | Yanji People's Stadium | Unforeseen circumstance |

== Box office score data ==
| Venue | City | Tickets sold / available | Gross revenue |
|---|---|---|---|
| Staples Center | Los Angeles, California | 13,361 / 13,535 (99%) | $1,715,587 |
| Prudential Center | Newark, New Jersey | 21,903 (91%) | $3,397,699 |
| Cotai Arena | Macau | 28,598 (98%) | $5,311,145 |
| Taipei Arena | Taipei, Taiwan | 44,000 (100%) | $8,010,660 |

== Personnel ==
Credits adapted from the 2016 Bigbang World Tour [Made] Final In Seoul DVD.

Creative directors

- LeRoy A. Bennett
- Ed Burke

Video content

- Jonathan Lia – Producer
- Ed Burke – Creative direction
- Dikayl Rimmasch – Director

Band

- BigBang (G-Dragon, T.O.P, Taeyang, Daesung, Seungri) – Lead vocals
- Gil Smith II – Music director/Keyboard 1
- Adrian Porter – Pro Tools Programmer
- Omar Dominick – AMD/Bass
- Bennie Rodgers II – Drums/Percussions
- Justin Lyons – Guitar
- Dante Jackson – Keyboard 2

Dancers

- Hi-Tec
  - Park Jung Heon
  - Kim Byoung Gon
  - Kwon Young Deuk
  - Kwon Young Don
  - Lee Young Sang
  - Lee Han Sol
- Crazy
  - Won Ah Yeon
  - Park Eun Young
  - Kim Min Jung
  - Kim Hee Yun
  - Choi Hye Jin
  - Oh Hye Ryeon

Show

- Lee Jae Wook – Choreographer
- Chris Grant – Co-choreographer
- Jeung Chi Young – Concert director
- Gee Eun – Visual director/stylist
- Kim Tae Hyun – Hair stylist
- Lim Hea Kyung – Make-up artist
- Hwangssabu – Personal trainer

== Gallery ==
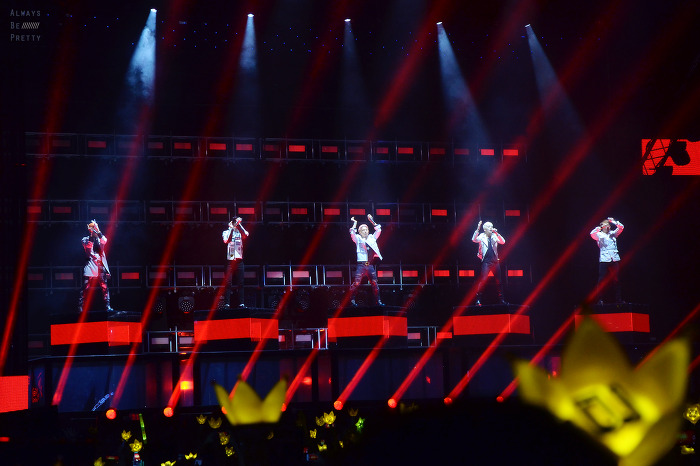
Bigbang Made Tour in Dalian, China, 27 June 2015.

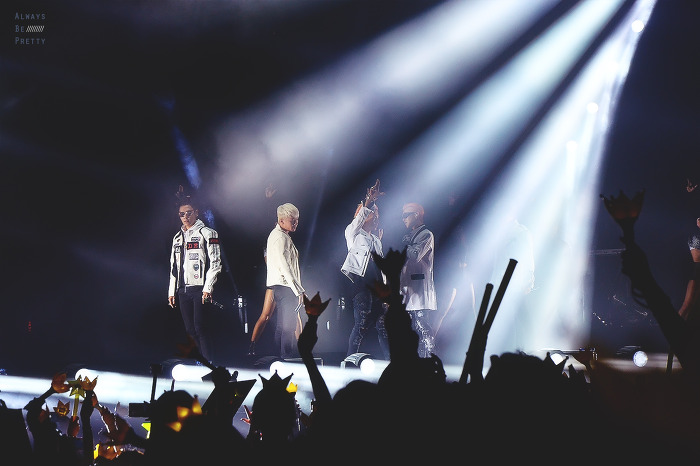
Bigbang Made Tour in Dalian, China, 27 June 2015.

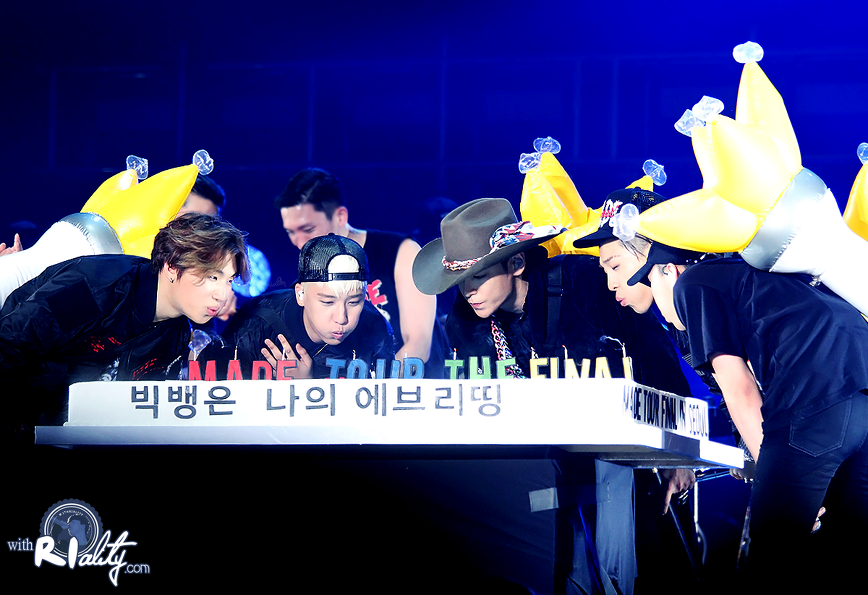
Bigbang Made Tour Final in Seoul.

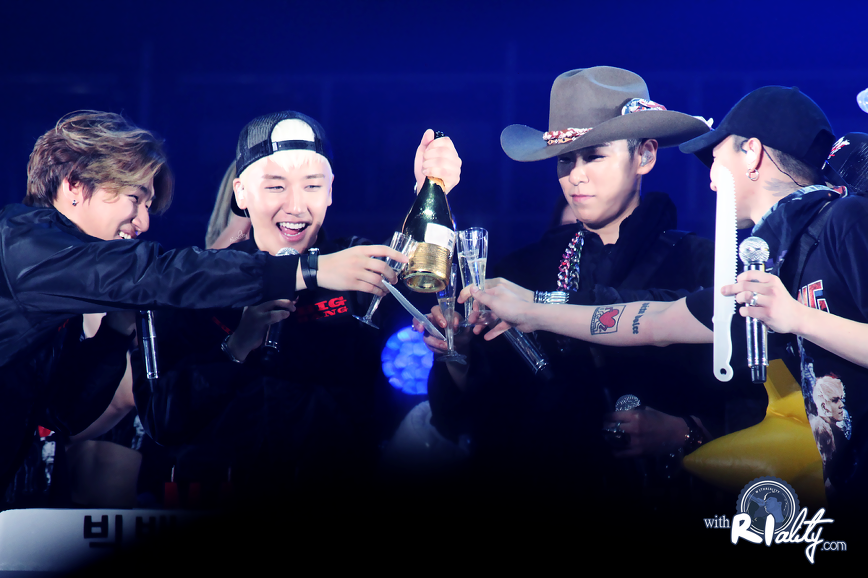
Bigbang Made Tour Final in Seoul.

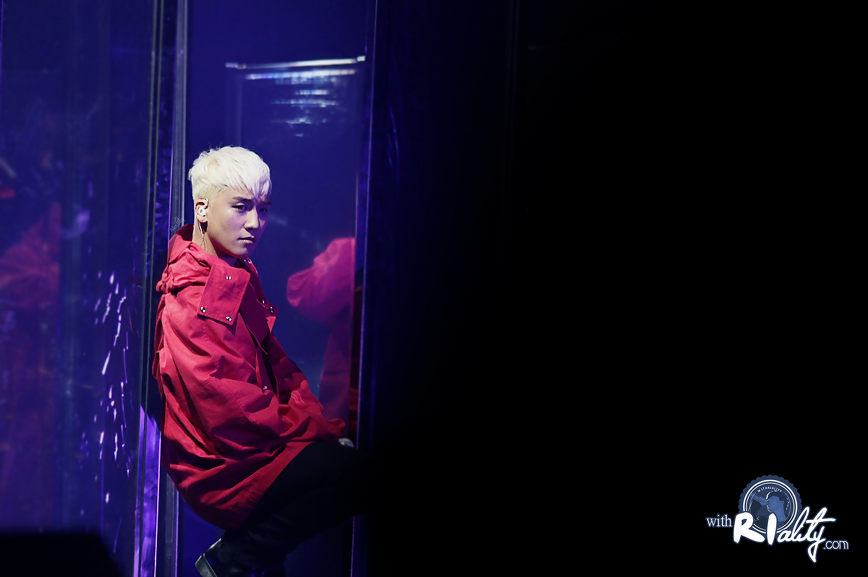
Seungri in Bigbang Made Tour Final in Seoul.
