= E (single album) =

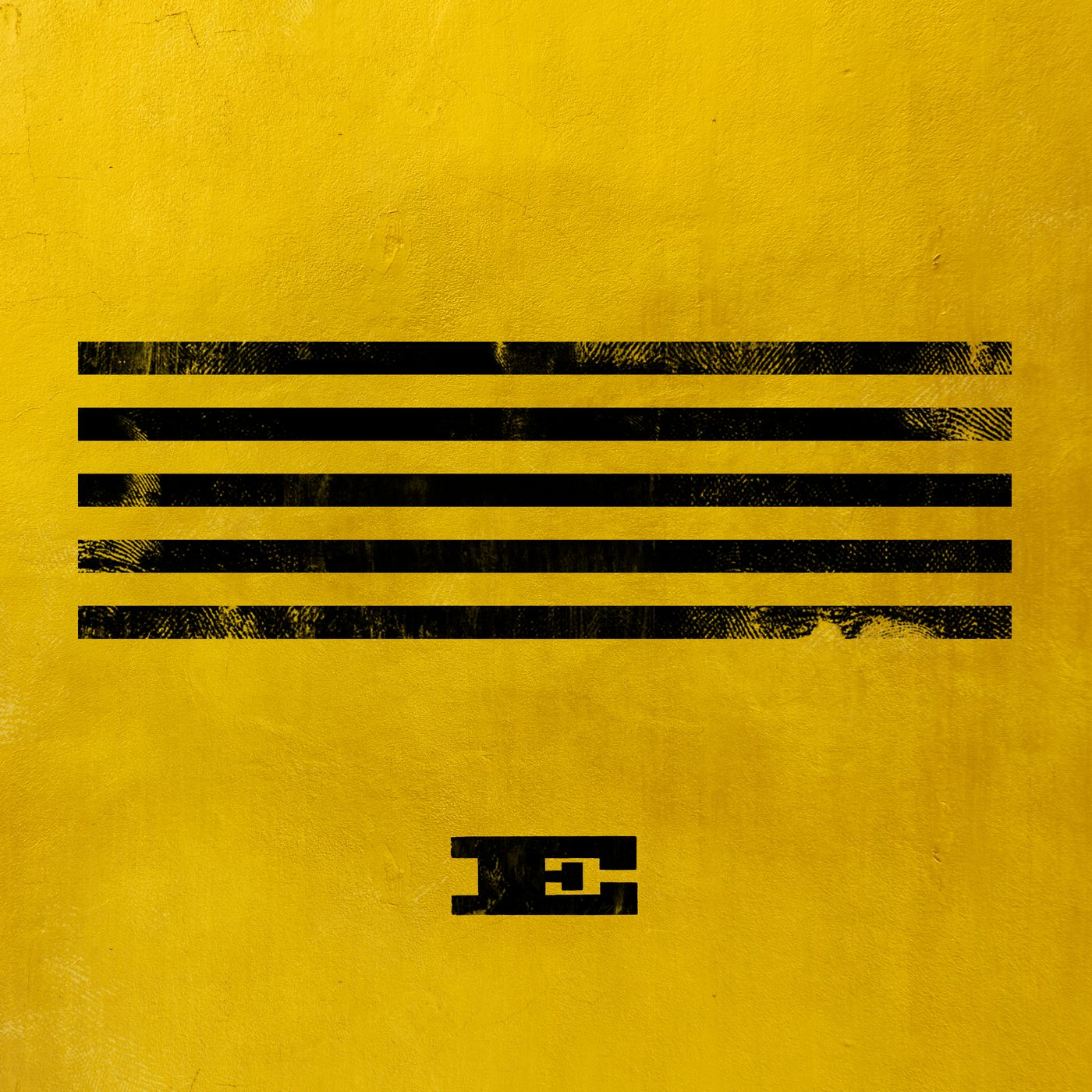

Single album by Big Bang
- Released: August 5, 2015
- Recorded: 2014–2015
- Genre: Hip-hop; electropop
- Length: 6:46 (Digital); 35:19 (Physical)
- Label: YG; KT Music
- Producer: Yang Hyun-suk (exec.); Teddy; G-Dragon

Big Bang chronology
| D (2015) | E (2015) | Made Series (2016) |

E is the seventh single album by South Korean band Big Bang, and the fourth and last from their Made Series, before releasing the full album.

== Background ==
The first single announced on July 24 included the sub-unit GD & TOP, the teaser was released the next day. This was the first collaboration of the duo in four years. YG Entertainment confirmed there would be a second track by the entire band; "Let’s Not Fall In Love" was revealed on July 30.

== Commercial performance ==
In South Korea The album charted at number one on Gaon Album Chart, making it the third from MADE Series to chart first after M and D, in the end of August the album sold 84,002 copies in South Korea. In Japan the album charted at number 15 on the Oricon chart with 4,090 copies sold.

After releasing the album, BigBang achieved a "triple kill" by topping the digital, streaming and album charts on Gaon Chart. The single charted first and second with "Let’s Not Fall In Love" and "Zutter" consecutively on Billboard World Digital Songs, in a tie with PSY for being the only K-pop act to hold the top two slots on World Digital Songs three times, after topping it with both M and A. The two singles sold 13,000 copies in less than two days.

== Reception ==
Billboard explained that "Let's Not Fall in Love showcases the boy band at their most sentimental", and is a classic BigBang song with a unique sound because of a "lack of a definitive chorus and T.O.P and G-Dragon showing off new vocal colors instead of their usual personality-driven raps", while Zutter is a "hip-hop cut peppered with trappy snares, knocking percussion and woozy synths to emphasize both dudes' distinctive spitting styles.". The Inquirer called it the most emotionally resounding work the band has showcased so far. Osen said that the two single have a "different moods and colors" and that something only BigBang can do and they have wide artistic spectrum.

== Promotion ==
It was announced that GD&TOP would have a live broadcast on Naver and allkpop's V app on August 4. The live countdown gathered over 620,000 views, and after five days the highlight video was watched over a million times on V app. The first television appearance was held on Inkigayo.

== Accolades ==
Awards and nominations for E
| Year | Ceremony | Award | Result | Ref. |
|---|---|---|---|---|
| 2016 | Gaon Chart Music Awards | Album of the Year (3rd Quarter) | Nominated | |
| 2016 | RTHK International Pop Poll Awards | The Best Selling Album | Won | |
| 2016 | Soompi Awards | Album of the Year | Won | |

== Track listing ==
E - Single
| No. | Title | Lyrics | Music | Arrangement | Length |
|---|---|---|---|---|---|
| 1. | "Zutter (GD&T.O.P)" (쩔어; Jjeoreo) | G-Dragon, Teddy, T.O.P | Teddy, G-Dragon, T.O.P | Teddy | 3:14 |
| 2. | "Let's Not Fall in Love" (우리 사랑하지 말아요; Uri Saranghaji Marayo) | Teddy, G-Dragon | Teddy, G-Dragon | Teddy | 3:32 |
| Total length: | | | | | 6:46 |

E - CD
| No. | Title | Lyrics | Music | Arrangement | Length |
|---|---|---|---|---|---|
| 1. | "Zutter (GD&T.O.P)" (쩔어; Jjeoreo) | G-Dragon, Teddy, T.O.P | Teddy, G-Dragon, T.O.P | Teddy | 3:14 |
| 2. | "Let's Not Fall in Love" (우리 사랑하지 말아요; Uri Saranghaji Marayo) | Teddy, G-Dragon | Teddy, G-Dragon | Teddy | 3:32 |
| 3. | "If You" | G-Dragon | G-Dragon, P.K, Dee.P | P.K, Dee.P | 4:24 |
| 4. | "Sober" (맨정신; Maenjeongsin) | Teddy, G-Dragon, T.O.P | Teddy, Choice37, G-Dragon | Teddy, Choice37 | 3:57 |
| 5. | "Bang Bang Bang" | Teddy, G-Dragon, T.O.P | Teddy, G-Dragon | Teddy | 3:49 |
| 6. | "Loser" | Teddy, T.O.P, G-Dragon | Teddy, Taeyang | Teddy | 3:39 |
| 7. | "Bae Bae" | G-Dragon, Teddy, T.O.P | Teddy, G-Dragon, T.O.P | Teddy | 2:49 |
| 8. | "We Like 2 Party" | Teddy, Kush, G-Dragon, T.O.P | Teddy, G-Dragon, T.O.P | Teddy, Kush | 3:16 |
| 9. | "Zutter" (instrumental) | | Teddy, G-Dragon, T.O.P | | 3:14 |
| 10. | "Let’s Not Fall in Love (우리 사랑하지 말아요)" (instrumental) | | Teddy, G-Dragon | | 3:32 |
| Total length: | | | | | 35:19 |

E (CD) – Special version of iTunes
| No. | Title | Length |
|---|---|---|
| 1. | "Zutter (GD&TOP)" (a cappella) | 3:14 |
| 2. | "Zutter (GD&TOP)" (MR) | 3:14 |
| 3. | "Zutter (GD&TOP)" (instrumental) | 3:14 |
| 4. | "Let's Not Fall in Love" (a cappella) | 3:31 |
| 5. | "Let's Not Fall in Love" (MR) | 3:31 |
| 6. | "Let's Not Fall in Love" (instrumental) | 3:31 |

== Charts ==
=== Weekly charts ===
| Chart (2015) | Peak position |
|---|---|
| Japanese Albums (Oricon) | 15 |
| Japanese Western Albums (Oricon) | 2 |
| South Korean Albums (Gaon) | 1 |
| Taiwanese Albums (G-Music) | 1 |

=== Year-end charts ===
| Chart (2015) | Position |
|---|---|
| South Korean Albums (Gaon) | 19 |
| Chart (2016) | Position |
| South Korean Albums (Gaon) | 99 |

=== Sales ===
| Chart | Sales |
|---|---|
| South Korea (Gaon) | 123,389 |
| Japan (Oricon) | 13,888 |

== Release history ==
| Region | Date | Format | Label |
|---|---|---|---|
| Worldwide | August 5, 2015 | Digital download | YG |
| South Korea | August 5, 2015 | Digital download | YG |
| South Korea | August 12, 2015 | CD | YG; KT Music |
| Japan | August 12, 2015 | Digital download | YGEX |
| Taiwan | August 19, 2015 | CD | Warner Music Taiwan |
