= 2015 Melon Music Awards =

2015 South Korean music award ceremony

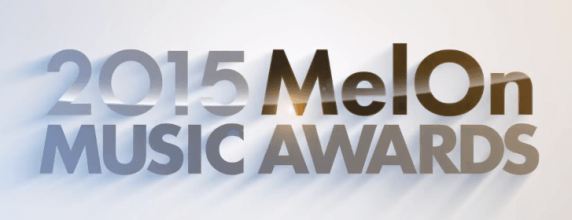
- Date: November 7, 2015
- Location: Olympic Gymnastics Arena, Seoul, South Korea

Highlights
- Most awards: Big Bang (4)
- Most nominations: Big Bang and Exo (5)
- Song of the Year: "Bang Bang Bang"
- Album of the Year: Exodus
- Artist of the Year: Big Bang
- Website: www.melon.com/mma/index.htm

Television/radio coverage
- Network: JTBC2; JTBC4; 1theK; KakaoTV; Daum; Melon
- Runtime: 240 minutes

The 2015 Melon Music Awards were held on Saturday, November 7, 2015, at the Olympic Gymnastics Arena in Seoul, South Korea. Organized by Kakao M through its online music store Melon, the 2015 ceremony was the seventh installment of the event. The ceremony was hosted by television personality Yoo Byung-jae. Exo and Big Bang led the number of nominations with five each, with BigBang winning four of those awards while Exo won two.

== Performers ==
List of performances at 2015 Melon Music Awards
Artist(s)	Song(s)
Monsta X	"Trespass" / "Hero"
GFriend	"Glass Bead" / "Me Gustas Tu"
iKon	"My Type" / "Rhythm Ta"
Hong Jin-young	"Cheer Up"
EXID	"Up & Down" / "Ah Yeah"
Red Velvet	"Dumb Dumb"
BTS	Intro + "I Need U"
Hyukoh	"Hooka" / "Because I Love You"
Apink	"Mollayo" / "No No No" / "Mr. Chu" / "Luv" / "Remember"
Big Bang	"If You" / "Loser" / "Bang Bang Bang" / "Sober" / "Fantastic Baby"

== Presenters ==
MCs

- Yoo Byung-jae
- Seo Kang-joon
- Lee Yu-bi
- Kim Shin-young
- Kim So-hyun
- Irene

== Winners and nominees ==
=== Main awards ===
Winners and nominees are listed below. Winners are listed first and emphasized in bold.

Top 10 Artists (Bonsang)	Album of the Year (Daesang)
**Big Bang**; **Girls' Generation**; **Shinee**; **Exo**; **Apink**; **San E**; **Sistar**; **Zion.T**; **You Hee-yeol**; **Hyukoh**	**Exo – Exodus**; Big Bang – M; Shinee – Odd; Toy – Da Capo; Hyukoh – 22
Artist of the Year (Daesang)	Song of the Year (Daesang)
**Big Bang**; Shinee; Exo; Zion.T; Hyukoh	**Big Bang – "Bang Bang Bang"**; Sistar – "Shake It"; Apink – "Luv"; Exo – "Call Me Baby"; Toy – "Three of Us"
Best New Male Artist	Best New Female Artist
**iKon**; Monsta X; Seventeen; Up10tion; N.Flying	**GFriend**; Lovelyz; Sonamoo; CLC; Oh My Girl
Best Dance Award (Male)	Best Dance Award (Female)
**BTS – "I Need U"**; Jonghyun – "Deja-Boo"; Block B Bastarz – "Zero For Conduct"; Jinusean – "Tell Me Once"; Park Jin-young – "Who's Your Mama?"	**Red Velvet – "Ice Cream Cake"**; Mamamoo – "Um Oh Ah Yea"; EXID – "Ah Yeah"; AOA – "Heart Attack"; Miss A – "Only You"
Best Rap/Hip Hop Award	Best Ballad Award
**Mad Clown ft. Jinsil – "Fire"**; MFBTY – "Angel"; Loco – "You Don't Know"; MC Mong – "Love Mash"; Dynamic Duo ft. Lena Park – "Ssss"	**Baek A-yeon ft. Young K – "Shouldn't Have..."**; Park Hyo-shin – "Happy Together"; Huh Gak – "Snow of April"; Davichi ft. Mad Clown – "Two Lovers"; Noel – "Your Voice"
Best Indie Award	Best Rock Award
**Standing Egg ft. Wheein – "The Sunlight Hurts"**; Vanilla Acoustic – "I can't last even a minute" (1분도 못버텨); The Black Skirts – "Hollywood"; Sugarbowl – "Focus on Me" (나한테 집중해); Zitten – "Let's get along, we" (잘 지내자, 우리)	**Kim Sung-kyu – "The Answer"**; CNBLUE – "Cinderella"; Buzz – "Tree"; Nell – "Green Nocturne"; Lee Moon-sae ft. Naul – "Spring Breeze"
Best Trot Award	Best OST Award
**Hong Jin-young – "Love Wi-Fi"**; Jang Yoon-jeong – "Adhesive Plaster" (반창고); Lizzy ft. Jung Hyung-don – "I'm Not an Easy Girl"; So Yu-mi – "Shake Me Up"; Hong Jeong-hee & Park Gu-yun – "I Love You and Thank You"	**Loco & Yuju – "Spring Is Gone By Chance(A Girl Who Sees Smells)"**; Jang Jae-in ft. Nashow – "Auditory Hallucination" (Kill Me, Heal Me); Park So-jin & Zico – "It Hurts" (Mask); Kim Bum-soo – "From the Beginning of a Love Confession" (The Producers); MC the Max – "Look" (바라보기) (Birth of a Beauty)
Netizen Popularity Award	Hot Trend Award
**Big Bang**; Exo; Infinite; Beast; Shinee; Girls' Generation; Apink; iKon	**Infinite Challenge**; Mino; Kim Yeon-woo; Jung Seung-hwan; Shin Ji-min ft. Iron
Best R&B / Soul	Best Pop
**Naul – "Living in the Same Time"**	**Mark Ronson – "Uptown Funk" (ft. Bruno Mars)**

=== Other awards ===
Nominees	Winners
MBC Music Star Award	EXID
1theK Performance Award	Monsta X
Songwriter Award	Teddy Park
