= Made (BigBang album) =

2016 album by South Korean band BigBang

- Digital cover

Studio album by Big Bang
- Released: December 13, 2016
- Studio: YG Studios (Seoul)
- Genres: Hip hop; dance-pop; R&B; K-pop; pop-rock
- Length: 40:53
- Languages: Korean; English
- Labels: YG; KT
- Producers: Teddy; G-Dragon

Big Bang chronology
Made Series (2016)	Made (2016)

Singles from Made
- 1. "Loser" / "Bae Bae" Released: May 1, 2015; 2. "Bang Bang Bang" / "We Like 2 Party" Released: June 1, 2015; 3. "If You" / "Sober" Released: July 1, 2015; 4. "Zutter" / "Let's Not Fall in Love" Released: August 5, 2015; 5. "Fxxk It" / "Last Dance" Released: December 13, 2016

Made (stylized in all caps) is the third Korean-language studio album by South Korean boy band BigBang. The album was preceded by four single albums, each featuring two singles: M, A, D, and E, which were released from May to August 2015. Following more than a year of delays, the complete studio album was released on December 13, 2016. It marks the group's comeback after a three-year hiatus and their first full length Korean album since Remember (2008). The production of Made was primarily handled by G-Dragon and long-time group collaborator Teddy Park. Musically, the album employs hip hop, EDM, pop rock, R&B styles with lyrics examining expressions of doubt, worry, sexuality, and societal issues.

Made was received well by music critics, with Billboard naming it one of the 30 best boy band albums since 1990. Commercially, the album was a success in South Korea and other parts of Asia, selling over 250,000 copies in the group's native country and was certified gold by the Recording Industry Association of Japan (RIAJ) for over 100,000 units in physical sales. The album charted at number one on the South Korean, and Japanese national albums charts.

Ten of the eleven tracks on Made were promoted as singles, all achieving commercial success in South Korea. Each single ranked within the top three positions on the Gaon Digital Chart and surpassed 1,000,000 digital downloads. Music videos were produced for each single, which were directed by Seo Hyun-seung and Han Sa-min. The album's singles won various accolades in both South Korea and abroad, with "Bang Bang Bang" and "Loser" winning Song of the Year at the MAMA Awards, Melon Music Awards and Golden Disc Awards in 2015.

== Background ==
BigBang released their second Korean language studio album, Remember, in November 2008. Two Korean extended plays were then released in 2011 and 2012 respectively. The members of the band focused on their solo careers, with each (except T.O.P.) releasing one solo project. The album was first announced in January 2014 by G-Dragon, but was postponed. On April 20, 2015, YG Entertainment announced BigBang's comeback after a hiatus of nearly three years following Still Alive (2012). Later, the trailer for BigBang's Made World Tour was unveiled. Before the official album release, the Made project was divided into four parts, each of which included two singles that were released under each letter of the word Made, as M, A, D, and E. The first four parts were released on the first day of every month from May to August 2015, apart from the final part named E, which was released on August 5, 2015. The single releases were met with success; the four releases topped the monthly Gaon Digital Chart, making BigBang the first act to have four consecutive monthly number-ones. Additionally, three of the songs were among the five best-performing singles of 2015. The last project was to release the full album in September. However, due to BigBang's world tour and busy schedules, the full album was delayed.

On October 18, 2016, the members started filming music videos for the final release of the album in Cheongju. The second music video was filmed on October 15 in Seoul. On November 22, YG announced that the release of the full album would take place on December 12, 2016. On December 6, the lead single was revealed as "Fxxk It(에라모르겠다)". The following two days, the second single was announced to be a slow R&B song named "Last Dance", and the track list of the album was released, confirming three new songs along with the eight singles that were released in 2015.

== Composition ==
=== Music and lyrics ===
Made comprises an eclectic mix of songs, with Billboard stating that the album is "testament to the versatility K-pop acts can show in the music and just how truly hard it is to call K-pop a 'genre.'" AllMusic wrote that, in this album, BigBang's "trademark mix of dance-pop and R&B was blended with contemporary tropical and trap influences." During the album's recording BigBang aimed to create an album that would allowed them "to do and show unexpected things." Commenting about the variety of music genres, G-Dragon explained that "there are performance songs, and then there are songs of various colors. There will always be an unexpected twist." And added "because the album styles were different, it was a bit of a free-for-all."

The record's lyrical content "introduced a more mature style" to the group, but "without losing the images they had enforced through previous releases." In an interview, Taeyang said that the group "focused mostly on the issues that our society is facing and how we look at society." He concluded that they "wanted to have an exchange and sympathize" about their struggles with the public. In "Loser", they describe the feelings of "doubt and unhappiness that accompany the everyday life of a self-proclaimed loser." "Zutter", performed solely by the rappers of the group, G-Dragon and T.O.P, was noted for instead of the duo being "in reverence of themselves", they "are aware they are participating in a time-worn hip-hop tradition of unreasoning self-assertion and the debauchery that follows success."

"Bae Bae" and "Fxxk It" were noted for their sexual "charms" and vulgarity, showcasing the group's ability to mix "heartfelt with tongue-in-cheek lyrics". In contrast, "Let's Not Fall in Love" presents "the pressures and worries of starting a new relationship and committing to a person, and the potential pain that accompanies the risk of opening up to someone", while "Last Dance" is a message to their fans and a reflection of the group's decade together.

=== Songs ===
Made opens with "Fxxk It", a mid-tempo electronic hip-hop track with tropical elements. "Last Dance" is a pop-rock ballad while "Girlfriend" is a "hip hop throwback to the group's earlier efforts." "Let's Not Fall in Love" is a pop-rock tune with a classic dance sound, including acoustic melodies and hazy synths. "Loser" is a R&B track with the group's "brand of emotional hip-hop" while the following "Bae Bae" was observed for "taking the popular trap genre and turning it K-pop with flecks of electronica and bizarre samples."

"Bang Bang Bang" presents an "explosive modern EDM buzz" with a trap breakdown in the chorus, being called a "party anthem". "Sober" showcased a "more rock-driven sound", a genre rarely heard from the group. The track includes "lush guitars mixed with a pounding percussion" with a "spunky delivery and [a] high-energy rock sound." The following "If You" is a ballad centered "around sparse guitar strums, impassioned belts and haunting croons throughout the chorus." "Zutter" is hip-hop song with a trap-driven beat. The album ends with "We Like 2 Party", a "midtempo number with production that hits the midpoint between Steve Miller Band, One Direction, and Biz Markie", with a "breezy" and relaxing melody.

== Critical reception ==
Professional ratings
Review scores
Source	Rating
GIGsoup	84%
Idology	(positive)
IZM	3/5 stars
The Star	8/10
The Straits Times	4/5 stars

Made was well received by music critics. Writing for Fuse, Jeff Benjamin described the album as "career-exemplifying," noting how it solidifies the group's artistry and personality. Billboard chose Made as the sixth best K-pop album of 2016—praising the diversity of genres within the album and said "its value as a standalone piece of work is undeniable" and hailing BigBang as "one of the most universally loved acts on the scene." Gwendolyn Ng from The Straits Times noted that the album "comprises an eclectic mix of songs", including the "breezy We Like 2 Party, perfect for a relaxing road trip with friends", the "emotional pop tune Loser", and the "pulsating anthem Bang Bang Bang".

Likewise, Chester Chin from The Star called the album "cohesive and strong" and claimed that Made would "remind the K-pop audience on the fantastic musical geniuses who will elude them for the next few years." The album was chosen as the best Korean album released in December by the music streaming service KKBOX, who called the record a "strong return" and highlighted how "Last Dance" makes the listeners fascinated.

In 2019, Genius ranked it number 75 in their list of the 100 Best Albums of the 2010s, writing that the "signature mash-up sound" that was ushered through the record "has become a staple of the genre's artists of today." "Arriving after a two-year hiatus, Made didn't just show off the band's technical prowess and lyrical maturity–it also solidified Big Bang as international superstars." Billboard named it the 17th Best Boy Band Album of the Past 30 years in 2020, referring to the record as the group's magnum opus as well as "one of the most impactful albums ever created by a boy band, South Korean or otherwise."

=== Accolades ===
Award and nominations for Made
Organization	Year	Category	Result	Ref.
Gaon Chart Music Awards	2017	Album of the Year (4th Quarter)	Nominated	
Japan Gold Disc Awards	2018	Best 3 Albums – Asia	Won	
Melon Music Awards	2017	Album of the Year	Nominated	
RTHK International Pop Poll Awards	2017	Best Selling Album	Won	
Soompi Awards	2017	Album of the Year	Nominated	

Made on critic rankings
Publication	List	Rank	Ref.
Billboard	10 Best K-Pop Albums of 2016: Critic’s Picks	6	
Billboard	30 Best Boy Band Albums of the Past 30 Years	17	
Genius	Genius's 100 Best Albums of the 2010s	75	
Paste	The 30 Greatest K-pop Albums of All Time	12	

== Commercial performance ==
Made was available for pre-order in December 8, in China on QQ Music, and in the first day the album reached 170,000 pre-ordered copies. Made surpassed 900,000 digital sales in less than a day after its official release in the site, and with QQ Music, Kugou, and Kuwo, which are considered as China's three major music platforms the album sold total 1,113,494 digital copies in the first day. In less than two days the album surpassed 1,000,000 in QQ Music. As of March 2017, the album has sold over 2.8 million copies in China's three major music platforms, making it one of the best-selling digital albums in Chinese history.

In the United States, the album debuted at No. 172 on the Billboard 200 with 6,000 equivalent album units, 4,000 of which were in traditional album sales, earning the band their second entry on the chart. They also debuted at number one on the World Albums and the Heatseekers Albums charts. In South Korea, the limited edition of the album was released on December 23, 2016, and debuted at number two in the Gaon Album Chart, with 100,000 copies sold. On January 5, 2017, the regular edition was released, topping the Gaon weekly album chart, and the Gaon monthly album chart, with additional 142,652 copies sold in January. Made was the sixth best-selling album for the first half of 2017 in South Korea.

In Japan, the Korean edition charted at number 23 on the Oricon Albums Chart, selling 2,538 copies. On February 15, the album was released officially in Japan, topping the Oricon daily album chart. According to Soundscan Japan the album sold 76,668 in the first day. Made sold 101,364 copies in its first week, earning the group their fourth number one album in the Oricon Albums Chart. Additionally, it was the best-selling album by a Korean artist in the first half of 2017 in Japan.

=== Streaming ===
All eight singles released in 2015 were selected as the biggest K-Pop songs of the Summer of that year by Billboard, with "Bang Bang Bang", "If You", and "Sober" took the first three places consecutively. Additionally, the most viewed K-Pop music videos of that season were "Bang Bang Bang", while "Sober", "We Like 2 Party", "Let's Not Fall in Love" and "Zutter" took the sixth, seventh, eighth and tenth spots consecutively.

In the Taiwanese music streaming service KKBox, all of the eight singles ranked in the top 20 of the best performing Korean singles of 2015, while Made ranked eighth on Top 10 Korean Albums of 2016 list with only three weeks worth of streams. As of June 25, 2020, the nine Made music videos have accumulated over 1.528 billion views on YouTube, and as of July 2, 2017, over 210 million views and over a billion audio streams in the Chinese video sharing websites such as Youku and QQ Music. On Spotify the album has surpassed 200 million streams.

== Promotion ==
In April 2015, BigBang commenced their second worldwide concert tour in Seoul, titled the Made World Tour, which ran until March 2016. The tour saw shows in 15 different countries across Asia, North America, and Australia, and attracted 1.5 million attendees. On December 12, 2016, the group hosted a live-broadcasting on Naver V-App one hour before the release of Made, to celebrate the release of the first full-album in eight years with fans, which garnered more than 1.5 million viewers. The members also appeared on two episodes of the talk show Radio Star, on Infinite Challenge and, lastly, on Weekly Idol to promote the album. They performed on SBS's end-of-year TV festival 2016 SBS Gayo Daejeon.

== Track listing ==
Made: The Full Album – Standard edition
No.	Title	Lyrics	Music	Arrangement	Length
1.	"Fxxk It" (에라 모르겠다; Era Moreugedda)	Teddy; G-Dragon; T.O.P	Teddy; G-Dragon; R.Tee	Teddy; R.Tee	3:52
2.	"Last Dance"	G-Dragon; T.O.P; Taeyang	G-Dragon; Jeon Yong Jun	Seo Won Jin; 24	4:40
3.	"Girlfriend"	Teddy; G-Dragon; T.O.P	Teddy; G-Dragon; Choice37	Teddy; Choice37	3:49
4.	"Let's Not Fall in Love" (우리 사랑하지 말아요; Uri Saranghaji Marayo)	Teddy; G-Dragon	Teddy; G-Dragon	Teddy	3:32
5.	"Loser"	Teddy; T.O.P; G-Dragon	Teddy; Taeyang	Teddy	3:39
6.	"Bae Bae"	G-Dragon; Teddy; T.O.P	Teddy; G-Dragon; T.O.P	Teddy	2:49
7.	"Bang Bang Bang" (뱅뱅뱅; Baeng Baeng Baeng)	Teddy; G-Dragon; T.O.P	Teddy; G-Dragon	Teddy	3:40
8.	"Sober" (맨정신; Maenjeongsin)	Teddy; G-Dragon; T.O.P	Teddy; Choice37; G-Dragon	Teddy; Choice37	3:57
9.	"If You"	G-Dragon	G-Dragon; P.K; Dee.P	P.K; Dee.P	4:24
10.	"Zutter" (GD & TOP; 쩔어; Jjeoreo; lit. 'Dope')	G-Dragon; Teddy; T.O.P	Teddy; G-Dragon; T.O.P	Teddy	3:14
11.	"We Like 2 Party"	Teddy; Kush; G-Dragon; T.O.P	Teddy; Kush; Seo Won Jin; G-Dragon	Teddy; Kush	3:16
Total length:					40:53

Made: The Full Album – Japanese edition
No.	Title	Lyrics	Music	Arrangement	Length
1.	"Loser" (Japanese version)	Teddy; G-Dragon; T.O.P; Sunny Boy	Teddy; Taeyang	Teddy	3:41
2.	"Bang Bang Bang" (Japanese version)	Teddy; G-Dragon; T.O.P; Verbal	Teddy; G-Dragon	Teddy	3:42
3.	"If You" (Japanese version)	G-Dragon; Shoko Fujibayashi	G-Dragon; P.K; Dee.P	P.K; Dee.P	4:27
4.	"Fxxk It" (Korean version)	Teddy; G-Dragon; T.O.P	Teddy; G-Dragon; R.Tee	Teddy; R.Tee	3:53
5.	"Last Dance" (Korean version)	G-Dragon; T.O.P; Taeyang	G-Dragon; Jeon Yong Jun	Seo Won Jin; 24	4:41
6.	"Girlfriend" (Korean version)	Teddy; G-Dragon; T.O.P	Teddy; G-Dragon; Choice37	Teddy; Choice37	3:51
7.	"Let's Not Fall in Love" (Korean version)	Teddy; G-Dragon	Teddy; G-Dragon	Teddy	3:34
8.	"Loser" (Korean version)	Teddy; G-Dragon; T.O.P	Teddy; Taeyang	Teddy	3:40
9.	"Bae Bae" (Korean version)	Teddy; G-Dragon; T.O.P	Teddy; G-Dragon; T.O.P	Teddy	2:50
10.	"Bang Bang Bang" (Korean version)	Teddy; G-Dragon; T.O.P	Teddy; G-Dragon	Teddy	3:41
11.	"Sober" (Korean version)	Teddy; G-Dragon; T.O.P	Teddy; Choice37; G-Dragon	Teddy; Choice37	3:58
12.	"If You" (Korean version)	G-Dragon	G-Dragon; P.K; Dee.P	P.K; Dee.P	4:25
13.	"Zutter (GD & T.O.P)" (Korean version)	Teddy; G-Dragon; T.O.P	Teddy; G-Dragon; T.O.P	Teddy	3:16
14.	"We Like 2 Party" (Korean version)	Teddy; Kush; G-Dragon; T.O.P	Teddy; Kush; Seo Won-jin; G-Dragon	Teddy; Kush	3:18
Total length:					53:02

== Chart performance ==
=== Weekly charts ===
Weekly chart performance for Made
Chart (2016–2017)	Peak position
French Download Albums (SNEP)	39
Japanese Albums (Oricon)	1
Japanese Hot Albums (Billboard)	1
South Korean Albums (Gaon)	1
UK Download Albums (OCC)	67
US Billboard 200	172
US Independent Albums (Billboard)	12
US World Albums (Billboard)	1

=== Year-end charts ===
2016 year-end chart performance for Made
Chart (2016)	Position
South Korean Albums (Gaon)	24

2017 year-end chart performance for Made
Chart (2017)	Position
Japanese Albums (Oricon)	32
Japan Top Albums Sales (Billboard)	33
South Korean Albums (Gaon)	20
US World Albums (Billboard)	6

== Sales and certifications ==
Certifications for Made
Region	Certification	Certified units/sales
Japan (RIAJ)	Gold	137,821
South Korea	—	276,392
United States	—	4,000

== Release history ==
Release history and formats for Made
Region	Date	Format	Label	Ref.
Various	December 13, 2016	Digital download; streaming	YG	
South Korea	December 23, 2016 (First press limited edition)	CD	YG; KT Music	
South Korea	January 5, 2017 (Standard edition)	CD	YG; KT Music	
Taiwan	January 6, 2017	CD	Warner Music Taiwan	
Japan	February 15, 2017	CD; CD + DVD	YGEX	
Japan	February 15, 2017	CD + Blu-ray; playbutton	YGEX	
