= Girlfriend (BigBang song) =

2016 song performed by Big Bang

Song by BigBang

from the album Made
- Genre: Hip hop
- Length: 3:49
- Label: YG Entertainment
- Songwriters: Teddy; G-Dragon; T.O.P
- Producers: Teddy; G-Dragon; Choice37

"Girlfriend" is a song recorded by South Korean group BigBang.

== Background ==
On December 8, 2016, the name of the song was revealed as the last part of the album Made, along with the song's writers and producers names. It is one of the first songs that made it to the Made album and was supposed to be a part of the singles in 2015, but it was instead released as a part of the full album on December 13, 2016, at midnight KST worldwide.

== Composition and lyrics ==
"Girlfriend" was written by YG producer Teddy with BigBang members G-Dragon and T.O.P. Production was done by Teddy, G-Dragon and Choice37, and arrangement was done by Teddy and Choice37. The song was described as a "mellow hip-hop throwback to the group’s early days."

== Chart performance ==
Upon its release, the song charted third four charts in China QQ Music including the daily, popularity index, music video, and K-pop music video charts, only behind the band's songs "Fxxk It" and "Last Dance". In South Korea, "Girlfriend" placed third in Digital and Download charts behind the band other single Fxxk It and Last Dance, selling 237,290 digital copies in five days. In Gaon Streaming Chart with over 4.5 million streams, it charted in the fifth place. By March 2017, "Girlfriend" sold 548,948 digital units in South Korea.

== Charts ==
Weekly chart performance for "Girlfriend"
Chart (2016)	Peak position
Japan Hot 100 Singles (Billboard Japan)	22
South Korea (Gaon)	3
US World Digital Songs (Billboard)	4
