= D (single album) =

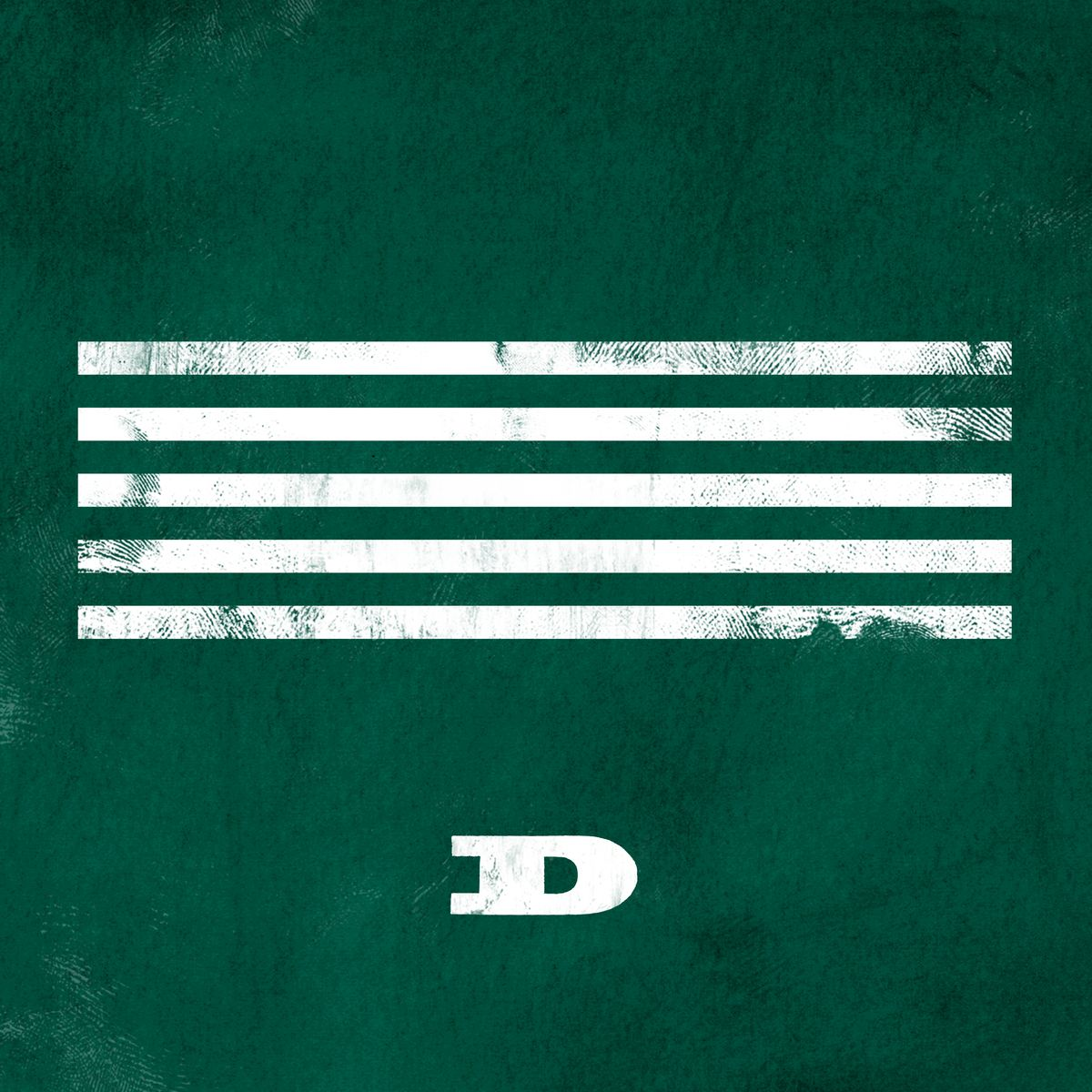

Single album by Big Bang
- Released: July 1, 2015
- Recorded: 2013–2015
- Genres: Electronic rock; punk; pop
- Length: 8:21 (Digital); 28:15 (Physical)
- Labels: YG; KT Music
- Producers: Yang Hyun-suk (exec.); Teddy; G-Dragon

Big Bang chronology
A (2015)	D (2015)	E (2015)

D is the sixth single album by South Korean band Big Bang, and the third from their Made Series.

== Background ==
The first poster of D was released on June 26, with the name of the title track, and the date of album release. The second poster with the second title track was released on the next day June 27. The two new songs were released on July 1, and the physical album will be released on the 7th. The release is supported by a live countdown on Naver Starcast on 30 June, 11 pm.

== Commercial performance ==
In less than 20 hours D sold over 500,000 copies in China. In only three days the album sold over 650,000 in China, making a record of the fastest selling album in China. After only 9 days the album sold over 800,000 copies and become the best selling album for Bigbang in China. Both singles sold over half million copies in the first week in South Korea. On August 1, 2016 the album reached 1 million digital sales in China. As of March 2017, the album has sold over 1.3 million copies on QQ Music, making it one of the best-selling digital albums in Chinese history.

It charted at number one on the Gaon Album Chart on July 16, the album sold on July 89,017 copies. In Japan the album debuted at number 16, with total 4,917 copies sold.

On YouTube, the video included on billboard's Most Viewed K-Pop Videos in America & Around the World in June, peaking No.9 on both America and World, with only counting less than 24 hours views.

== Reception ==
Before the releasing of the singles Tablo from Epik High called "If You" breathtaking, while "Sober" a song that "kicks asses". Yang Hyun-suk named "If You" the saddest song that BIGBANG has ever made.

Billboard talked about "If You", saying that it was the "band's most instantly striking pieces in years." Osen talked about the mix between fun and sadness in the album, and how only BigBang can make it work, "Utmost tenderness and fun and exciting feelings are all mixed together in the song. Following the BIGBANG style but new, it was the pinnacle of BIGBANG style.", they called "If You" "is the saddest song ever in BIGBANG's history" and "Sober", "a song that everyone can enjoy cheerfully."

G-Dragon received good reviews for his writing, "G-Dragon shows of his formidible [sic] songwriting chops, evoking the complexity of "Lies" or "Haru Haru"." Also calling D one of the best releases from MADE Series.

== Promotion ==
The first live performance was during their Made Tour in Bangkok, Thailand on July 11, 2015.

== Track listing ==
D - Single
No.	Title	Lyrics	Music	Arrangement	Length
1.	"If You"	G-Dragon	G-Dragon, P.K, Dee.P	P.K, Dee.P	4:24
2.	"Sober" (맨정신; Maenjeongsin)	Teddy, G-Dragon, T.O.P	Teddy, Choice37, G-Dragon	Teddy, Choice37	3:57
Total length:					8:21

D - CD
No.	Title	Lyrics	Music	Arrangement	Length
1.	"If You"	G-Dragon	G-Dragon, P.K, Dee.P	P.K, Dee.P	4:24
2.	"Sober" (맨정신; Maenjeongsin)	Teddy, G-Dragon, T.O.P	Teddy, Choice37, G-Dragon	Teddy, Choice37	3:57
3.	"Bang Bang Bang"	Teddy, G-Dragon, T.O.P	Teddy, G-Dragon	Teddy	3:49
4.	"Loser"	Teddy, T.O.P, G-Dragon	Teddy, Taeyang	Teddy	3:39
5.	"Bae Bae"	G-Dragon, Teddy, T.O.P	Teddy, G-Dragon, T.O.P	Teddy	2:49
6.	"We Like 2 Party"	Teddy, Kush, G-Dragon, T.O.P	Teddy, G-Dragon, T.O.P	Teddy, Kush	3:16
7.	"Sober" (instrumental)		Teddy, Choice37, G-Dragon		3:57
8.	"If You" (instrumental)		G-Dragon, P.K, Dee.P		4:24
Total length:					28:15

Japan Edition – Digital
No.	Title	Length
1.	"If You" (Korean version)	4:24
2.	"Sober" (Korean version)	3:57
3.	"If You" (instrumental)	4:24
4.	"Sober" (instrumental)	3:57
Total length:		16:43

D (CD) – Special version of iTunes
No.	Title	Length
1.	"If You" (a cappella)	4:24
2.	"If You" (MR)	4:24
3.	"If You" (instrumental)	4:24
4.	"Sober" (a cappella)	3:57
5.	"Sober" (MR)	3:57
6.	"Sober" (instrumental)	3:57

== Charts ==
=== Weekly charts ===
Chart (2015)	Peak position
Japanese Albums (Oricon)	16
Japanese Western Albums (Oricon)	1
South Korean Albums (Gaon)	1
Taiwan East Asia Albums (G-Music)	1

=== Monthly charts ===
Chart (July 2015)	Peak position
South Korean Albums (Gaon)	4

=== Year-end charts ===
Chart (2015)	Position
South Korean Albums (Gaon)	26

== Sales ==
Chart	Sales
South Korea (Gaon)	91,201
Japan (Oricon)	8,853

== Release history ==
Region	Date	Format	Label
Worldwide	July 1, 2015	Digital download	YG
South Korea	July 1, 2015	Digital download	YG
South Korea	July 7, 2015	CD	YG; KT Music
Japan	July 8, 2015	Digital download	YGEX
Taiwan	July 14, 2015	CD	Warner Music Taiwan
