= A (single album) =

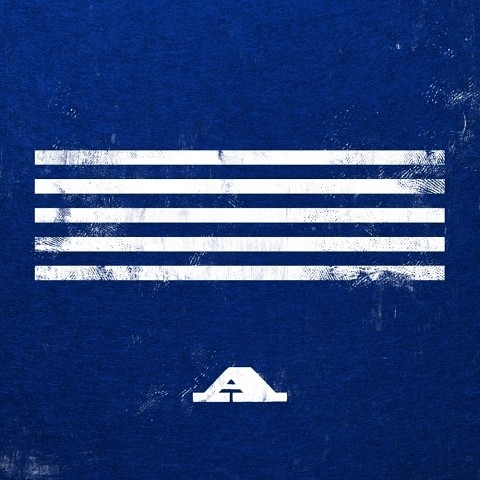

Single album by BigBang
- Released: June 1, 2015
- Recorded: 2014–2015
- Genres: Dance-pop; trap; acoustic
- Length: 6:55 (Digital); 20:38 (Physical)
- Labels: YG; KT Music
- Producers: G-Dragon; Teddy; Yang Hyun-suk (exec.)

BigBang chronology
M (2015)	A (2015)	D (2015)

Alternative cover
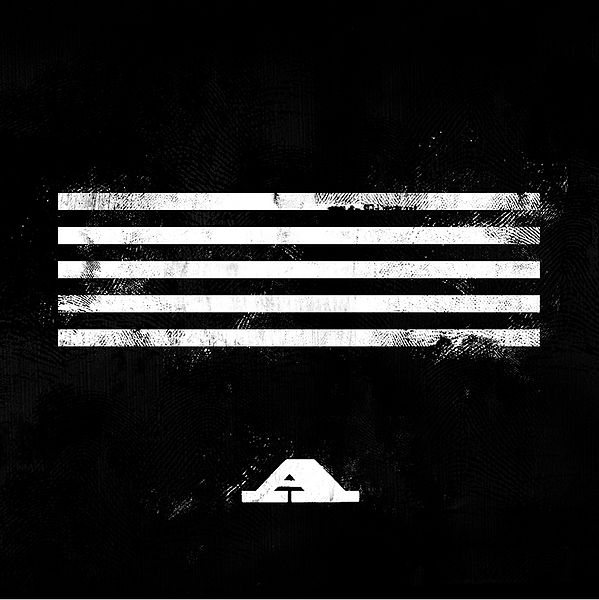
- "A" Version (Black)

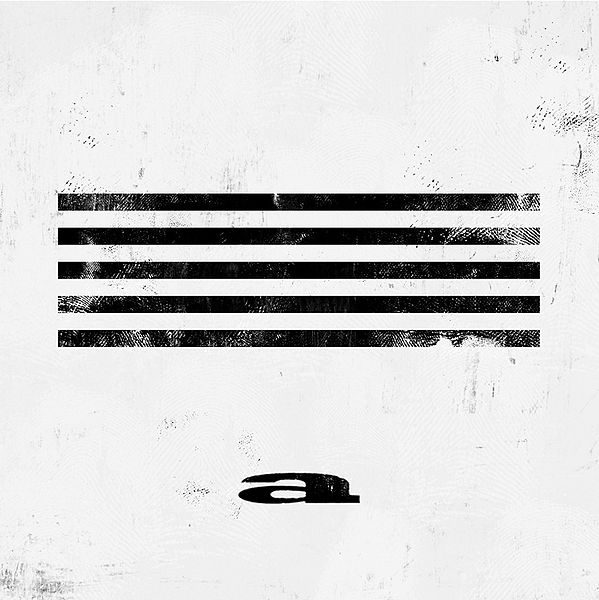
- "a" Version (White)

Singles from A
- 1. "Bang Bang Bang" / "We Like 2 Party" Released: June 1, 2015

A is the fifth single album by South Korean band BigBang, and the second from their Made Series. It was released on, June 1, 2015, by YG Entertainment. It consists of two tracks, "Bang Bang Bang" and "We Like 2 Party", both serving as singles from the band's third Korean-language studio album Made.

== Background and release ==
The first poster titled "Bang Bang Bang" was released on May 27, YG Entertainment producer Yang Hyun-suk commented that the song was "the most powerful music you have ever heard before." The second poster was released for "We Like 2 Party" a day later. The music video was shot on Jeju Island on May 19.

The single could be pre-ordered from May 27 to June 1, consisting of 4 tracks (two new songs and two previous ones) and two instrumental tracks. It was released worldwide through iTunes, and other online music portals on June 1. There are two different versions of the album, one contains only a CD and a booklet (24p) while the other one contains a CD, a booklet (24p) and a special kit (a random puzzle ticket, 5 photo cards and a limited photo card) with a poster.

== Commercial performance ==
A entered the Gaon Album Chart at number three, and peaked at number two the third week of release. The album peaked at number three on the monthly chart in June, selling 93,504 copies. In Taiwan, it charted at number 6.

According to QQ Music, the pre-orders for the album in China reached 1 million, in the first 12 hours the single sold 200,000 copies. After two weeks the album sold over 400,000 digital copies, breaking the record for foreign album sold on QQ Music, they also dominated the chart by having four songs on the top 6. As of March 2017, the album has sold over 800,000 copies on QQ Music, making it one of the best-selling digital albums in Chinese history.

== Reception ==
The singles received positive reviews from the fans, public and critics. In less than two months, the music videos gained over 60 million views on YouTube.

== Promotion ==
After previewing both songs during their Made Tour in Guangzhou, China, BigBang participated in Yoo Hee-yeol's Sketchbook on May 30, 2015. The members held a live podcast for the album, an hour before its release via Naver Starcast online, the live chat gathered more than 400,000 viewers. BigBang had their first official comeback on June 4 installment of Mnet's M Countdown.

On June 1, "Bang Bang Bang" was delayed on being registered in the voting system for 41 hours on SBS's Inkigayo, which led to SHINee's "View" winning, despite "Bang Bang Bang" being on the top of the charts, which led to a storm of complaints from the fans.

The problem with SBS continued, On June 14, it was announced that BigBang is banned from appearing on Inkigayo, according to SBS the reason was that G-Dragon and T.O.P didn't appear on the show when BigBang won the first place on May 24, only three members were able to show. YG representative said the members didn't show up due to the shooting of a music video. The winners of the show on June 14 was not announced on the same day, the results came the next day, the winner was BigBang.

BigBang stopped promoting the single afterwards and also didn't promote the next single album D.

== Track listing ==
A track listing
No.	Title	Lyrics	Music	Arrangement	Length
1.	"Bang Bang Bang"	Teddy, G-Dragon, T.O.P	Teddy, G-Dragon	Teddy	3:40
2.	"We Like 2 Party"	Teddy, Kush, G-Dragon, T.O.P	Teddy, Kush, Seo Won Jin, G-Dragon	Teddy, Kush	3:16
Total length:					6:55

A – CD bonus tracks
No.	Title	Lyrics	Music	Arrangement	Length
3.	"Loser"	Teddy, T.O.P, G-Dragon	Teddy, Taeyang	Teddy	3:39
4.	"Bae Bae"	G-Dragon, Teddy, T.O.P	Teddy, G-Dragon, T.O.P	Teddy	2:49
5.	"Bang Bang Bang" (instrumental)		Teddy, Taeyang		3:40
6.	"We Like 2 Party" (instrumental)		Teddy, Kush, Seo Won Jin, G-Dragon		3:16
Total length:					20:38

Japan Edition – Digital
No.	Title	Length
1.	"Bang Bang Bang" (Korean version)	3:40
2.	"We Like 2 Party" (Korean version)	3:15
3.	"Bang Bang Bang" (instrumental)	3:40
4.	"We Like 2 Party" (instrumental)	3:15
Total length:		13:51

A (CD) – Special version of iTunes
No.	Title	Length
1.	"Bang Bang Bang" (a cappella)	3:40
2.	"Bang Bang Bang" (MR)	3:40
3.	"Bang Bang Bang" (instrumental)	3:40
4.	"We Like 2 Party" (a cappella)	3:15
5.	"We Like 2 Party" (MR)	3:15
6.	"We Like 2 Party" (instrumental)	3:15
Total length:		20:45

== Charts ==
=== Weekly charts ===
Chart (2015)	Peak position
South Korean Albums (Gaon)	2
Taiwanese Albums (G-Music)	6

=== Year-end charts ===
Chart (2015)	Position
South Korean Albums (Gaon)	22

=== Sales ===
Chart	Sales
South Korea (Gaon)	102,493

== Release history ==
Region	Date	Format	Label
Worldwide	June 1, 2015	Digital download	YG
South Korea	June 1, 2015	Digital download	YG
South Korea	June 2, 2015	CD	YG; KT Music
Taiwan	June 9, 2015	CD	Warner Music Taiwan
Japan	June 17, 2015	Digital download	YGEX
