= M (single album) =

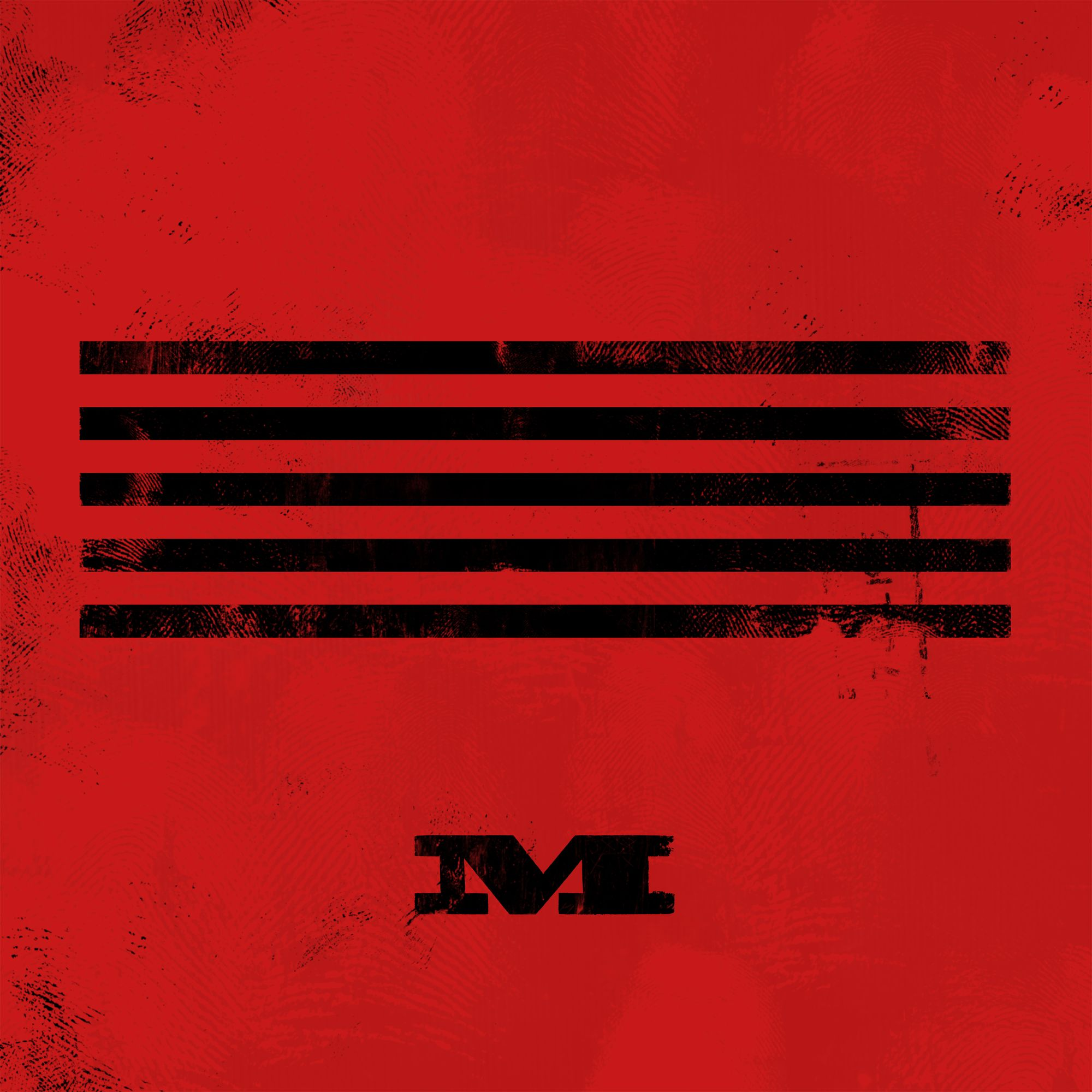

Single album by BigBang
- Released: May 1, 2015
- Recorded: 2014–2015
- Genres: Dance-pop; PBR&B; hip hop
- Length: 6:28 (Digital); 12:56 (Physical)
- Labels: YG; KT Music
- Producers: Yang Hyun-suk (exec.); Teddy; G-Dragon

BigBang chronology
The Best of Big Bang 2006–2014 (2014)	M (2015)	A (2015)

Alternative cover
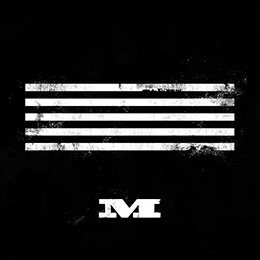
- "M" Version (Black)

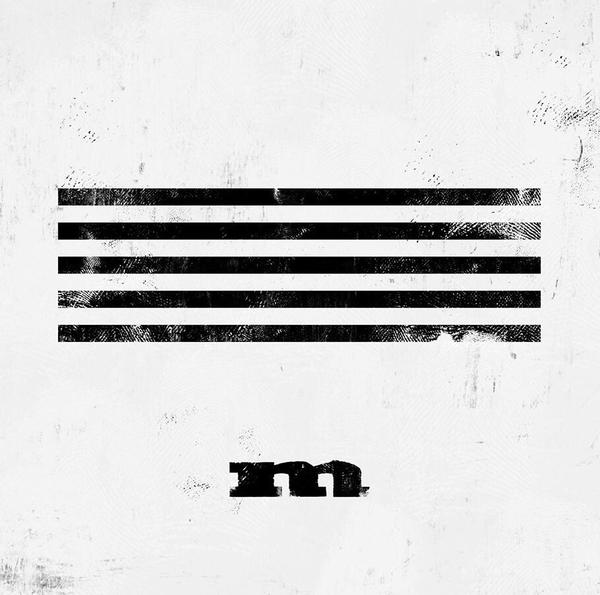
- "m" Version (White)

Singles from M
- 1. "Loser" / "Bae Bae" Released: May 1, 2015

M is the fourth single album by South Korean band BigBang, and the first from their Made Series. It was released on May 1, 2015, by YG Entertainment. The single album consists of two tracks, "Loser" and "Bae Bae", both serving as lead singles from the group's third Korean-language studio album Made. It marks the group's first comeback after a three-year absence, as well as their first single album in nine years.

== Background and release ==
On April 17, YG Entertainment revealed the first teaser picture. Later, trailer for BigBang's Made World Tour was unveiled. YG Entertainment announced the title tracks of BigBang's "MADE Series: M" in the third teaser. Two of the four teasers for D-1 to D-4 consist of the song info, including who was responsible for the tracks' composition. G-Dragon revealed during the second concert of Made World Tour that he had a hard time making the album, since there are a big expectations for BigBang's comeback, he said, "In all honesty, I was in a slump that wasn't a normal slump. I worried a lot. The group has grown due to all the fans, so I unknowingly felt a heavy burden because it's been a long time since we released an album. I worried a lot because of this, but we worked well, as we continued." He added, "I thought to myself that I just need to work. We got together frequently and worked."

The album opened for pre-order on 24 to 30 April consisting of two singles which are both title tracks and is released worldwide through iTunes, Melon and other online music portals on May 1. There are two different versions of the album; M (black) and m (white). One contains only CD and Booklet (24p) while the other one contains CD, Booklet (24p) + Special kit (Puzzle ticket, 5 photo cards and 1 limited photo card) + Poster.

== Commercial performance ==
M charted at number one on the Gaon Album Chart selling 130,130 copies in just two days, peaking at number two in April. The album sold 137,261 copies in the first half of 2015. The group debuted on Billboard's 'World Digital Songs' chart with "Loser" charting 1st place and "Bae Bae" charting 2nd place on May 7. The music videos were also ranked 3rd and 4th most viewed K-pop M/V videos in the U.S. (April) according to Billboard.

== Promotion ==
After performing both songs during their Made Tour, BigBang held their first comeback stage on Inkigayo on May 3, 2015. On May 6, YG Entertainment announced the release of special clips for "Bae Bae" on 6 to 10 May. BigBang had their second comeback on May 7 installment of MNET's M Countdown. On the May 10 episode on Inkigayo, BigBang made their third comeback. BigBang also appeared on KBS' "Happy Together" on May 20, the first time featuring all of the members in a variety show.

In May 2015, BigBang started a cover contest, the contestant can upload any type of cover for "Loser" and "Bae Bae". The winners will win album, get featured on the playlist of BigBang's official YouTube Channel and get the chance to audition at YG Entertainment. The submission started on May 18 till May 29, 2015. a total of 404 videos were submitted, the winners were announced on June 19.

== Accolades ==
Awards and nominations for M
Year	Ceremony	Award	Result	Ref.
2015	Gaon Chart Music Awards	Album of the Year (2nd Quarter)	Nominated	
2015	Melon Music Awards	Album of the Year	Nominated	
2015	Mnet Asian Music Awards	Album of the Year	Nominated	

== Track listing ==
M track listing
No.	Title	Lyrics	Music	Arrangement	Length
1.	"Loser"	Teddy; T.O.P; G-Dragon	Teddy; Taeyang	Teddy	3:39
2.	"Bae Bae"	G-Dragon; Teddy; T.O.P	Teddy; G-Dragon; T.O.P	Teddy	2:49
Total length:					6:28

M – CD only (bonus tracks)
No.	Title	Music	Arrangement	Length
3.	"Loser" (instrumental)	Teddy; Taeyang	Teddy	3:39
4.	"Bae Bae" (Instrumental)	Teddy; G-Dragon; T.O.P	Teddy	2:49
Total length:				12:56

M (CD) – Special version of iTunes
No.	Title	Length
1.	"Loser" (a cappella)	3:39
2.	"Loser" (MR)	3:39
3.	"Loser" (instrumental)	3:39
4.	"Bae Bae" (a cappella)	2:49
5.	"Bae Bae" (MR)	2:49
6.	"Bae Bae" (instrumental)	2:49
Total length:		19:24

== Charts ==
=== Weekly charts ===
Chart (2015)	Peak position
South Korean Albums (Gaon)	1
Taiwanese Albums (G-Music)	1

=== Monthly charts ===
Chart (April 2015)	Peak position
South Korean Albums (Gaon) (Note: M's position on the Gaon Chart refers to the April pre-order.)	2

=== Year-end chart ===
Chart (2015)	Position
South Korean Albums (Gaon)	14

== Sales ==
Chart	Sales
South Korea (Gaon)	140,098

== Release history ==
Region	Date	Format	Label
Worldwide	May 1, 2015	Digital download	YG
South Korea	May 1, 2015	CD, digital download	YG; KT Music
Taiwan	May 12, 2015	CD, digital download	Warner Music Taiwan
Japan	May 27, 2015	Digital download	YGEX
