= Sober (BigBang song) =

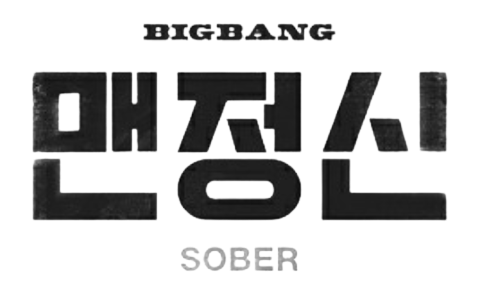
- Promotional logo

Single by BigBang

from the album Made
- Language: Korean
- A-side: "If You"
- Released: July 1, 2015
- Studio: YG (Seoul)
- Genre: Pop rock
- Length: 3:57
- Label: YG
- Songwriters: Teddy Park; G-Dragon; T.O.P
- Producers: Teddy; Choice37; G-Dragon

BigBang singles chronology
| "If You" (2015) | "Sober" (2015) | "Zutter" (2015) |

Music video
- "Sober" on YouTube

"Sober" (Korean: 맨정신; RR: Maenjeongsin) is a song recorded by South Korean boy band BigBang. It was released digitally on July 1, 2015 by YG Entertainment, as the third single from Made, being included in the single album D. "Sober" was written by Teddy, G-Dragon and T.O.P, and was produced by the first two with Choice37.

== Background ==
The first poster of "Sober" was released on June 27, 2015, revealing the name of the song and the production credits. The single was released on July 1. The release was supported by a live countdown on Naver Starcast on June 30 at 11 PM, an hour before its official release. An exact verse that G-Dragon sings towards the end of "Sober" was actually first performed during the 2013 Mnet Asian Music Awards as a prelude to his song "Crooked". The music video was directed by Han Sa Min, who worked before with Bigbang on "Loser", "Bad Boy" and "Blue".

== Composition and reception ==
"Sober" has a "more rock-driven sound", an unusual genre for BigBang, who usually go for electronic and hip hop-based sounds. The track shows off lush guitars mixed with banging percussion, and incorporates a "very high energy rock vibe" with a spunk delivery. Fuse said that the song fits on alternative radio and it's something you can hear on the Warped Tour, that is famous of alternative and punk rock music. The Korean website Osen called it "an exciting summer song that perfectly fits the [season]."

The music video was described by Billboard as "going mad in a colorful world." China Topix noted that "Sober" was filmed in a unique style, keeping the summer mood in mind.

== Commercial performance ==
"Sober" sold 276,180 downloads in its first week on the Gaon Chart, and debuted at number two in the Digital and Download charts, seven on both the BGM and Streaming charts with over 3.9 million streams.

The song charted at number three on Billboard World Digital Songs, The song ranked at eleven on the most popular Korean singles of 2015 in Taiwan by music streaming service KKBOX.

== Accolades ==
Music program awards for "Sober"
| Program | Date | Ref. |
|---|---|---|
| M! Countdown | July 9, 2015 | |
| Show! Music Core | July 11, 2015 | |
| Inkigayo | July 12, 2015 | |

== Charts ==
=== Weekly charts ===
Weekly chart performance for "Sober"
| Chart (2015) | Peak position |
|---|---|
| Japan (Japan Hot 100) | 24 |
| South Korea (Gaon) | 2 |
| US World Digital Songs (Billboard) | 3 |

=== Monthly charts ===
Monthly chart performance for "Sober"
| Chart (July 2015) | Peak position |
|---|---|
| South Korea (Gaon) | 4 |

=== Year-end charts ===
Year-end chart performance for "Sober"
| Chart (2015) | Position |
|---|---|
| South Korea (Gaon) | 42 |
| US World Digital Songs (Billboard) | 12 |

== Sales ==
Sales figures for "Sober"
| Country | Sales |
|---|---|
| South Korea | 1,317,469 |

== Release history ==
Release history and formats for "Sober"
| Region | Date | Format | Label |
|---|---|---|---|
| South Korea | July 1, 2015 | Digital download | YG Entertainment, KT Music |
| Various | July 1, 2015 | Digital download | YG Entertainment, KT Music |
| Japan | July 8, 2015 | Digital download | YG Entertainment, KT Music |
