= We Like 2 Party =

Single by BigBang

from the album Made
- Language: Korean
- A-side: "Bang Bang Bang"
- Released: June 1, 2015
- Studio: YG (Seoul)
- Genre: Hip-hop
- Length: 3:16
- Label: YG
- Songwriters: Teddy; Kush; G-Dragon; T.O.P
- Producers: Teddy; Kush; Seo Won-jin; G-Dragon

BigBang singles chronology
"Bang Bang Bang" (2015)	"We Like 2 Party" (2015)	"If You" (2015)

Music video
- "We Like 2 Party" on YouTube

"We Like 2 Party" is a song recorded by South Korean boy band Big Bang. It was released digitally on June 5, 2015, by YG Entertainment, as the second single from Made, being included in the single album A. It was written by Teddy, Kush and group members G-Dragon and T.O.P. The first three also produced the track with Seo Won Jin.

== Background ==
The first poster announcing "We Like 2 Party" was released on May 28, 2015, by YG Entertainment. A second poster was released a day later, revealing the production credits. The song was banned from KBS due to the use of profanity and the mentioning of brand names in the track. In response YG Entertainment reportedly considered to edit the song, but to this date they have not.

== Commercial performance ==
In its first week, "We Like 2 Party" peaked at number three on the Gaon Digital Chart with 278,367 downloads sold. At the end of June, "We Like 2 Party" was the second-best-selling single of the month in South Korea, only behind their own song "Bang Bang Bang". It sold 515,406 downloads and gained over 16.9 million streams.

The song ranked at nine as the best Korean singles of 2015 in Taiwan.

== Music video ==
The "We Like 2 Party" music video was shot on Jeju Island on May 19, 2015. It features self-recorded footage from the members themselves, who were drunk during the filming in order to have a more natural feeling for the music video. Their label explained that the intention was to show "the comfortable image of Big Bang rather than a more weighted-down Big Bang." The music video showed a carefree side of BigBang, playing, partying and drinking alcohol, unlike their previous videos, which were known for their powerful images. Billboard noted that BigBang showed a playful side of themselves and their strong friendship.

The music video was the third-most-viewed K-Pop video both in the United States and worldwide in June 2015 according to Billboard. "We Like 2 Party" was also chosen as one of the best K-pop music videos of June by KpopStarz, with the website complimenting the "casual and inviting feeling the music video gives off from start to finish", describing it as "unscripted, ridiculous, and easily gets [u]s into the party mood."

== Charts ==
=== Weekly charts ===
Weekly chart performance for "We Like 2 Party"
Chart (2015)	Peak position
Japan (Japan Hot 100)	27
South Korea (Gaon)	3
US World Digital Song Sales (Billboard)	2

=== Monthly charts ===
Monthly chart performance for "We Like 2 Party"
Chart (June 2015)	Peak position
South Korea (Gaon)	4

=== Year-end charts ===
Year-end chart performance for "We Like 2 Party"
Chart (2015)	Peak position
South Korea (Gaon)	43
US World Digital Song Sales (Billboard)	19

== Sales ==
Sales for "We Like 2 Party"
Country	Sales
South Korea (digital)	1,206,186
United States (digital)	7,000

== Release history ==
Release history and formats for "We Like 2 Party"
Region	Date	Format	Label
South Korea	June 1, 2015	Digital download	YG Entertainment, KT Music
Various	June 1, 2015	Digital download	YG Entertainment, KT Music
Japan	June 17, 2015	Digital download	YG Entertainment, YGEX
