= If You (BigBang song) =

Single by BigBang

from the album Made
- Language: Korean
- A-side: "Sober"
- Released: July 1, 2015
- Studio: YG (Seoul)
- Genre: K-ballad
- Length: 4:24
- Label: YG
- Songwriter: G-Dragon
- Producers: G-Dragon; P.K; Dee.P

BigBang singles chronology
"We Like 2 Party" (2015)	"If You" (2015)	"Sober" (2015)

"If You" is a song recorded by South Korean boy band BigBang. It was released digitally on July 1, 2015 by YG Entertainment, as the third single from Made, being included in the single album D. It was written by group member G-Dragon who also produced the song with P.K and Dee.P. "If You" became a chart-topper in South Korea's Gaon Digital Chart, and went on to sell over five million digital units across Asia.

== Background ==
The first poster of D was released on June 26, 2015, announcing "If You" and its release date as July 1. The release was supported by a live countdown on Naver Starcast on June 30.

It was announced that the song will have no music video, unlike the other singles that BigBang released that year. An official from their label, YG, revealed to Star News that "the reason why it does not have a music video is because since Big Bang's debut in 2006, 'If You' is their saddest song ever. 'If You' is a track that will touch you emotionally. A music video wasn't shot so that you can focus on the music and lyrics only." This is the first song in which all of the members of BigBang sing, as typically before T.O.P and G-Dragon would rap.

== Critical reception and accolades ==
Billboard felt that "If You" was one of the group's "most instantly striking pieces in years." Korean website Osen called it "the saddest song ever in Big Bang's history." G-Dragon received good reviews for his writing, being praised for showing "his formidible [sic] songwriting chops, evoking the complexity of "Lies" or "Haru Haru."

"If You" won Song of the Month for July at the 2016 Gaon Chart Music Awards. It additionally received four weekly Melon popularity awards on July 13, July 20, July 27, and August 10, 2015.

== Commercial performance ==
"If You" had 308,120 downloads sold in its first week on the Gaon Chart, the fourth-highest first week sales in 2015, and peaked at number one on the Digital Chart. The song also debuted at number two on the BGM Chart, four on the Streaming Chart with over 4.8 million streams and at number 22 on the Mobile Chart. "If You" peaked at number two on the Billboard's World Digital Songs. Additionally, the single ranked at seventh as the most popular Korean singles of 2015 in Taiwan by music streaming service KKBOX.

== Charts ==
=== Weekly charts ===
Weekly chart performance for "If You"
Chart (2015)	Peak position
Japan (Japan Hot 100)	29
South Korea (Gaon)	1
UK Indie Breakers (OCC)	11
US World Digital Songs (Billboard)	2

Weekly chart performance for "If You"
Chart (2025–2026)	Peak position
Singapore Regional (RIAS)	14
Vietnam (Vietnam Hot 100)	95

=== Monthly charts ===
Monthly chart performance for "If You"
Chart (2015)	Peak position
South Korea (Gaon)	1

=== Year-end charts ===
Year-end chart performance for "If You"
Chart (2015)	Position
South Korea (Gaon)	29
US World Digital Songs (Billboard)	10

== Sales ==
Sales figures for "If You"
Country	Sales
South Korea (digital)	1,445,147

== Release history ==
Release history and formats for "If You"
Region	Date	Language	Format	Label	Ref.
South Korea	July 1, 2015	Korean	Digital download	YG Entertainment, KT Music	
Various	July 1, 2015	Korean	Digital download	YG Entertainment, KT Music	
Japan	July 8, 2015	Korean	Digital download	YG Entertainment, KT Music	
Japan	February 3, 2016	Japanese	Digital download	YGEX, Avex Trax	
