= Bae Bae =

2015 single by Big Bang

Single by BigBang

from the album Made
- Language: Korean
- A-side: "Loser"
- Released: May 1, 2015
- Genre: Trap; hip-hop; R&B
- Length: 3:39
- Label: YG
- Songwriters: G-Dragon; Teddy Park
- Producers: Teddy; G-Dragon; T.O.P

BigBang singles chronology
"Loser" (2015)	"Bae Bae" (2015)	"Bang Bang Bang" (2015)

Music video
- "Bae Bae" on YouTube

"Bae Bae" is a song recorded by South Korean boy band Big Bang. It was released as a digital single on May 1, 2015, through YG Entertainment, serving as one of the eight lead singles from the band's third Korean-language studio album Made (2016); the song, along with "Loser", was initially included in the single album M. It marks the band's first release in three years, since Still Alive in June 2012. Written and produced by G-Dragon, Teddy Park and T.O.P, "Bae Bae" was noted for its sexually suggestive lyrics and music video.

The song was a commercial success, peaking at number 2 on both the Gaon Digital Chart and US World Digital Song Sales chart. By the end of the year, the single sold more than 1.4 million digital units and was ranked as the fourth best performing song of the year in the country—simultaneously making BigBang the first act to have three songs within the top five on the year-end Gaon Digital Chart.

== Background and composition ==
YG Entertainment announced the title tracks of BigBang's "MADE Series: M" in the third teaser, including two singles, "Loser" and "Bae Bae". Two of the four teasers for D-1 to D-4 consist of the song info, including who was responsible for the tracks' composition.

"Bae Bae" is a trap-infected hip-hop/R&B song, in style of country music that was noted for its "boundary-pushing elements" and sexual references. The song uses instrumentation from guitar. G-Dragon revealed that the song was inspired by the work of British artist Francis Bacon. He explained that "one day I was looking at some of Francis Bacon's work in a museum and it strangely felt erotic to me. I'm not sure why." And added "we were working on the album at the time, while I was writing the music, I kept looking at his paintings. So they inspired me a lot one way or another."

== Critical reception ==
Billboard ranked "Bae Bae" at number fifteen in their "20 Best K-Pop Songs of 2015" list while Dazed placed the track at number eight in their list of the same name, stating that the song "offered a playful wander through young love in contrast to their signature airtight construction, with rappers G-Dragon and T.O.P delivering a bouncing, energetic flow while Taeyang, Daesung and Seungri's vocals smoothed out its brashest moments." Korean online magazine IZM also named it one of best singles of the year, complimenting the song's confidence over its "shameless beat", and how the track was able to get the unusual achievement of being both popular in the mainstream and an experimental piece.

The Chicago Sun-Times included the track in their unranked list of ten best BigBang songs. In a survey involving 30 music industry experts by South Korean magazine The Dong-a Ilbo, "Bae Bae" was chosen as the fifth best male idol song in the past 20 years. While commenting on the single, Alicia Tan from Mashable stated that "one can't deny how Big Bang always hits the nail on the head when it comes to balancing out soothing vocals with hard-hitting rap to make on point songs." "Bae Bae" was nominated for Best Rap/Hip-Hop Song and won Song of the Year at the 2016 edition of the critics given Korean Music Awards.

"Bae Bae" on critic lists
Publication	List	Rank	Ref.
Billboard	The 20 Best K-Pop Songs of 2015	15	
Billboard	The 100 Greatest K-Pop Songs of the 2010s	40	
Dazed	The Top 20 K-Pop Tracks of 2015	8	
The Dong-a Ilbo	Best male idol songs in the past 20 years	5	
Vice	The Top 20 K-pop Songs of 2015	15	

== Awards and nominations ==
Awards for "Bae Bae"
Year	Organization	Award	Result	Ref.
2015	Mnet Asian Music Awards	Best Music Video	Won	
2015	RTHK Top Ten Chinese Music Awards	Ten Best Sales Digital Releases	Won	
2016	Korean Music Awards	Song of the Year	Won	
2016	Korean Music Awards	Best Rap & Hip-Hop Song	Nominated	

== Commercial performance ==
With only two days in the tracking week, "Bae Bae" debuted at number two on the Gaon Download Chart with 217,594 sales, number three on the Digital Chart, and number 15 on the Streaming Chart. On the second week, the single rose to number two on the Digital and Streaming Chart, while it remained second on the Download Chart, with 178,764 copies sold. "Bae Bae" sold 828,966 copies in two months. By the end of the year, "Bae Bae" sold 1,421,715 digital units, making it the seventh most downloaded single in the country in 2015.

The song debuted on Billboard's 'World Digital Songs' chart at number two, behind the group's own "Loser" on May 7. The music video was the fourth most viewed K-pop video in the U.S. and around the world for the month of April, according to Billboard, with only two days worth of views. The song ranked eight as the most popular Korean singles in 2015 in Taiwan by music streaming service KKBOX. In Hong Kong, "Bae Bae" was one of the ten best-selling songs of 2015, and received a digital award by the RTHK.

== Music video ==
The music video was directed by Seo Hyun-seung, who previously directed "Fantastic Baby" (2012). The video includes various erotic, yet not explicit references, which was deemed "rather risque for K-pop standards." It starts with G-Dragon rubbing female mannequins and it continues with Taeyang dressed as a cowboy. T.O.P's part was noted for its heavy innuendos, with the rapper symbolically ejaculating with a syringe while cosplaying as the Joker. Then Daesung gets "hot and heavy" with his love interests. Seungri's visuals were described as "masquerading as a Christian Grey-esque sugar daddy in what looks like an Evanescence video circa 2000." At the end, the five members unite on the moon with a pack of models dressed as Disney princesses.

Billboard referred to "Bae Bae" one of the most sexual K-pop videos from a male group ever. Fuse noticed how the group "defies norms" with the video's "craziest visual." Vulture.com choose the single in the "10 Best New Songs of the Week," stating that "Big Bang is the best at blending aesthetics, and the music video is a prime example of how they jump from romance-novel realness to the Mad Hatter like a psychedelic bumblebee in." "Bae Bae" won Best Music Video at the 2015 Mnet Asian Music Awards.

== Chart performance ==
=== Weekly charts ===
Weekly chart performance for "Bae Bae"
Chart (2015)	Peak position
Finland Download (Latauslista)	30
South Korea (Gaon)	2
US World Digital Songs (Billboard)	2

=== Monthly charts ===
Monthly chart performance for "Bae Bae"
Chart (May 2015)	Peak position
South Korea (Gaon)	2

=== Year-end charts ===
Year-end chart performance for "Bae Bae"
Chart (2015)	Position
South Korea (Gaon)	4
US World Digital Songs (Billboard)	11

== Sales ==
Sales figures for "Bae Bae"
Country	Sales
South Korea (digital)	1,739,205
United States (digital)	8,000

== Release history ==
Release history and formats for "Bae Bae"
Region	Date	Format	Label
South Korea	May 1, 2015	Digital download	YG Entertainment
Various	May 1, 2015	Digital download	YG Entertainment
Japan	May 27, 2015	Digital download	YGEX
