= Loser (BigBang song) =

2015 single by Big Bang

Single by BigBang

from the album Made
- Language: Korean; Japanese
- A-side: "Bae Bae"
- Released: May 1, 2015
- Studio: YG (Seoul)
- Genre: R&B; hip hop
- Length: 3:39
- Label: YG
- Songwriters: Teddy; Taeyang; T.O.P; G-Dragon
- Producers: Teddy; Taeyang

BigBang singles chronology
"Monster" (2012)	"Loser" (2015)	"Bae Bae" (2015)

Music video
- "Loser" on YouTube

"Loser" is a song by South Korean boy band BigBang. It was released on May 1, 2015, alongside "Bae Bae" as the group's fifth single album M, and as the first single of their third Korean-language studio album Made (2016). The single marked BigBang's first release since Still Alive (2012). Written by G-Dragon, T.O.P, Teddy and produced by Teddy alongside Taeyang, "Loser" has been described as a hip hop and R&B song.

"Loser" was a commercial success for the group. It debuted atop the Gaon Digital Chart, topping the chart for three consecutive weeks and finishing as the second best-performing song of 2015. Furthermore, it topped Billboard's World Digital Song Sales chart and reached the charts in Finland and Japan.

== Background ==
YG Entertainment announced the tracks of BigBang's "MADE Series: M" in the third teaser, including two singles, "Loser" and "Bae Bae". Two of the four teasers D-1 to D-4 consist of song information, including credits for the tracks' composition. "Loser" was created within 2–3 months in late 2014 and early 2015.

== Composition and lyrics ==
"Loser" has been described as a melancholy hip hop and R&B song with a slow melody. The song was composed using common time in the key of E♭ major, with a moderate tempo of 90 beats per minute. The vocals span from the lower octave of F_{4} to the two-lined higher note of B♭_{5}. Billboard compared the song with "the previously heard brilliance in songs like 'Bad Boy,' 'Lies' and 'Blue'," and highlighted how the track "stripped away all trendy elements for a straightforward, acoustic-leaning take on baring what lies deep in each of our consciousness." The song's lyrics were noted to be "confessional," showing that even superstars have insecurities. Standing out from other BigBang songs for not falling in the love song category, the lyrics described feelings of doubt and unhappiness that accompany the everyday life of a self-proclaimed loser, while also detailing "unhappiness with one-night stands and forgetting the importance of love." G-Dragon explained the meaning behind the lyrical-content, saying that "people who stand under the spotlight are just human beings," saying that all humans have their feelings hurt, but also the songs adept on all the situations, saying "however, we wanted to offer a [more universal] theme with this song, so we drew a bigger picture. Somebody may not have a friend and somebody may not have love, you know? Everyone lives in a different situation. Depending on how you accept it, this song could be your story."

== Reception ==
=== Commercial ===
"Loser" debuted atop the Gaon Digital Chart with two days of tracking, selling around 256,000 digital copies. It topped the chart for two more weeks and finished as the month's best-performing song selling 770,000 digital copies. It spent eight weeks in the top ten and left the chart after 24 weeks. "Loser" finished as the second-best performing song of 2015, selling 1,505,163 digital units. "Loser" debuted on Billboard's "World Digital Songs" chart at number one on May 7. The music video was the third most viewed K-pop video in the U.S. and around the world for the month of April, according to Billboard, with only two days worth of views. The song also ranked third as the most popular Korean singles in 2015 in Taiwan by music streaming service KKBOX.

=== Critical ===
"Loser" received critical acclaim upon release. The song was chosen by fuse as one of the best songs of 2015, the only non-English song on the list. The channel claimed that the track "moves you regardless of what language you speak." Billboard named "Loser" the best K-pop song of 2015, saying that the single "proved that a subtle take on all the things that make a group unique can speak so much louder" and concluding that "such an impassioned performance has you hooked from first listen." The magazine also called "Loser" the group's sixth essential song in honor of their tenth anniversary. Sun-Times included "Loser" in their unranked list of ten best BigBang songs. Consequence of Sound chose the song as one of the 10 most popular songs of 2015 that weren't in English. "Loser" won Best Pop Song at the 2016 edition of the critics given Korean Music Awards.

== Music video ==
The music video was directed by Han Sa Min, who previously directed "Blue," "Bad Boy," "Monster," and "Love Song." BigBang started filming secretly in Los Angeles between April 2, and April 8, 2015.

The music video has a story line for each member. G-Dragon starts his scenes in a lift, revealing a neck tattoo that reads Truth + Dare. He walks the streets alone, feeling isolated from the world, having forgotten what love feels like. Taeyang has a personal fight with his faith, holds a cross with the sentence "Sin will find you" written on it. In the end he apparently commits suicide and the cross breaks apart leaving the words "Sin will find you." Seungri has problems controlling his anger, kicking a car and destroying his room after seeing the girl that he loved with someone else. He repeatedly tries to call her, but to no avail. T.O.P cannot commit to one relationship. He doesn't accept them, and he seems to have no control over anything which leads him to kill the women that he had an affair with. Daesung gets attacked by a group of men. He tries to defend himself but can't and ends up covered in blood, helpless, and unable to stand. The music video showed a darker side that has never been seen in BigBang's music videos. In the end of the music video, all 5 members of the group were seen walking together away from the city.

On YouTube, "Loser" became the most viewed Kpop group video within 24 hours, with 4.5 million views. After two months, "Loser" became the second most viewed Kpop video of 2015. After a few days, it became the first, later being surpassed by BigBang's own "Bang Bang Bang." The video reached 100 million views on the same site in June 2016.

== Covers ==
Due to the song's popularity, it's been covered by many artists, including the vocal band Tritops, who released theirs on April 30. Epik High and F.T. Island's Choi Jong-hoon released covers via Instagram. On May 8, B.A.P's Jung Dae-hyun, released a cover on YouTube. Jun Sung Ahn also had made a violin cover of "Loser". Akdong Musician covered the song on Weekly Idol. Bambam, Choi Youngjae, and Kim Yugyeom also covered the song on KBS CoolFM.

== Accolades ==
"Loser" won a total on ten music program awards. On Inkigayo, "Loser" was awarded three times, breaking the tie with g.o.d, making BigBang the artist with the most songs that achieved a Triple Crown on Inkigayo. It also achieved one of the highest scores of all time on the program. On M Countdown, it became the eighth highest score in all time at the time. It additionally received five Melon Weekly Popularity Awards from May 11–25 and July 1–8, 2015.

Awards and nominations for "Loser"
Year	Organization	Award	Result	Ref.
2016	Golden Disc Awards	Digital Bonsang	Won	
2016	Golden Disc Awards	Digital Daesang	Won	
2016	Golden Disc Awards	Global Fan's Choice	Nominated	
2016	Korean Music Awards	Best Pop Song	Won	
2016	Gaon Chart K-Pop Awards	Song of the Year – May	Won	
2016	Top Ten Chinese Gold Songs Award	Ten Best Digital Releases	Won	

Music program awards
Program	Date	Ref.
Show! Music Core	May 9, 2015	
Show! Music Core	May 16, 2015	
Inkigayo	May 10, 2015	
Inkigayo	May 17, 2015	
Inkigayo	May 24, 2015	
M Countdown	May 14, 2015	
M Countdown	May 21, 2015	
Music Bank	May 15, 2015	
Music Bank	May 22, 2015	
Show Champion	May 20, 2015	

== Charts ==
=== Weekly charts ===
2015 weekly chart performance for "Loser"
Chart (2015)	Peak position
Finland Download (Latauslista)	26
Japan (Japan Hot 100)	42
South Korea (Gaon)	1
UK Indie Breakers (OCC)	9
US World Digital Songs (Billboard)	1

2026 weekly chart performance for "Loser"
Chart (2026)	Peak position
Singapore Regional (RIAS)	10

=== Monthly charts ===
Monthly chart performance for "Loser"
Chart (2015)	Position
South Korea (Gaon)	1

=== Year-end charts ===
Year-end chart performance for "Loser"
Chart (2015)	Position
South Korea (Gaon)	2
US World Digital Songs (Billboard)	9

== Release history ==
Release dates and formats for "Loser"
Region	Date	Language	Format	Label
South Korea	May 1, 2015	Korean	Digital download; streaming	YG Entertainment
Various	May 1, 2015	Korean	Digital download; streaming	YG Entertainment
Japan	May 27, 2015	Korean	Digital download; streaming	YGEX
Japan	February 3, 2016	Japanese	Digital download; streaming	YGEX
