= List of BigBang solo concert tours =

BigBang solo concert tours
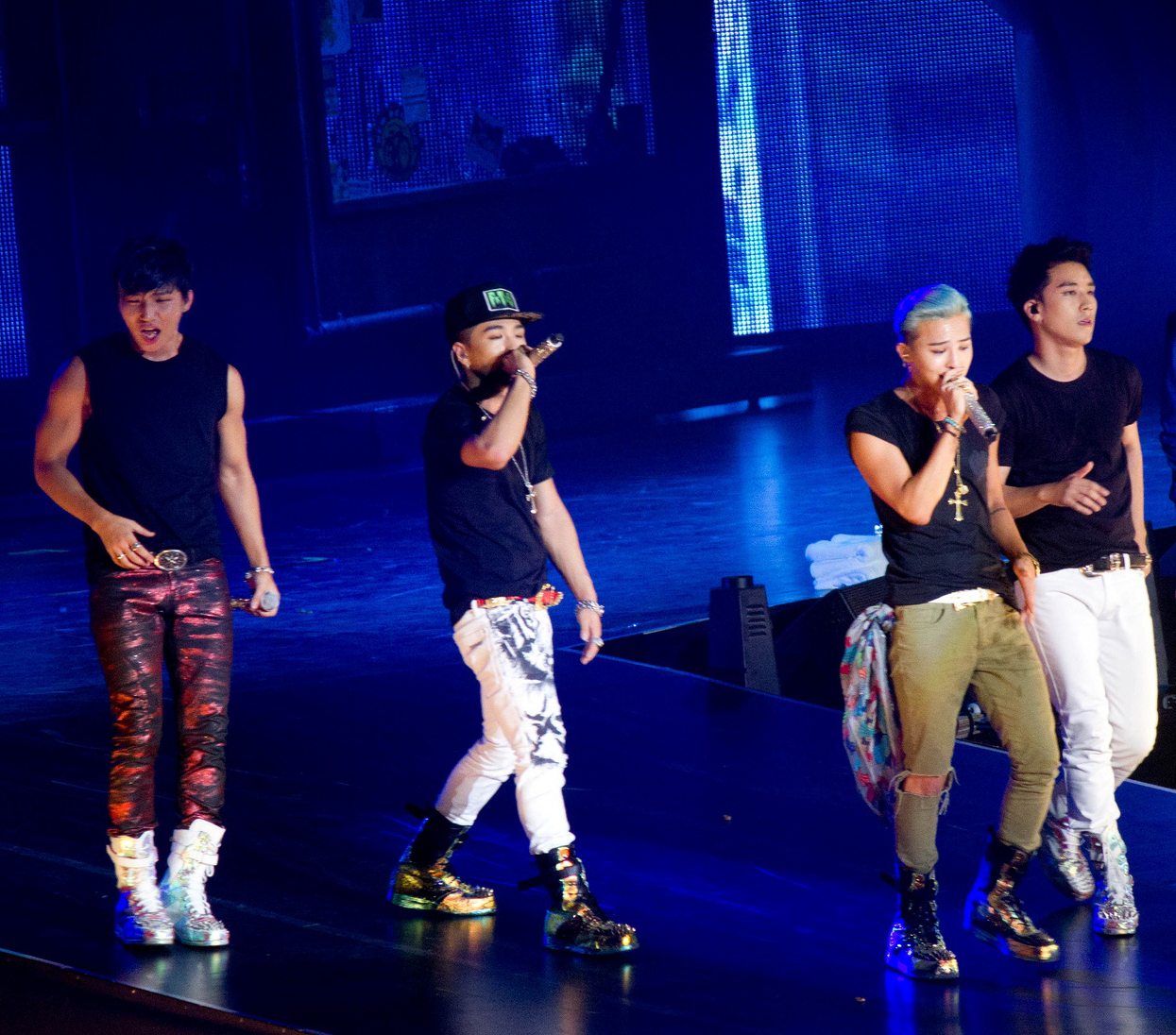
- Four members of BigBang have held solo tours. From left to right: Daesung, Taeyang, G-Dragon, Seungri
- G-Dragon: 3
- Taeyang: 4
- Daesung: 4
- Seungri: 3

BigBang members have all released solo material since their debut album Big Bang Vol.1, which included solo songs from each member. Four members: G-Dragon, Taeyang, Daesung, and Seungri have held solo concert tours. In 2008, Taeyang became the first member to hold a solo concert in support of his debut EP, Hot. In 2009, G-Dragon held his first concert, Shine a Light, in support of his debut album Heartbreaker. In 2010, Taeyang held his second concert in support of his first studio album Solar.

In March 2013, Daesung embarked on his debut concert tour in support of his debut Japanese-language album D'scover, while G-Dragon began his first world tour, The One of a Kind World Tour, which visited nine countries across Asia. From 2014 to 2015, Daesung and Taeyang both embarked on concert tours in support of their respective albums. Daesung's D'slove Tour visited eight cities in Japan while Taeyang's Rise World Tour visited nine Asian countries. In 2017, all three members embarked on solo tours after the success of BigBang's third studio album Made and its tour of the same name. Daesung held his first Japanese dome tour which consisted of two shows each at Seibu Prince Dome and Kyocera Dome. On his Act III: M.O.T.T.E World Tour, G-Dragon visited 29 cities across Asia, North America, Europe, and Oceania, becoming the first Korean solo artist to stage an arena tour in the latter three continents. G-Dragon also became the second Korean soloist to perform at the Tokyo Dome. Taeyang's White Night World Tour visited 19 cities across Asia and North America.

While T.O.P has never held a solo concert, he has held solo fan meetings in Japan in 2014. In 2017, Seungri held a fan meeting in Macau as a birthday party.

== G-Dragon ==
Year	Title	Duration	Setlist	Number of performances
2009	Shine a Light Concert	December 5–6, 2009 (South Korea)	1. "Heartbreaker"; 2. "This Love"; 3. "Hello" (feat. Dara); 4. "Gossip Man"; 5. "My Age Is 13" + "Storm" + "Fly Gentlemen" + "G-Dragon"; 6. "A Boy"; 7. "The Leaders" (feat. Teddy & CL); 8. "Breathe"; 9. "Butterfly"; 10. "But I Love U"; 11. "She's Gone" (feat. Kush); 12. "Only Look at Me" (with Taeyang); 13. "Korean Dream" (feat. Taeyang); 14. "One Year Station" Encore; 15. "Lies" (with BigBang); 16. "Last Farewell" (with BigBang); 17. "Heartbreaker"	2
Shine a Light was G-Dragon's debut concert, in support of his debut album Heartbreaker (2009). The concert was held at Olympic Gymnastics Arena with an attendance of 24,000 fans from 2 shows. On October 28, approximately 10,000 tickets were sold in the first round of ticket sales. On October 29, YG Entertainment announced that it had sold all 12,000 tickets in the first ten minutes of sales. The number of concurrent ticket buyers online reached 100,000, which brought a fierce ticket war with a rate of 1 in 10 users obtaining tickets. Additionally, G-Dragon was the first artist to sell out gymnastic stadiums in the second half of the year. The concert subsequently sparked controversy following complaints of obscenity and suggestive content.
2013	One of a Kind World Tour	March 30, 2013 — September 1, 2013	-	27
The One of a Kind World Tour was G-Dragon's first concert tour in support of his first EP One of a Kind (2012). The tour was announced on January 14, 2013, and was jointly directed by choreographers Travis Payne and Stacy Walker who previously worked on Michael Jackson's This Is It concerts. The stage was designed by Michael Cotten, who has decorated the stages of the Super Bowl, the Olympics and Jackson. The tour visited 9 countries and 13 cities in 2013, gathering a total of 570,000 fans, making it the most attended concert tour in history by a Korean solo artist.
2017	Act III: M.O.T.T.E World Tour	June 10, 2017 — October 8, 2017	-	36
The Act III: M.O.T.T.E 'Moment of Truth The End' World Tour was G-Dragon's second concert tour in support of his self-titled EP Kwon Ji Yong (2017). On March 31, it was reported by various media outlets that G-Dragon will perform at Seoul World Cup Stadium on June 10. YG Entertainment confirmed the concert a week later, making G-Dragon the second solo artist in history to perform at Seoul World Cup Stadium, after labelmate PSY. On April 25, it was announced that the tour would visit 18 cities across Asia, North America and Oceania. In mid-June, additional dates in Asia were announced, including stops in Hong Kong, Philippines, Indonesia, Malaysia and Taiwan. On June 26, YG Entertainment added five European cities to the tour, marking the first time for G-Dragon to stage a solo performance in Europe. Willo Perron served as the creative director for the tour, having previously worked with international artists such as Rihanna, Kanye West, and Drake.
2025	Übermensch World Tour	March 29, 2025 — December 14, 2025	-	39
The Übermensch World Tour is the fourth concert tour by South Korean rapper and singer-songwriter G-Dragon, held in support of his third studio album Übermensch (2025). It marks his first concert tour in eight years since the Act III: M.O.T.T.E World Tour (2017). The Übermensch World Tour began at the Goyang Stadium in South Korea on March 29, 2025. On February 6, 2025, G-Dragon's self-founded entertainment agency Galaxy Corporation announced that G-Dragon would hold a world tour in support of his then-upcoming studio album Übermensch, set for release on February 25. A week later, it was revealed that the tour would begin at the Goyang Stadium in Goyang, South Korea, on March 29 and 30. On March 19, fourteen dates were unveiled in East and Southeast Asia (Phase 1). On May 13, four new dates were unveiled in Australia and Thailand (Phase 2; the show in Thailand was cancelled later). On June 16, four new dates were announced in the United States and France (Phase 3). From September 12 to October 10, two shows in Vietnam and additional encore shows in Taiwan, Japan, and South Korea were announced.

== Taeyang ==
Year	Title	Duration	Setlist	Number of performances
2008	Hot Concert	July 20–21, 2008 (South Korea)	1. "Prayer"; 2. "Ma Girl"; 3. "Only Look at Me"; 4. "Sinner/Prisoner"; 5. "Don't Wanna Try" (Frankie J cover); 6. "Cracks of My Broken Heart" (Eric Benet cover); 7. "Baby I'm Sorry"; 8. "With You" (Chris Brown cover); 9. "Always"; 10. "Make Love"; 11. "A Fool's Only Tear" Encore; 12. "Look Only at Me"	2
The Hot Concert was Taeyang's first solo concert, in support of his first mini-album Hot (2008). The concert was held at Melon-AX Hall with Uhm Jung Hwa, Mighty Mouse and BigBang being guest performers. All 4,000 tickets were sold out.
2010	Solar Concert	September 25–26, 2010 (South Korea)	1. "Prayer"; 2. "I'll Be There"; 3. "Sinner"; 4. "Just a Feeling"; 5. "Move"; 6. "Ma Girl"; 7. "You're My"; 8. "I Need a Girl"; 9. "After You Fall Asleep"; 10. "Connection"; 11. "Slow Jam" (duet with IU); 12. IU – "Better in Time" (Leona Lewis cover); 13. "Baby, I'm Sorry"; 14. "Wedding Dress"; 15. "Superstar"; 16. "Break Down"; 17. "Only Look at Me and Make Love" (remix) Encore; 18. "Where U At"; 19. "Take It Slow" Re-encore; 20. "Only Look at Me"; 21. "Take It Slow"	2
The Solar Concert was Taeyang's second solo concert, in support of his debut album Solar (2010). The concert was held at Kyunghee University's Grand Peace Hall with IU being the guest performer. The two concerts drew a total of 9,000 fans.
2014–2015	Rise World Tour	August 12, 2014 – March 1, 2015	-	25
The Rise World Tour was Taeyang's first world tour in support of his second studio album Rise (2014). On May 30, 2014, YG Entertainment announced that Taeyang will kick off his first tour in Japan with four shows in two cities set to commence in mid-August. On September 5, 2014, two shows were announced in Seoul, which were sold out in less than ten minutes, and a third show was later added due high demand. In November 2014, nine cities across seven Asian countries were announced as a part of the world tour, including Hong Kong, China, Malaysia, Indonesia, Taiwan, Thailand and Singapore.
2017	White Night World Tour	July 8, 2017 – October 29, 2017	-	23
The White Night World Tour was Taeyang's second world tour in support of his third studio album White Night (2017). On March 31, 2017 it was announced that Taeyang is to hold two concerts in Japan in July at Chiba Marine Stadium. On April 21, two shows were announced at Kobe Sports Park Baseball Stadium in August. His labelmates Winner and Blackpink performed as the opening act for the shows at Chiba and Kobe respectively. On July 6, Taeyang announced two shows in Seoul, on August 26 and 27. The rest of the Asian leg was announced on August 10, with eight countries including Philippines, Hong Kong, Thailand, Indonesia, Malaysia, Macau, Singapore, and Taiwan. On July 12, the North American shows were announced with two stops in Canada and six in the United States.
2024–2025	The Light Year Tour	August 31, 2024 – February 22, 2025	-	18
The Light Year Tour was Taeyang's third solo concert tour and his first tour in over seven years, in support of his second EP Down to Earth (2023). The tour began with two shows at Olympic Hall in Seoul on August 31 and September 1, 2024, featuring guest appearances by his BigBang bandmates G-Dragon and Daesung. The tour covered several regions including South Korea, Japan, Hong Kong, Australia, Malaysia, Taiwan, Thailand, Macau, and the Philippines.

== Daesung ==
Year	Title	Duration	Setlist	Number of performances
2013	D'scover Tour	March 24, 2013 – June 18, 2013 (Japan)	-	25
The D'scover Tour was Daesung's debut concert tour and first tour in Japan. In December 2012, it was announced that Daesung was to hold four concerts at Kobe and Tokyo in support of his debut album D'scover. On February 28, 2013, it was announced that due to high demand, he would be holding an additional 21 concerts across 17 cities. All tickets from the tour were sold out.
2014–2015	D'slove Tour	June 11, 2014 – July 27, 2014 (Japan)	-	21
D'slove Tour was Daesung's second tour in Japan. In early 2014, it was announced that Daesung will embark on a second Japan tour, with 12 shows across 7 cities. More than 200,000 people applied for the tickets, which resulted in an additional performance at Nippon Budoukan and two additional shows at Osaka-jo Hall. Daesung launched the encore concert Encore!! 3D Tour [D-Lite DLive D’slove] in Yoyogi National Gymnasium and Osaka Jo Hall. Japanese singer Linda Yamamoto made a special appearance.
2017	D-lite Japan Dome Tour	April 15–16, 22–23, 2017 (Japan)	1. "To You"; 2. "Venus"; 3. "D-Day"; 4. "Powerful Boy"; 5. "Sunny Hill"; 6. "Anymore"; 7. "The Sign"; 8. "Shut Up"; 9. "Awake, Asleep"; 10. "Close Future"; 11. "Spring Breeze Melody"; 12. "Rainy Rainy"; 13. "Dress"; 14. "Wings"; 15. "Joyful"; 16. "Hello"; 17. "Just Can't Stop It"; 18. "Old Diary"; 19. "Look at Me, Gwisun" Encore; 20. "D-Day"; 21. "Venus"; 22. "Sunny Hill"; 23. "Powerful Boy"; 24. "Singer's Ballad"	4
D-lite Japan Dome Tour was Daesung's third Japanese tour and first dome tour, making him the second member of BigBang to tour dome arenas, after G-Dragon in 2013. He held two shows each at Seibu Prince Dome and Kyocera Dome with a total attendance of 150,000 fans.
2017	DなSHOW Vol.1	August 11, 2017 – October 31, 2017 (Japan); January 6, 2018 – January 7, 2018 (United States)	-	41
DなSHOW Vol.1 was Daesung's fourth Japanese tour. On June 26, 2017, YGEX announced that Daesung will embark on a nationwide solo hall tour, with 28 shows to beginning in August. Due to high demand, additional concerts were added totalling 39 concerts in 18 cities with an expected attendance of 88,000 people. On August 11, YGEX announced two final shows to be held in Honolulu at Hawaii Theatre.

== Seungri ==
Year	Title	Duration	Setlist	Number of performances
2012	V.I Fan Meeting in Japan	August 27, 2012 & September 9, 2012 (Japan)	-	2
V.I Fan Meeting in Japan was Seungri's first fans meeting in Japan, he held two shows, one at Shinkiba Studio Coast in Tokyo with 9,000 fans, and a second in Osaka at Dokima River Forum.
2018	V.I DJ Tour	April 13–30, 2018 (Japan)	-	4
V.I First tour as a DJ, he held four shows in four cities including Osaka, Fukuoka, Hiroshima, and Sapporo.
2018	The Great Seungri	4 Aug 2018-23 February 2019	-	22
Seungri 1st Solo Tour 2018 is Seungri first concert tour, first shows were announced in Japan, with 6 concerts in 3 cities including Chiba, Fukuoka, and Osaka.

== See also ==
- List of BigBang concert tours
