= Taeyang discography =

Artist discography

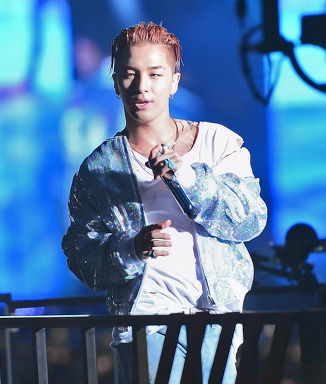
- Taeyang at BigBang's 0.TO.10 concert in Seoul, 2016
- Studio albums: 4
- Extended plays: 2
- Live albums: 2
- Singles: 15
- Video albums: 3
- Music videos: 10

South Korean singer Taeyang began his career as the main vocalist of the K-pop and hip-hop group Big Bang. His first solo single was "My Girl", included in BigBang's debut album Big Bang Vol.1 (2006). His first extended play, Hot (2008) yielded the chart-topper single "Only Look at Me". His first full-length album, Solar was released in July 2010 and became the first by an Asian artist to top iTunes charts in North America, in addition to peaking atop the Gaon Albums Chart.

Taeyang followed up with the release of his second studio album Rise in June 2014, which became the highest-charting album on the American Billboard 200 among solo Korean artists at the time it was released, while its lead-single, "Eyes, Nose, Lips", became the second best-performing single of 2014 in South Korea. His third album, White Night, was released in August 2017. His second extended play, Down to Earth, was released in April 2023 and marked his first album release in six years. The EP spawned the singles "Vibe" (featuring Jimin of BTS) and "Seed".

== Albums ==
=== Studio albums ===
Title	Album details	Peak chart positions								Sales
Title	Album details	KOR	FRA Digital	JPN	NZ Heat	US	US Heat	US Indie	US World	Sales
Solar	Released: July 1, 2010; Label: YG Entertainment; Format: CD, digital download	1	—	—	—	—	—	—	14	KOR: 105,000
Rise	Released: June 3, 2014; Label: YG Entertainment; Format: CD, digital download	1	55	—	—	112	1	20	1	KOR: 64,586; US: 3,000
White Night	Released: August 16, 2017; Label: YG Entertainment; Format: CD, digital download	3	33	8	7	—	5	12	1	KOR: 57,185; JPN: 14,642; US: 3,000
Quintessence	Released: May 18, 2026; Label: The Black Label; Format: CD, digital download	11	—	28	—	—	—	—	—	KOR: 61,158; JPN: 3,717
"—" denotes releases that did not chart or were not released in that region.

=== Compilation albums ===
Title	Album details	Peak chart positions	Sales
Title	Album details	JPN	Sales
Rise + Solar & Hot	Released: August 13, 2014; Label: YGEX; Format: CD, CD+DVD, digital download	2	JPN: 67,832

== Extended plays ==
Title	EP details	Peak chart positions		Sales
Title	EP details	KOR	JPN	Sales
Hot	Released: May 22, 2008; Label: YG Entertainment; Format: CD, digital download	1	—	KOR: 58,209
Down to Earth	Release date: April 25, 2023; Label: The Black Label; Format: CD, digital download	10	18	KOR: 77,841; JPN: 1,838

== Singles ==
=== As lead artist ===
List of singles as lead artist, with selected chart positions and certifications, showing year released and album name
Title	Year	Peak chart positions										Sales	Certifications	Album
Title	Year	KOR	KOR Billb. (Note: Includes the Billboard K-pop Hot 100 (defunct as of 2022), and Billboard South Korea Songs (2022 onwards).)	AUS	CAN	JPN Hot	UK	US	US World	VIE	WW	Sales	Certifications	Album
"Only Look at Me" (나만 바라봐)	2008	—	—	—	—	—	—	—	—	—	—	—N/a	—N/a	Hot
"Prayer" (기도) (featuring Teddy)	2008	—	—	—	—	—	—	—	—	—	—	—N/a	—N/a	Hot
"Where U At"	2009	—	—	—	—	—	—	—	—	—	—	—N/a	—N/a	Solar
"Wedding Dress"	2009	—	—	—	—	—	—	—	3	—	—	—N/a	—N/a	Solar
"I Need a Girl" (featuring G-Dragon)	2010	4	—	—	—	—	—	—	17	—	—	KOR: 1,876,167	—N/a	Solar
"I'll Be There" (Note: Included in the international edition of Solar.)	2010	16	—	—	—	—	—	—	—	—	—	—N/a	—N/a	Solar
"Ringa Linga" (링가링가)	2013	6	9	—	—	83	—	—	2	—	—	KOR: 704,187	—N/a	Rise
"Ringa Linga (Shockbit Remix)"	2013	—	—	—	—	—	—	—	—	—	—	—N/a	—N/a	Non-album single
"Eyes, Nose, Lips" (눈, 코, 입)	2014	1	1	—	—	—	—	—	3	—	—	KOR: 2,500,000	RIAJ: Gold (str.)	Rise
"1AM" (새벽한시)	2014	11	6	—	—	—	—	—	10	—	—	KOR: 372,923	—N/a	Rise
"Good Boy" (as GD X Taeyang)	2014	5	—	—	—	45	—	—	1	—	—	KOR: 1,260,683; US: 5,000	—N/a	Non-album single
"Darling"	2017	9	20	—	—	—	—	—	—	—	—	KOR: 255,812	—N/a	White Night
"Wake Me Up"	2017	20	29	—	—	—	—	—	5	—	—	KOR: 129,032	—N/a	White Night
"Vibe" (featuring Jimin)	2023	5	4	48	59	32	96	76	1	9	12	JPN: 12,010; US: 20,000; WW: 22,000	—N/a	Down to Earth
"Seed" (나의 마음에)	2023	75	—	—	—	—	—	—	—	—	—	—N/a	—N/a	Down to Earth
"Live Fast Die Slow"	2026	50	—	—	—	—	—	—	—	—	—	—N/a	—N/a	Quintessence
"—" denotes releases that did not chart or were not released in that region.

=== Promotional singles ===
Title	Year	Note	Ref.
"So Good"	2017	Collaboration with Lexus	
"Louder"	2018	Single for the 2018 Winter Olympics	

=== As featured artist ===
List of singles as collaboration & featured artist, with selected chart positions and certifications, showing year released and album name
Title	Year	Peak chart positions										Sales	Album
Title	Year	KOR	KOR Billb.	JPN	JPN Hot	MLY	NZ Hot	SGP	TWN	US World	WW	Sales	Album
"Everybody Get Down" (SWI.T featuring Taeyang)	2002	—	—	—	—	—	—	—	—	—	—	—N/a	Song Will Tell
"Player" (Wheesung featuring Taeyang)	2003	—	—	—	—	—	—	—	—	—	—	—N/a	It's Real
"Run" (Se7en featuring Taeyang & G-Dragon)	2006	—	—	—	—	—	—	—	—	—	—	—N/a	24/7
"Give Me Permission" (Se7en featuring Taeyang)	2006	—	—	—	—	—	—	—	—	—	—	—N/a	Se7olution
"Get Up" (Lexy featuring Taeyang)	2007	—	—	—	—	—	—	—	—	—	—	—N/a	Rush
"Rush" (Lexy featuring Taeyang)	2007	—	—	—	—	—	—	—	—	—	—	—N/a	Rush
"Super Fly" (Lexy featuring Taeyang, G-Dragon and T.O.P)	2007	—	—	—	—	—	—	—	—	—	—	—N/a	Rush
"Should Have Loved You Less" (Kim Johan featuring Taeyang)	2007	—	—	—	—	—	—	—	—	—	—	—N/a	Soul Family with Jo Han
"Real Talk" (YMGA featuring Taeyang)	2008	—	—	—	—	—	—	—	—	—	—	—N/a	Made in ROK
"Friend" (T.O.P and Taeyang)	2009	—	—	—	—	—	—	—	—	—	—	—N/a	Friend, Our Legend OST
"Fall in Love" (Thelma Aoyama featuring Taeyang)	2010	—	—	4	—	—	—	—	—	—	—	JPN: 44,000	Love! 2 – Thelma Best Collection
"By Instinct Remix" (Swings featuring Taeyang and Yoon Jong-shin)	2011	—	—	—	—	—	—	—	—	—	—	—N/a	Non-album single
"Tomorrow" (Tablo featuring Taeyang)	2011	5	—	—	—	—	—	—	—	—	—	KOR: 1,477,349	Fever's End Part 2
"Let's Talk About Love" (Seungri featuring G-Dragon & Taeyang)	2013	15	31	—	—	—	—	—	—	9	—	KOR: 121,416	Let's Talk About Love
"Go Crazy" (M-Flo featuring Taeyang)	2014	—	—	—	—	—	—	—	—	—	—	—N/a	Future Is Wow
"Rich" (Epik High featuring Taeyang)	2014	7	—	—	—	—	—	—	—	—	—	KOR: 349,008	Shoebox
"Fear" (Song Min-ho featuring Taeyang)	2015	3	—	—	—	—	—	—	—	9	—	KOR: 1,544,751	Non-album single
"Love" (Psy featuring Taeyang)	2017	12	—	—	—	—	—	—	—	—	—	KOR: 182,345	4X2=8
"Warigari" (Peejay featuring Kush and Taeyang)	2017	—	—	—	—	—	—	—	—	—	—	—N/a	Walkin' Vol. 2
"Home Sweet Home" (G-Dragon featuring Taeyang and Daesung)	2024	1	1	—	21	4	17	5	3	—	27	JPN: 4,229; WW: 8,000	Übermensch
"—" denotes releases that did not chart or were not released in that region.

== Other charted songs ==
Title	Year	Peak chart positions										Sales	Album
Title	Year	KOR	KOR Billb.	HUN	MLY	NZ Hot	SGP	TWN	US World	VIE	WW	Sales	Album
"Just a Feeling"	2010	50	—	—	—	—	—	—	—	—	—	—N/a	Solar
"You're My"	2010	52	—	—	—	—	—	—	—	—	—	—N/a	Solar
"Superstar"	2010	58	—	—	—	—	—	—	—	—	—	—N/a	Solar
"After You Fall Asleep"	2010	68	—	—	—	—	—	—	—	—	—	—N/a	Solar
"Move"	2010	80	—	—	—	—	—	—	—	—	—	—N/a	Solar
"Break Down"	2010	86	—	—	—	—	—	—	—	—	—	—N/a	Solar
"Take it Slow"	2010	91	—	—	—	—	—	—	—	—	—	—N/a	Solar
"Stay with Me"	2014	7	4	—	—	—	—	—	4	—	—	KOR: 389,779	Rise
"This Aint İt" (이게 아닌데)	2014	19	12	—	—	—	—	—	—	—	—	KOR: 178,448	Rise
"Body" (아름다워)	2014	20	14	—	—	—	—	—	22	—	—	KOR: 177,810	Rise
"Let Go" (버리고)	2014	21	15	—	—	—	—	—	—	—	—	KOR: 165,547	Rise
"Love You to Death"	2014	22	16	—	—	—	—	—	12	—	—	KOR: 141,097	Rise
"İntro"	2014	49	—	—	—	—	—	—	—	—	—	KOR: 54,727	Rise
"Tonight" (오늘밤) (featuring Zico)	2017	45	—	—	—	—	—	—	—	—	—	KOR: 37,840	White Night
"Empty Road" (텅빈도로)	2017	65	—	—	—	—	—	—	—	—	—	KOR: 33,125	White Night
"White Night"	2017	67	—	—	—	—	—	—	—	—	—	KOR: 31,235	White Night
"Ride"	2017	80	—	—	—	—	—	—	—	—	—	KOR: 27,368	White Night
"Naked"	2017	86	—	—	—	—	—	—	—	—	—	KOR: 26,830	White Night
"Amazin'"	2017	87	—	—	—	—	—	—	—	—	—	KOR: 26,466	White Night
"Shoong!" (슝!) (featuring Lisa)	2023	119	23	9	11	31	9	13	11	35	143	—N/a	Down to Earth
"Reason" (나는)	2023	— (Note: "Reason" did not enter the Circle Digital Chart, but peaked at number 42 on the component Download Chart.)	—	—	—	—	—	—	—	—	—	—N/a	Down to Earth
"Inspiration" (featuring Beenzino)	2023	— (Note: "Inspiration" did not enter the Circle Digital Chart, but peaked at number 32 on the component Download Chart.)	—	—	—	—	—	—	—	—	—	—N/a	Down to Earth
"Nightfall" (featuring Bryan Chase)	2023	— (Note: "Nightfall" did not enter the Circle Digital Chart, but peaked at number 37 on the component Download Chart.)	—	—	—	—	—	—	—	—	—	—N/a	Down to Earth
"Bad"	2026	— (Note: "Bad" did not enter the Circle Digital Chart, but peaked at number 36 on the component Download Chart.)	—	—	—	—	—	—	—	—	—	—N/a	Quintessence
"Would You" (featuring Tarzzan and Woochan)	2026	— (Note: "Would You" did not enter the Circle Digital Chart, but peaked at number 31 on the component Circle Download Chart.)	—	—	—	—	—	—	—	—	—	—N/a	Quintessence
"Movie"	2026	— (Note: "Movie" did not enter the Circle Digital Chart, but peaked at number 38 on the component Circle Download Chart.)	—	—	—	—	—	—	—	—	—	—N/a	Quintessence
"Open Up" (featuring the Kid Laroi)	2026	— (Note: "Open Up" did not enter the Circle Digital Chart, but peaked at number 35 on the component Circle Download Chart.)	—	—	—	—	—	—	—	—	—	—N/a	Quintessence
"Love Like This"	2026	— (Note: "Love Like This" did not enter the Circle Digital Chart, but peaked at number 46 on the component Circle Download Chart.)	—	—	—	—	—	—	—	—	—	—N/a	Quintessence
"Yes"	2026	— (Note: "Yes" did not enter the Circle Digital Chart, but peaked at number 47 on the component Circle Download Chart.)	—	—	—	—	—	—	—	—	—	—N/a	Quintessence
"Now"	2026	— (Note: "Now" did not enter the Circle Digital Chart, but peaked at number 48 on the component Circle Download Chart.)	—	—	—	—	—	—	—	—	—	—N/a	Quintessence
"G.O.A.T"	2026	— (Note: "G.O.A.T" did not enter the Circle Digital Chart, but peaked at number 49 on the component Circle Download Chart.)	—	—	—	—	—	—	—	—	—	—N/a	Quintessence
"4U"	2026	— (Note: "4U" did not enter the Circle Digital Chart, but peaked at number 50 on the component Circle Download Chart.)	—	—	—	—	—	—	—	—	—	—N/a	Quintessence
"—" denotes releases that did not chart or were not released in that region.

== Songwriting credits ==
All song credits are adapted from the Korea Music Copyright Association's database, unless otherwise noted.

=== Solo work ===
List of songs, showing year released, and name of the album
Year	Song	Album	Lyricist		Composer	
Year	Song	Album	Credited	With	Credited	With
2010	"Where U At"	Solar	No	–	Yes	Teddy
2010	"Wedding Dress"	Solar	No	–	Yes	Teddy
2010	"Take it Slow"	Solar	Yes	–	Yes	Catalyst
2010	"Solar (Intro)"	Solar	No	–	Yes	Choice37
2010	"Just a Feeling"	Solar	No	–	Yes	Teddy
2014	"Body" (아름다워)	Rise	Yes	Teddy	Yes	Teddy, P.K, Dee.P
2014	"Eyes, Nose, Lips" (눈코입)	Rise	Yes	Teddy	No	–
2014	"Intro (Rise)"	Rise	Yes	Tablo, Choice37, Orzabal Roland, Hughes Christopher Merrick, Stanely Ian	Yes	Peejay, Orzabal Roland, Hughes Christopher Merrick, Stanely Ian
2014	"Let Go" (버리고)	Rise	No	–	Yes	P.K, Dee.P
2017	"So Good"	Non-album single	Yes	24, Vince	Yes	24, Vince
2017	"Naked"	White Night	No	–	Yes	24, Vince
2017	"Amazin"	White Night	Yes	24, Vince	Yes	24, Vince, Teddy
2017	"Tonight" (오늘밤) (featuring Zico)	White Night	Yes	Zico, Kush	Yes	Kush, Peejay
2017	"Empty Road" (텅빈도로)	White Night	Yes	Vince, Kush	Yes	Seo Won-jin, Kush, Peejay
2017	"White Night" (백야)	White Night	Yes	Vince	Yes	24, Vince, 8!, Teddy, Brian Lee
2017	"Ride"	White Night	Yes	24, Vince	Yes	24, Vince
2018	"Louder"	Non-album single	Yes	Vince	Yes	R. Tee, Seo Won-jin, 24, Vince, Teddy
2023	"Vibe" (featuring Jimin)	Down to Earth	Yes	Vince	Yes	Teddy, Kush, Vince, Jimin, 24
2023	"Shoong!" (슝!) (featuring Lisa)	Down to Earth	Yes	Kush, Vince, Bekuh Boom	No	–
2023	"Seed" (나의 마음에)	Down to Earth	Yes	Kush	No	–
2023	"Reason" (나는)	Down to Earth	Yes	Kush, Vince	No	–
2023	"Inspiration" (featuring Beenzino)	Down to Earth	Yes	Beenzino, Vince	No	–
2023	"Nightfall" (featuring Bryan Chase)	Down to Earth	Yes	Bryan Chase	No	–

=== Work as Big Bang ===
List of songs, showing year released, and name of the album
Year	Song	Album	Lyricist		Composer	
Year	Song	Album	Credited	With	Credited	With
2006	"La La La"	Bigbang is V.I.P	Yes	G-Dragon, T.O.P, Daesung, Seungri	No	–
2006	"V.I.P"	Bigbang is V.I.P	Yes	G-Dragon, T.O.P, Daesung, Seungri	No	–
2006	"Good Bye Baby"	Big Bang 03	Yes	–	No	–
2006	"Intro (Big Bang)"	Big Bang Vol.1	Yes	G-Dragon, T.O.P, Daesung, Seungri	No	–
2007	"Intro (We Are Big Bang)" (우린빅뱅)	Always	Yes	G-Dragon, T.O.P, Daesung, Seungri	No	–
2015	"Loser"	Made	No	–	Yes	Teddy
2016	"Last Dance"	Made	Yes	G-Dragon, T.O.P	No	–

=== Other artists ===
List of songs, showing year released, and name of the album
Year	Artist	Song	Album	Lyricist		Composer	
Year	Artist	Song	Album	Credited	With	Credited	With
2002	YG Family	"Unfold at a Higher Place" (저높은곳에펼쳐)	Why Be Normal?	Yes	G-Dragon	No	–
2007	Lexy	"Super Fly" (featuring Taeyang, G-Dragon & T.O.P)	Rush	Yes	G-Dragon, T.O.P, Daesung, Seungri, Lexy	No	–
2012	Seven	"Somebody Else"	Se7en	Yes	Teddy Park	Yes	Teddy Park
2013	Seungri	"Let's Talk About Love" (featuring G-Dragon & Taeyang)	Let's Talk About Love	Yes	G-Dragon, Seungri	Yes	G-Dragon, Seungri, Kang Uk Jin, Ham Seung-cheon
2016	iKon	"Long Time No See"	Welcome Back	No	–	Yes	Lydia Paek, B.I, Choice37

== Videography ==
=== Music videos ===
Year	Title	Director(s)	Length	Ref.
Korean
2008	"Only Look at Me" (나만 바라봐)	Cha Eun-taek	6:34	
2008	"Prayer" (기도) (featuring Teddy)	Seo Hyun-seung	3:46	
2009	"Where U At"	Seo Hyun-seung	4:27	
2009	"Wedding Dress"	Unknown	4:44	
2010	"You're My / I Need a Girl" (featuring G-Dragon)	Unknown	5:53	
2010	"I'll Be There"	Unknown	3:43	
2013	"Ringa Linga" (링가링가)	Seo Hyun-seung	3:48	
2014	"Eyes, Nose, Lips" (눈, 코, 입)	Han Sa-min	4:35	
2014	"1AM" (새벽한시)	Han Sa-min	3:30	
2017	"White Night (Intro)"	Woogie Kim	1:33	
2017	"Darling"	Woogie Kim	3:54	
2017	"Wake Me Up"	DPR Ian	3:26	
2023	"Vibe" (featuring Jimin)	Roh Sang-yoon (Haus of Team)	2:58	
2023	"Shoong!" (featuring Lisa) (Performance Video)	GIGANT	3:29	
Japanese
2010	"Fall in Love" (with Thelma Aoyama)		4:18	

=== Video album ===
Title	Album details	Peak chart positions		Sales
Title	Album details	JPN		Sales
Title	Album details	DVD	Blu-ray	Sales
SOL 1st 2nd Live Concert Hot & Solar	Released: January 26, 2011; Label: YG Entertainment, Universal Music; Format: DVD, digital download	39	—	—N/a
Real Sound by Taeyang	Released: August 1, 2011; Label: YG Entertainment, Content 7; Format: DVD, digital download	29	—	—N/a
SOL Japan Tour "Rise" 2014	Released: January 28, 2015; Label: YGEX; Format: DVD, Blu-ray, digital download	2	11	—N/a
Taeyang 2017 World Tour White Night in Japan	Released: January 31, 2018; Label: YGEX; Format: DVD, Blu-ray, digital download	2	4	JPN: 10,626
"—" denotes releases that did not chart or were not released in that region.

== See also ==
- Big Bang discography
- GD X Taeyang discography
