= Rise World Tour =

2014–15 concert tour by Taeyang

- Tour by Taeyang
- Location: Asia
- Associated album: Rise
- Start date: August 12, 2014
- End date: March 1, 2015
- Legs: 3
- No. of shows: 25 shows

Taeyang concert chronology
- Solar Concert (2010); Rise World Tour (2014–2015); White Night World Tour (2017)

The Rise World Tour is the first world tour by South Korean singer Taeyang, in support of his second studio album RISE. The tour started on August 12, 2014 in Osaka, Japan and ended on March 1, 2015 in Taiwan.

== Background ==
On May 30, 2014, YG Entertainment announced that Taeyang will kick off his first tour in Japan with four shows in two cities set to commence in mid-August. As soon as the concerts was announced, ticket-reservations for the tour by local fans poured in, resulting in an additional four concerts in three cities. On September 5, 2014, two shows were announced in Seoul, making it Taeyang's first solo concert in his country in four years since 2010. The two concerts in Seoul were sold out in less than ten minutes, and a third show was later added due high demand. In November 2014, nine cities across seven Asian countries were announced as a part of the world tour, including Hong Kong, China, Malaysia, Indonesia, Taiwan, Thailand and Singapore.

== Special guests ==
- G-Dragon (South Korea, Seoul)
- Seungri (Taiwan, Taipei)

== Set list ==
First show in Osaka
1. "Body"
2. "Superstar"
3. "Move"
4. "You're My"
5. "I Need a Girl"
6. "Eyes, Nose, Lips"
7. "Only Look at Me"
8. "Wedding Dress"
9. "This Ain't It"
10. "Ringa Linga"
11. "Break Down"
12. "1AM"
13. "Stay With Me"
14. "Let Go"
15. "Love You to Death"

Encore

1. "Bad Boy"
2. "Fantastic Baby"
3. "Ringa Linga"
4. "1AM"
5. "Eyes, Nose, Lips"
Final show in Taipei
1. "Body"
2. "Superstar"
3. "Move"
4. "You're My"
5. "I Need a Girl"
6. "Eyes Nose Lips"
7. "Only Look at Me"
8. "Wedding Dress"
9. "This Ain't It"
10. "Ringa Linga"
11. "Break Down"
12. "1AM"
13. "Stay With Me"
14. "Good Boy"
15. "Let Go"
16. "Love You to Death"

Encore

1. "Bad Boy"
2. "Fantastic Baby"
3. "Wedding Dress"
4. "Take It Slow
5. "1AM"
6. "Ringa Linga"
7. "Eyes Nose Lips"

== Tour dates ==
List of tour dates
Date	City	Country	Venue	Attendance
August 12, 2014	Osaka	Japan	Osaka International Convention Center	70,000
August 13, 2014	Osaka	Japan	Osaka International Convention Center	70,000
August 17, 2014	Yokohama	Japan	Pacifico Yokohama	70,000
August 18, 2014	Yokohama	Japan	Pacifico Yokohama	70,000
August 20, 2014	Kobe	Japan	Kobe International House	70,000
August 21, 2014	Kobe	Japan	Kobe International House	70,000
August 23, 2014	Fukuoka	Japan	Fukuoka Sunpalace	70,000
August 24, 2014	Fukuoka	Japan	Fukuoka Sunpalace	70,000
August 26, 2014	Hamamatsu	Japan	Hamamatsu Act City	70,000
August 27, 2014	Tokyo	Japan	Tokyo International Forum	70,000
September 1, 2014	Yokohama	Japan	Pacifico Yokohama	70,000
September 3, 2014	Osaka	Japan	Osaka-jō Hall	70,000
September 4, 2014	Osaka	Japan	Osaka-jō Hall	70,000
October 10, 2014	Seoul	South Korea	Olympic Hall	12,000
October 11, 2014	Seoul	South Korea	Olympic Hall	12,000
October 12, 2014	Seoul	South Korea	Olympic Hall	12,000
January 10, 2015	Hong Kong	China	AsiaWorld-Expo Hall 10	4,200
January 24, 2015	Shanghai	China	Shanghai Grand Stage	3,500
January 28, 2015	Guangzhou	China	Guangzhou Gymnasium Hall 2	3,000
January 31, 2015	Beijing	China	Beijing Exhibition Hall	3,000
February 7, 2015	Kuala Lumpur	Malaysia	Stadium Negara	4,200
February 8, 2015	Singapore		Singapore Expo Hall 3	4,200
February 14, 2015	Jakarta	Indonesia	Tennis Indoor Senayan	—
February 21, 2015	Bangkok	Thailand	Thunder Dome	—
March 1, 2015	Taipei	Taiwan	Tpec Gymnasium	—
Total				117,400

== DVD and blu-ray ==
=== SOL Japan Tour "Rise" 2014' ===
SOL Japan Tour "Rise" 2014'

Video by Taeyang
- Released: February 25, 2015
- Recorded: August 27, 2014
- Language: ja
- Label: YGEX

SOL Japan Tour "Rise" 2014' is a live DVD & Blu-ray by Taeyang, released on January 25, 2015 in Japan. The DVD/Blu-ray was filmed during the artist's live performance at Tokyo International Forum, as a part of his first Japan tour which attracted 70,000 fans. The DVD includes a total of the 21 songs that were sung live in the concert, including a photobook, a DVD of Making of SOL JAPAN TOUR "RISE" 2014, Q&A Section, Dance Selection.

==== Track listing ====
No.	Title	Length
1.	"Body""
2.	"Superstar""
3.	"Move""
4.	"You're My""
5.	"I Need A Girl""
6.	"Eyes Nose Lips""
7.	"Only Look at Me""
8.	"Wedding Dress""
9.	"This Ain't It""
10.	"Ringa Linga""
11.	"Break Down""
12.	"1AM""
13.	"Stay With Me""
14.	"Let Go""
15.	"Love You To Death""
16.	"Bad Boy"" (acoustic ver.)
17.	"Fantastic Baby""
18.	"Ringa Linga""
19.	"Body""
20.	"1AM""
21.	"Eyes Nose Lips""

==== Charts ====
Chart (2014)	Peak position
Oricon Music DVD Chart	2
Oricon Music Blu-ray Chart	11
