= White Night World Tour =

2017 concert tour by Taeyang

- Tour by Taeyang
- Associated album: White Night
- Start date: July 8, 2017
- End date: October 29, 2017
- Legs: 3
- No. of shows: 14 in Asia; 9 in North America; 23 in Total

Taeyang concert chronology
- Rise World Tour (2014–15); White Night World Tour (2017); The Light Year Tour (2024 - 25)

The White Night World Tour is the second world tour by South Korean singer Taeyang. The tour began in Japan with four stadium shows and is set to visit 19 cities around the world.

== Background ==
In Asia, it was announced through YGEX that Taeyang will go on a stadium tour in Japan on March 31, with two shows set to be in Chiba Marine Stadium. On April 21, two new shows were announced on Kobe Sports Park Baseball Stadium, with 140,000 fans are expected to come from 4 shows. His labelmates Winner performed as the opening act for the shows in Chiba on July 8 and 9, while Blackpink opened for him for Kobe shows. On July 6, Taeyang announced via his Instagram two shows in Seoul, on August 26 and 27. The rest of Asia leg was announced on August 10, and to visit 8 countries including Philippines, Hong Kong, Thailand, Indonesia, Malaysia, Macau, Singapore, and Taiwan.

On July 4, it was confirmed that the tour will be a full-scale world tour, and would visit 19 cities around the world. The North America shows were announced on July 12, and set to visit 8 cities with 2 stops in Canada and 6 in the United States. On July 28, the concert in Los Angeles was rescheduled from September 13 to 12, and the venue was changed from Hollywood Palladium to The Wiltern. The show in Vancouver was sold out. Due to high demand, a second show was added on September 14.

== Set list ==
First show in Chiba, Japan
1. "Ringa Linga"
2. "Body"
3. "Superstar"
4. "Break Down"
5. "Only Look at Me"
6. "Wedding Dress"
7. "1AM"
8. "You’re My"
9. "I Need a Girl"
10. "So Good" (Lexus Song)
11. "Love You to Death"
12. "Fear" (Mino feat. Taeyang)
13. "Last Dance"
14. "Eyes, Nose, Lips"

Encore

1. "Good Boy"
2. "Stay with Me"
3. "Body"
4. "Bang Bang Bang"
5. "Fantastic Baby"
6. "Eyes, Nose, Lips"
First show in Seoul, South Korea
1. "Ringa Linga"
2. "Body"
3. "Super Star"
4. "Wake Me Up"
5. "Only Look at Me"
6. "Wedding Dress"
7. "Amazin'"
8. "1AM"
9. "Naked"
10. "So Good"
11. "I Need a Girl"
12. "Empty Road"
13. "Ride"
14. "Tonight"
15. "Love You to Death"
16. "Fear"
17. "Last Dance"
18. "Darling"

Encore

1. "Super Star"
2. "Good Boy"
3. "Stay With Me"
4. "Bang Bang Bang"
5. "Fantastic Baby"
6. "Eyes, Nose, Lips"
San Jose, California, United States
1. "Ringa Linga"
2. "Body"
3. "Super Star"
4. "Wake Me Up"
5. "Only Look at Me"
6. "Wedding Dress"
7. "Amazin'"
8. "1AM"
9. "Naked"
10. "So Good"
11. "I Need a Girl"
12. "Empty Road"
13. "Ride"
14. "Tonight"
15. "Love You to Death"
16. "Last Dance"
17. "Darling"

Encore

1. "Break Down"
2. "Good Boy"
3. "Stay With Me"
4. "Bang Bang Bang"
5. "Fantastic Baby"
6. "Eyes, Nose, Lips"

== Tour dates ==
List of tour dates
Date	City	Country	Venue	Attendance
July 8, 2017	Chiba	Japan	Chiba Marine Stadium	140,000
July 9, 2017	Chiba	Japan	Chiba Marine Stadium	140,000
August 5, 2017	Kobe	Japan	Kobe Sports Park Baseball Stadium	140,000
August 6, 2017	Kobe	Japan	Kobe Sports Park Baseball Stadium	140,000
August 26, 2017	Seoul	South Korea	Jamsil Arena	—
August 27, 2017	Seoul	South Korea	Jamsil Arena	—
August 30, 2017	Toronto	Canada	International Centre	—
September 1, 2017	New York City	United States	The Theatre at Madison Square Garden	3,509
September 3, 2017	Chicago	United States	Aragon Ballroom	1,756
September 6, 2017	Atlanta	United States	Cobb Energy Performing Arts Centre	2,000
September 8, 2017	Dallas	United States	The Bomb Factory	2,500
September 10, 2017	San Jose	United States	City National Civic	2,400
September 12, 2017	Los Angeles	United States	The Wiltern	1,850
September 14, 2017	Vancouver	Canada	The Orpheum	—
September 15, 2017	Vancouver	Canada	The Orpheum	—
September 22, 2017	Manila	Philippines	Smart Araneta Coliseum	—
September 24, 2017	Hong Kong	China	AsiaWorld–Expo Hall 10	—
September 30, 2017	Bangkok	Thailand	Impact Challenger Hall 1	—
October 13, 2017	Jakarta	Indonesia	Jakarta International Expo	—
October 15, 2017	Kuala Lumpur	Malaysia	Stadium Negara	5,000
October 21, 2017	Macau	China	Studio City Event Center	—
October 27, 2017	Singapore		The Star Theatre	5,000
October 29, 2017	Taipei	Taiwan	NTSU Arena	5,000
Total				260,000
