= Fxxk It =

Single by Big Bang

from the album Made
- Released: December 13, 2016
- Recorded: 2016
- Genre: Electro hip hop
- Length: 3:52
- Label: YG
- Songwriters: Teddy Park; G-Dragon; T.O.P
- Producers: Teddy Park; G-Dragon; R. Tee

Big Bang singles chronology
| "Let's Not Fall in Love" (2015) | "Fxxk It" (2016) | "Last Dance" (2016) |

Music video
- "Fxxk It" on YouTube

"Fxxk It" (Korean: 에라 모르겠다; RR: Era moreugettda; lit. 'Eh I don't know') is a song recorded by South Korean boy band Big Bang. The group's first single in over a year, "Fxxk It" was released alongside "Last Dance" on December 13, 2016, in conjunction with the group's third Korean-language studio album Made through YG Entertainment. It was written by long-time group collaborator Teddy Park with group members G-Dragon and T.O.P, with production handled by the first two contributors along with R. Tee.

Musically, "Fxxk It" is an electronic hip-hop track that blends instrumentations of horns, synths, and tropical beats. The song's lyrical content revolves around the notion of letting go of ones worries. It was subject to positive reviews from music critics; The Star highlighted its "playful persona and eclectic artistry" while Dazed was favorable towards its easy-going production and the members' vocal delivery.

The song was a commercial success—it topped the Gaon Digital Chart for three consecutive weeks and sold more than 2,500,000 digital units in South Korea. Elsewhere, it peaked within the top ten on the Japan Hot 100 and entered the Canadian Hot 100 at number 98. BigBang promoted the song with live performances on the music program Inkigayo throughout the month following its release. It was also included on the set lists of their ongoing 10th anniversary 0.TO.10 concert tour and Big Bang Special Event fan meeting in Japan and South Korea.

== Background and release ==
On December 6, the name of the single was revealed with a promotional poster. The song was released on December 13 at midnight KST worldwide on iTunes. Upon its release, national public broadcaster KBS banned the song from being permitted to air. According to their announcement, KBS' music review panel had flagged it as inappropriate for broadcast due to its lyrics, particularly with the world "yangachi," which translates to "thug" or "scumbag". In response, however, YG Entertainment said "We will not be reviewing the song," stating that they would not be changing the lyrics to be more broadcast-friendly.

== Music and lyrics ==
In the music video for "Fxxk It", the members engage in various "immature" activities such as riding a tandem bicycle through a commercial area.

"Fxxk It" was written by YG Entertainment producer Teddy Park alongside BigBang members G-Dragon and T.O.P, whilst production was handled by the first two contributors alongside R. Tee. The members have said that the song came out "when we didn't know what to do and were just sighing", and wanted to express the feeling of immaturity in it. The song's production was noted for being "futuristic", including a "amalgamation of tropical beats, horns and synths". Tamar Herman of Billboard described it as "quirky mid-tempo" that "pulls heavily on Big Bang’s international appeal and begins with Taeyang’s English-language lovelorn verse. The song quickly morphs into an electronic hip-hop track that blends an eclectic mix of horns, synths, and tropical beats, recalling the subtle chaos of last year’s 'Bae Bae.'" Fuse said that the song mirrors one the album's previous singles, "Bae Bae,": "the guys deliver bouncy, electro-hip-hop, detailing relationship nerves until finally deciding 'Fxxk it, I just wanna get down.'" Chester Chin from The Star said that "it sets the perfect tone by being one of the BigBang-est song there is. The quirky mid-tempo hip-hop number underlines the boys’ playful persona and eclectic artistry.

== Critical reception ==
"Fxxk It" received mostly positive reviews from music critics. Writing for Billboard, Tamar Herman ranked the track number seven in the magazine's list of ten best BigBang songs, saying that it "incorporates the best of the quintet: strong vocals, dramatic raps, and quirky beats". Alan Gibbens from Gig Soup Music was favorable towards the track's upbeat and enjoyable character, and said that "the chorus is catchy and bouncy, with a general tone of letting go of ones worries." Jeff Benjamin for Fuse described the song as "career-exemplifying" and wrote that it "highlights the group's always-forward-thinking production along with their signature style of mixing heartfelt with tongue-in-cheek lyrics". Benjamin concluded by complimenting "how comfortable the guys sound on the track, particularly as Taeyang nails the all-English opening, further proving their international appeal".

Jon Caramanica from The New York Times was favorable towards the song, where he highlighted its more laid-back production and the members' vocal delivery. In The Star, Chester Chin called the track a "futuristic top-notched" offering, capturing the group's "playful persona and eclectic artistry". Dazed ranked it one of the best K-pop songs of 2016, highlighting the group's "undeniable maturity", stating that "everything here flows, no one element is too heavy-handed". The publication additionally added that "as a final single for some time due to military service, it’s a definite high to go out on". Apple Music additionally listed it as one of the best songs of the week.

== Awards ==
Due to is success on digital platforms, "Fxxk It" received the Song of the Year – December award at the 6th Gaon Chart Music Awards and was one of the eleven songs to receive the Digital Bonsang prize at the 32nd Golden Disc Awards. The song additionally achieved the top spot on the music programs M Countdown, Inkigayo, and Music Bank, and received four consecutive weekly Melon Popularity Awards.

Awards for "Fxxk It"
| Year | Award | Category | Result | Ref. |
|---|---|---|---|---|
| 2017 | Gaon Chart Music Awards | Song of the Year – December | Won | |
| 2017 | Melon Music Awards | Best Song Award | Nominated | |
| 2018 | Golden Disc Awards | Digital Bonsang | Won | |
| 2018 | Golden Disc Awards | Digital Daesang | Nominated | |

Music program awards (8 total)
| Program | Date | Ref. |
|---|---|---|
| M Countdown | December 22, 2016 | |
| M Countdown | January 5, 2017 | |
| M Countdown | January 12, 2017 | |
| Inkigayo | December 25, 2016 | |
| Inkigayo | January 1, 2017 | |
| Inkigayo | January 8, 2017 | |
| Music Bank | January 13, 2017 | |
| Music Bank | January 20, 2017 | |

== Commercial performance ==
"Fxxk It" was commercially successful in South Korea. It debuted at number one on the Gaon Digital Chart in the week of December 11–17, 2016, where it recorded the second highest weekly sales of the year after Lim Chang-jung's "The Love That I Committed" in September, selling 325,623 digital copies in five days. The single also debuted at the top position on the component streaming chart during the same week, with over seven million audio streams. The song remained atop the digital ranking in the next two chart issues with a total of three weeks at number one, selling another 273,875 digital units in the country. It topped both the December 2016 monthly digital and download rankings, with nearly 600,000 digital units sold in three weeks since being made available. During the course of the following year, the song garnered an additional 1,178,534 digital downloads, ranking at number 35 on the component download chart for 2017. It was the 25th most streamed track of the year with more than 81.8 million audio streams, raising the cumulative streaming figures for the song to 103 million. "Fxxk It" was ranked the 35th best-performing single overall in the country on the 2017 year-end digital chart.

In Japan, the song debuted and peaked at number seven on the Japan Hot 100 in the chart issue dated December 21, 2016. It charted for an additional five weeks on the Japanese Billboard chart. "Fxxk It" also entered the Canadian Hot 100 at number 98 in the chart issue dated January 7, 2017, the first song of the group to appear on the chart. In the United States, the song charted second on the US World Digital Song Sales, becoming their eighth top-two single on the chart; it further remained on the chart for an additional nine weeks. In its year-end ranking for 2017, "Fxxk It" was listed as the 15th most downloaded foreign-language/international song in the US. In Finland, the single peaked at number 23 on the national download chart, becoming BigBang's highest-charting single. It additionally entered the New Zealand Heatseekers singles chart at number 7.

== Music video and promotion ==
The music video was filmed in Cheongju, on October 18, 2016. It was directed by Seo Hyun-seung, who previously directed "Fantastic Baby" (2012) and "Bang Bang Bang" (2015). "Fxxk It" was chosen by Stereogum as the best music video of the week, with critic Tom Breihan saying that "South Korea’s greatest boy band have mastered the visual panache of the mid'-90s alt-rock/bubblegrunge video, and none of us are safe."

== Charts ==
=== Weekly charts ===
Weekly chart performance for "Fxxk It"
| Chart (2016) | Peak position |
|---|---|
| Canada Hot 100 (Billboard) | 98 |
| Finland Download (Latauslista) | 23 |
| Japan (Japan Hot 100) | 7 |
| New Zealand Heatseekers (RMNZ) | 7 |
| South Korea (Gaon) | 1 |
| US World Digital Songs (Billboard) | 2 |

=== Monthly charts ===
Monthly chart performance for "Fxxk It"
| Chart (2016) | Peak position |
|---|---|
| South Korea (Gaon) | 1 |

=== Year-end charts ===
Year-end chart performance for "Fxxk It"
| Chart (2017) | Position |
|---|---|
| South Korea (Gaon) | 35 |
| US World Digital Songs (Billboard) | 15 |

== Release history ==
Release history and formats for "Fxxk It"
| Region | Date | Format | Label | Ref. |
|---|---|---|---|---|
| Various | December 13, 2016 | Digital download; streaming | YG Entertainment | |
