= D'slove Tour =

2014–15 concert tour by Daesung

- Tour by Daesung
- Location: Japan
- Associated album: D'slove
- Start date: June 11, 2014
- End date: July 27, 2014
- Legs: 2
- No. of shows: 21 shows

Daesung concert chronology
- D'scover Tour (2013); D'slove Tour (2014–2015); D-lite Japan Dome Tour (2017)

D'slove Tour is the second Japanese tour by South Korean singer Daesung, member of Big Bang. It was attended by over 170,000 people, making it the highest attendance in a Japanese national tour held by a Korean soloist at the time. This tour also made Daesung the first Korean soloist to gather over 100,000 fans in Japan for two consecutive years.

== History ==
In early 2014, YG Entertainment announced that Daesung will embark on a second Japan tour, and announced a total of 12 shows across 7 cities. More than 200,000 people applied for the tickets, which resulted in an additional performance at Nippon Budoukan and two additional shows at Osaka-jo Hall. He was expected to be joined by 138,000 fans. The tour officially commenced with two shows at Yokohama Arena which was attended by 34,000 fans.

After successfully completing his solo arena tour "D’slove", gathering 170,000 fans from 15 concerts in eight cities, Daesung launched the encore concert in Yoyogi National Gymnasium and Osaka Jo Hall. Japanese singer Linda Yamamoto made a special appearance.

== Special guests ==
- Linda Yamamoto

== Set list ==
1. Sunny Hill
2. Powerful Boy
3. I Love You
4. Love
5. Rainy Rainy
6. Awake, Asleep
7. Old Diary
8. Mr. Children
9. Wings
10. Missing You Now
11. Try Smiling
12. The Flower Bud Of My Dream
13. Baby Don’t Cry
14. Joyful
15. Hello

Encore

1. Look at Me, Gwisoon
2. Fantastic Baby
3. Powerful Boy
4. Wings
5. Singer's Ballad

== Tour dates ==
Date	City	Country	Venue	Attendance
D'slove 2014 in Japan
June 11, 2014	Yokohama	Japan	Yokohama Arena	170,000
June 12, 2014	Yokohama	Japan	Yokohama Arena	170,000
June 19, 2014	Kobe	Japan	World Memorial Hall	170,000
June 21, 2014	Kobe	Japan	World Memorial Hall	170,000
June 22, 2014	Kobe	Japan	World Memorial Hall	170,000
June 24, 2014	Fukuoka	Japan	Fukuoka Convention Center	170,000
June 26, 2014	Osaka	Japan	Osaka Castle Hall	170,000
June 27, 2014	Osaka	Japan	Osaka Castle Hall	170,000
June 28, 2014	Sendai	Japan	Xebio Arena	170,000
June 29, 2014	Sendai	Japan	Xebio Arena	170,000
July 5, 2014	Sapporo	Japan	Hokkaido Prefectural Sports Center	170,000
July 12, 2014	Nagoya	Japan	Nippon Gaishi Hall	170,000
July 13, 2014	Nagoya	Japan	Nippon Gaishi Hall	170,000
July 17, 2014	Tokyo	Japan	Nippon Budokan	170,000
July 18, 2014	Tokyo	Japan	Nippon Budokan	170,000
July 26, 2014	Osaka	Japan	Osaka-jō Hall	170,000
July 27, 2014	Osaka	Japan	Osaka-jō Hall	170,000
Encore!! 3D Tour [D-Lite DLive D’slove]
January 31, 2015	Tokyo	Japan	Yoyogi National Stadium	26,000
February 1, 2015	Tokyo	Japan	Yoyogi National Stadium	26,000
February 10, 2015	Osaka	Japan	Osaka Jo Hall	—
February 11, 2015	Osaka	Japan	Osaka Jo Hall	—
Total				196,000
