= Shoong! =

2023 song by Taeyang featuring Lisa

- Promotional graphic

Song by Taeyang featuring Lisa

from the EP Down to Earth
- Language: Korean; English
- Released: April 25, 2023
- Recorded: 2023
- Studio: The Black Label (Seoul)
- Genre: R&B; trap; hip-hop
- Length: 3:25
- Label: The Black Label; Interscope
- Composers: Kush; Vince; Dominsuk; Bekuh Boom
- Lyricists: Taeyang; Kush; Vince; Bekuh Boom

Performance video
- "Shoong!" on YouTube

"Shoong!" (Korean: 슝!; RR: Syung!) is a song by South Korean singer Taeyang featuring Thai rapper Lisa of Blackpink. It was released through The Black Label on April 25, 2023, as the second track on Taeyang's second extended play Down to Earth (2023).

A performance video for "Shoong!" with the two artists performing choreography together was released on The Black Label's YouTube channel simultaneously with the EP's release. The song reached the top ten in Hungary and Singapore and the top 15 in Malaysia, Taiwan, and the US Billboard World Digital Song Sales chart.

== Background ==
On December 26, 2022, it was announced that BigBang member Taeyang had left his longtime agency YG Entertainment and signed a new contract with YG Entertainment's subsidiary The Black Label. In January 2023, media outlets reported that Taeyang would be making a comeback with a pre-release single from his upcoming album. The single, "Vibe", featuring BTS member Jimin, was officially released on January 13. This marked the singer's first release in over five years since White Night (2017). On March 28, The Black Label confirmed that Taeyang was currently preparing an album to be released in April. On April 12, it was announced through Osen that Blackpink member Lisa would feature on a track on the album and appear in its music video as well. This marked Lisa's first release in over a year since her DJ Snake collaboration "SG" (2021). It is also the artists' second time working together, after Lisa appeared as a backup dancer in the music video for Taeyang's 2013 single "Ringa Linga". On April 13, Taeyang's album was officially announced to be an extended play entitled Down to Earth with a release date of April 25. The collaboration with Lisa was revealed as "Shoong!" on April 19 with a teaser poster of the performance video. On April 22, a teaser video for the performance video was released. On April 23, the artist dropped a tracklist poster which detailed the credits of the song. "Shoong!" was released for digital download and streaming as the second track of Down to Earth on April 25, 2023, by The Black Label.

== Production ==
"Shoong!" was written by Taeyang, Kush, Vince, and Bekuh Boom and composed by the latter three alongside Dominsuk. It is described as an R&B and trap song with "addictive melodies and trendy hip-hop beats." The song's title "Shoong!" is an onomatopoeia used for cars passing by in Korean, which inspired the racing concept of the video.

In an interview with Rolling Stone, Taeyang explained how following his discharge from military service, he felt lost about the direction to take his music. The Black Label's producers brought him "Shoong!", and the song came to fruition when they created a melody together by throwing out words and lyrics jokingly. From the track, Taeyang realized his vision for the rest of the album. The collaboration with Lisa happened very quickly, with the Blackpink rapper agreeing right away to be part of the project. The song's arrangement and producing was finished in under a month, with the initial intention of making it the lead single of the album.

== Performance video ==
A scene in the performance video of Taeyang and Lisa dancing together.

An accompanying performance video for the song was uploaded to The Black Label's official YouTube channel in conjunction with the release of the extended play. It was preceded by a 17-second long teaser released two days earlier on April 23. In the video, Taeyang and Lisa perform the song’s choreography on a futuristic set with pink and orange neon lights. The choreography for the song was done by Bailey Sok, who also did "Vibe." Upon release, the performance video topped YouTube's trending worldwide chart and exceeded 10 million views in 15 hours, more than doubling the views achieved by the album's title track "Seed."

== Live performances ==
On April 30, Taeyang performed "Shoong!" for the first time live on SBS's Inkigayo alongside the title track "Seed."

== Credits and personnel ==
- Taeyang – lead vocals, lyricist
- Lisa – featured vocals
- Kush – lyricist, composer
- Vince – lyricist, composer, synthesizer
- Bekuh Boom – lyricist, composer
- Dominsuk – composer, arranger, drums
- 24 – arranger, keyboard
- R. Tee – arranger, keyboard

== Charts ==
=== Weekly charts ===
Weekly chart performance for "Shoong!"
Chart (2023)	Peak position
Global 200 (Billboard)	143
Hong Kong (Billboard)	24
Hungary (Single Top 40)	9
Malaysia (Billboard)	11
New Zealand Hot Singles (RMNZ)	31
Singapore (RIAS)	9
South Korea (Circle)	119
Taiwan (Billboard)	13
UK Singles Downloads (Official Charts)	40
UK Singles Sales (OCC)	75
US World Digital Song Sales (Billboard)	11
Vietnam (Vietnam Hot 100)	35

=== Monthly charts ===
Monthly chart performance for "Shoong!"
Chart (2023)	Position
South Korea (Circle)	144

== Certifications ==
Certifications for "Shoong!"
Region	Certification	Certified units/sales
Brazil (Pro-Música Brasil)	Gold	20,000^{‡}
^{‡} Sales+streaming figures based on certification alone.
