= Last Dance (BigBang song) =

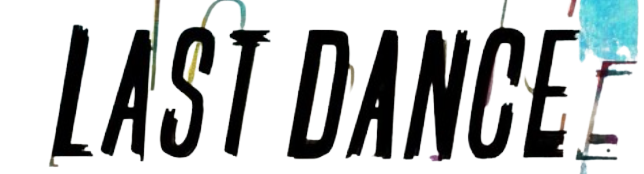

Single by BigBang

from the album Made
- Released: December 13, 2016
- Genre: R&B; pop rock; ballad
- Length: 4:40
- Label: YG
- Songwriters: G-Dragon, T.O.P, Taeyang
- Producers: G-Dragon, Jeon Yong Jun

BigBang singles chronology
"Fxxk It" (2016)	"Last Dance" (2016)	"Flower Road" (2018)

"Last Dance" is a song recorded by South Korean boy band BigBang. It was released on December 13, 2016, through YG Entertainment, as the sixth single for the group's third Korean-language studio album Made (2016). It was written by group members G-Dragon, T.O.P, and Taeyang and produced by G-Dragon and Jeon Yong Jun. Commercially, "Last Dance" peaked at number two on the Gaon Digital Chart and reached the Top 10 on the Billboard Japan Hot 100.

== Background and composition ==
The music video was filmed in Seoul on October 15, 2016. On December 7, the name of the single was revealed alongside its promotional poster. The song was released on December 13 at midnight KST worldwide on iTunes, with the accompanying music video directed by Han Sa Min.

"Last Dance" was written by BigBang members G-Dragon, T.O.P and, Taeyang with the production being done by G-Dragon and Jeon Yong Jun, and the arrangement made by Seo Won Jin and 24. The song is a slow R&B and pop-rock ballad. The lyrics express BigBang's memories of the past 10 years and members' connection with their fans. G-Dragon talked about creating the song and "wanted the members to sing "Last Dance" as if they were talking, and really mean what they were singing. I wanted a lot of emotion in it".

== Commercial performance ==
Upon its release, "Last Dance" debuted at number two in four charts of China's QQ Music: the daily, popularity index, music video, and K-pop's music video charts, only behind the group's other single released on the same day, "Fxxk It". In three days, the song sold 335,813 copies and the music video surpassed 1.6 million views on QQ Music.

In South Korea, "Last Dance" placed second on the Digital and Download charts also behind "Fxxk It", with 281,843 downloads sold in five days. The single peaked at number three on the Gaon Streaming Chart with over 5.3 million streams.

== Critical reception ==
Tamar Herman of Billboard described the track as an "evocative pop-rock ballad that serves as an ode to the band's time together, with the members promising to return to the fans after their mandatory military service. Herman also highlighted that the "poignant rap from T.O.P at the song's climax" which was "accompanied by a sample of cheering fans" was a way of incorporating BigBang's fans "into their farewell for the foreseeable future." Jeff Benjamin of Fuse complimented the "powerful, pop production and subject matter" that gave "Last Dance" an "emotional punch". Benjamin also felt that the single "reads like a love letter", demonstrating the close connection between BigBang and their fans. In a review of the album, KKBOX wrote that the anxious menssage of the single felt "realistic", allowing the listeners to feel "fascinated" and "moved" while listening.

== Accolades ==
"Last Dance" won a first place music program award on Music Bank on December 23, 2016. It received a nomination for Song of the Year (December) at the 6th Gaon Chart Music Awards.

== Chart performance ==
=== Weekly charts ===
Weekly chart performance for "Last Dance"
Chart (2016)	Peak position
Japan (Japan Hot 100)	9
South Korea (Gaon)	2
US World Digital Songs (Billboard)	3

=== Year-end charts ===
Year-end chart performance for "Last Dance"
Chart (2025)	Position
South Korea (Circle)	127

== Sales ==
Sales for "Last Dance"
Chart	Sales
South Korea (Gaon)	1,200,967

== Release history ==
Release history and formats for "Last Dance"
Region	Date	Format	Label
Various	December 13, 2016	Digital download	YG Entertainment
