= D'scover Tour =

2013 concert tour by Daesung

D'scover Tour 2013 in Japan
- Tour by Daesung
- Location: Japan
- Associated album: D'scover
- Start date: March 24, 2013
- End date: June 18, 2013
- No. of shows: 25 shows

Daesung concert chronology
- D'scover Tour (2013); D'slove Tour (2014-15)

D'scover Tour is the debut concert tour and first Japanese tour by South Korean singer Daesung, member of Big Bang. The tour was directed by Daesung himself. It was originally planned as a concert series in Kobe and Tokyo, but after high demand for tickets, a national tour was announced. In total, 300,000 fans applied for the 102,000 additional tickets that were put to sale. All concerts were sold out.

== History ==
In December 2012, it was announced that Daesung would hold a total of four concerts at Kobe and Tokyo to promote his new album D'scover. However, on February 28, 2013, it was announced that due to high demand, he would be holding an additional 21 concerts over 17 cities, bringing the total to 25 concerts over 18 cities. The concert tour began on March 23 at Kobe's World Memorial Hall and ended on June 18 at Kanagawa's Yokohama Arena.

== Set list ==
1. Singer's Ballad
2. Love
3. Sunny Hill
4. Powerful Boy
5. Wings
6. Like Overflowing with Kindness
7. Missing You Now
8. The Flower Bud Of My Dream
9. Try Smiling
10. Map Of The Future II
11. Mr. Children
12. Konayuki
13. Baby Don’t Cry
14. Joyful
15. Sobakasu

Encore

1. Look at Me, Gwisoon
2. Joyful
3. Wings

== Tour dates ==
Date	City	Country	Venue	Attendance
March 24, 2013	Kobe	Japan	World Memorial Hall	24,000
March 25, 2013	Kobe	Japan	World Memorial Hall	24,000
March 30, 2013	Tokyo	Japan	Nippon Budokan	24,000
March 31, 2013	Tokyo	Japan	Nippon Budokan	24,000
May 1, 2013	Ichikawa	Japan	Ichikawa City Cultural Hall	100,000
May 2, 2013	Ichikawa	Japan	Ichikawa City Cultural Hall	100,000
May 4, 2013	Chūō-ku	Japan	Niigata Prefectural Civic Center	100,000
May 6, 2013	Aomori	Japan	Aomori City Cultural Hall	100,000
May 8, 2013	Sapporo	Japan	Nitori Culture Hall	100,000
May 12, 2013	Miyagino-ku	Japan	Sendai Sun Plaza Hall	100,000
May 14, 2013	Saitama	Japan	Omiya Sonic City	100,000
May 16, 2013	Tokyo	Japan	Fuchu Forest Art Theater	100,000
May 18, 2013	Nagoya	Japan	Aichi Prefectural Art The	100,000
May 19, 2013	Nagoya	Japan	Aichi Prefectural Art The	100,000
May 23, 2013	Kobe	Japan	Kobe International Exhibition Hall	100,000
May 24, 2013	Takamatsu	Japan	Alpha Anabuki Hall	100,000
May 26, 2013	Kurashiki	Japan	Kurashiki Bikan	100,000
May 27, 2013	Hiroshima	Japan	Hiroshima Bunka Gakuen HBG Hall	100,000
June 4, 2013	Nagasaki	Japan	Nagasaki Brick Hall	100,000
June 6, 2013	Fukuoka	Japan	Fukuoka Sun Palace Hotel & Hall	100,000
June 7, 2013	Fukuoka	Japan	Fukuoka Sun Palace Hotel & Hall	100,000
June 13, 2013	Shiga	Japan	Biwako Hall	100,000
June 15, 2013	Osaka	Japan	Grand Cube Osaka	100,000
June 16, 2013	Osaka	Japan	Grand Cube Osaka	100,000
June 18, 2013	Yokohama	Japan	Yokohama Arena	100,000
Total				124,000
