= Solar (Taeyang album) =

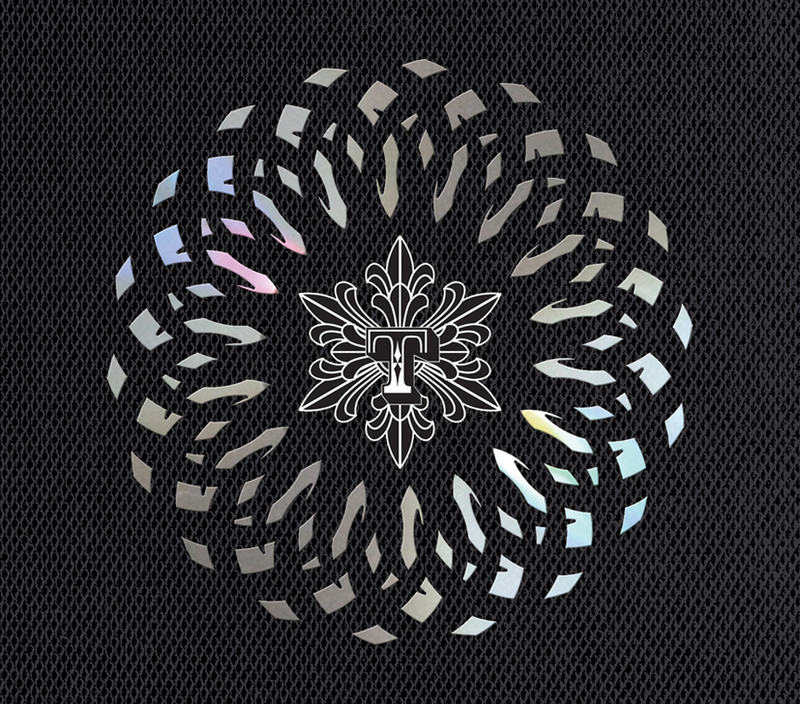
- Digital/regular cover

Studio album by Taeyang
- Released: July 1, 2010
- Recorded: 2009–2010
- Genre: R&B; hip hop; pop
- Length: 38:04; 45:52 (Deluxe edition); 41:48 (International edition)
- Label: YG
- Producer: Teddy Park; Choice37; Kush; Jeon Goon

Taeyang chronology
Hot (2008)	Solar (2010)	Rise (2014)

Singles from Solar
- 1. "Where U At" Released: October 14, 2009; 2. "Wedding Dress" Released: November 13, 2009; 3. "I Need a Girl" Released: July 1, 2010; 4. "I'll Be There" Released: August 23, 2010

Solar International cover
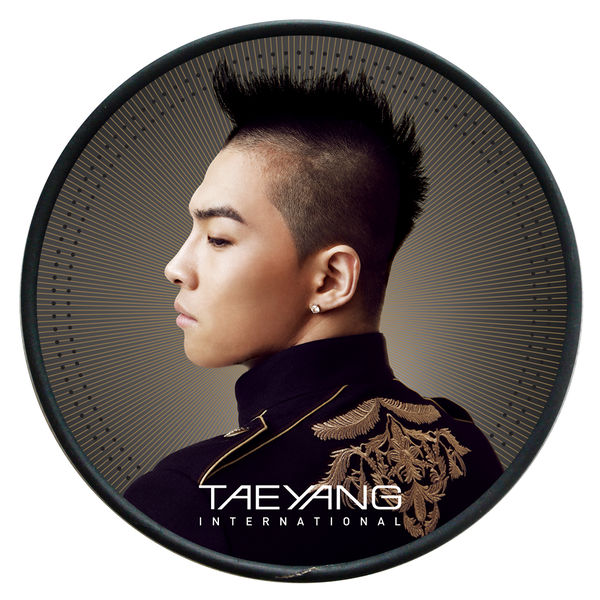

Solar is the first studio album by South Korean recording artist Taeyang, a member of the boy group Big Bang. It was released via YG Entertainment on July 1, 2010, and was distributed in three formats—a regular edition, a deluxe edition (which was limited to 30,000 copies worldwide) and was made available for digital consumption. Four singles were spawned from the album: "Where U At", "Wedding Dress" and "I Need a Girl" (featuring bandmate G-Dragon) and "I'll Be There".

The international edition of the album, titled Solar International, was the first K-pop release to be sold worldwide on iTunes with both an audio and video album. The audio version (complete with a digital booklet) was made available on iTunes on August 19, 2010, while the video version (bundled with bonus behind the scenes documentaries) was released on September 10.

== Singles ==
"Where U At" (featuring Teddy Park) was the first promotional single of the album. It was released on October 14, 2009. The music video shows Taeyang dancing with two back up dancers (choreographers), Lyle Beniga and Shaun Evaristo, in an alleyway. Teddy Park's rap shows him wearing a leather coat, while tossing an apple in one hand, on a motorbike. Taeyang wears black with the dancers and then changes to white at the dance break. In the end of the video, the dancers walk away and Taeyang walks down an alleyway looking back at a girl ("Wedding Dress" prequel).

"Wedding Dress", an R&B song, was released in November 2009, just a month after the release of "Where U At", making it the second promotional single of the album.

"I Need a Girl" (featuring G-Dragon) was released in conjunction with Solar on July 1, 2010. An R&B track, its lyrical content consists of Taeyang expressing the type of woman he wants. Both the music video and dance version video features labelmate Sandara Park as Taeyang's love interest and includes appearances by G-Dragon.

"I'll Be There" was released on August 23, 2010, and served as the second single from the album. The music video released for the track pays homage to "Thriller" by Michael Jackson, set against the backdrop of a graveyard and haunted mansion with a "lifeless, jerky choreography."

== Accolades ==
Music program awards
Song	Program	Date	Ref.
"I Need a Girl"	Inkigayo (SBS)	July 18, 2010	
"I Need a Girl"	Inkigayo (SBS)	July 25, 2010	
"I Need a Girl"	M Countdown (Mnet)	July 8, 2010	
"I Need a Girl"	M Countdown (Mnet)	July 15, 2010	
"I Need a Girl"	Music Bank (KBS)	July 16, 2010	
"I'll Be There"	M Countdown (Mnet)	September 2, 2010	

== Track listing ==
Standard edition
No.	Title	Lyrics	Music	Arrangement	Length
1.	"Solar" (Intro)	Choice 37	Choice 37, Taeyang	Choice 37	1:01
2.	"Superstar"	Teddy	Teddy	Teddy	3:11
3.	"I Need a Girl" (featuring G-Dragon)	Jeon Goon, G-Dragon	Jeon Goon	Jeon Goon	3:40
4.	"Just a Feeling"	Teddy	Teddy, Taeyang	Teddy	3:36
5.	"You're My"	Jeon Goon, Choi Gap-Won	Jeon Goon	Jeon Goon	2:48
6.	"Move" (featuring Teddy)	Kush, Teddy	Teddy, Kush	Kush	4:03
7.	"Break Down"	Teddy	Teddy	Teddy	4:02
8.	"After You Fall Asleep" (featuring Swings) (니가 잠든 후에; Neegah Jamdeun Hue)	G-Dragon, Swings	G-Dragon, Choice 37	Choice 37	3:46
9.	"Where U At"	Teddy	Teddy, Taeyang	Teddy	3:48
10.	"Wedding Dress"	Teddy	Teddy, Taeyang	Teddy	4:01
11.	"Take It Slow"	Taeyang	Taeyang, cat@lyst	cat@lyst	4:08
Total length:					38:04

Deluxe edition
No.	Title	Length
1.	"Solar" (Intro)	1:01
2.	"Superstar"	3:11
3.	"I Need a Girl" (featuring G-Dragon)	3:40
4.	"Just a Feeling"	3:36
5.	"You're My"	2:48
6.	"Move" (featuring Teddy)	4:03
7.	"Break Down"	4:02
8.	"After You Fall Asleep" (featuring Swings) (니가 잠든 후에; Niga Jamdeun Hue)	3:46
9.	"Where U At"	3:48
10.	"Wedding Dress"	4:01
11.	"Prayer" (featuring Teddy) (기도; Gido)	3:37
12.	"Only Look at Me" (나만 바라봐; Naman Barabwa)	3:55
13.	"Take It Slow"	4:08
Total length:		45:52

Taiwan special edition
No.	Title	Length
1.	"Solar" (Intro)	1:01
2.	"Superstar"	3:11
3.	"I Need a Girl" (featuring G-Dragon)	3:40
4.	"Just a Feeling"	3:36
5.	"You're My"	2:48
6.	"Move" (featuring Teddy)	4:03
7.	"Break Down"	4:02
8.	"After You Fall Asleep" (featuring Swings) (니가 잠든 후에; Niga Jamdeun Hue)	3:46
9.	"Where U At"	3:48
10.	"Wedding Dress"	4:01
11.	"Take It Slow"	4:08
12.	"Only Look at Me" (나만 바라봐; Naman Barabwa)	3:55
13.	"Prayer" (featuring Teddy) (기도; Gido)	3:37
14.	"Baby I'm Sorry"	4:06
Total length:		45:52

Taiwan special edition (DVD)
No.	Title	Length
1.	"Only Look at Me" (music video, Chinese subtitles)
2.	"Wedding Dress" (music video, Chinese subtitles)
3.	"Where U At" (music video, Chinese subtitles)
4.	"Prayer" (featuring Teddy, music video, Chinese subtitles)
5.	"I Need a Girl" (featuring G-Dragon, music video, Chinese subtitles)
6.	"Only Look at Me" (Solar live version, Chinese subtitles)
7.	"Prayer" (featuring Teddy, music video making, Chinese subtitles)
8.	"Where U At" (music video making, Chinese subtitles)
9.	"I Need a Girl" (featuring G-Dragon, music video making, Chinese subtitles)

International edition
No.	Title	Length
1.	"Solar" (Intro)	0:57
2.	"Superstar"	3:14
3.	"Prayer" (featuring Teddy) (기도; Gido)	3:41
4.	"I'll Be There" (English version)	3:19
5.	"Wedding Dress" (English version)	4:07
6.	"Connection" (featuring Big Tone, English version)	3:31
7.	"Move" (featuring Teddy)	3:53
8.	"Where U At"	3:49
9.	"I Need a Girl" (featuring G-Dragon)	3:40
10.	"Only Look at Me" (나만 바라봐; Naman Barabwa)	4:00
11.	"Take It Slow"	4:22
12.	"I'll Be There" (Korean version)	3:15
Total length:		41:48

DVD
No.	Title	Length
1.	"Prayer" (featuring Teddy, music video)
2.	"Only Look at Me" (Music video)
3.	"Where U At" (Music video)
4.	"Wedding Dress" (Music video)
5.	"I Need a Girl" (featuring G-Dragon, music video)
6.	"I'll Be There" (Korean version, music video)
7.	"I'll Be There" (English version, music video)
8.	"Making Film 1"
9.	"Making Film 2"

== Charts ==
=== Weekly charts ===
Chart (2010)	Peak position
South Korean Albums (Gaon)	1
US World Albums (Billboard)	14

=== Monthly charts ===
Chart (2010)	Peak position
South Korean Albums (Gaon)	3

=== Year-end charts ===
Chart (2010)	Position
South Korean Albums (Gaon)	39

== Sales ==
Sales for Solar
Region	Sales amount
South Korea	36,444
South Korea (deluxe)	26,979
South Korea (int'l edition)	21,182

== Release history ==
Country	Date	Format	Label
South Korea	July 1, 2010	Digital download, CD	YG Entertainment, Mnet Media
Various	July 1, 2010	Digital download	YG Entertainment, Mnet Media
Various	August 19, 2010	Digital download, CD (International edition)	YG Entertainment, Mnet Media
Taiwan	December 13, 2013	Digital download, CD+DVD (Taiwan Special edition)	Warner Music Taiwan
