= Soribada =

Korean peer-to-peer file-sharing service

Soribada, Inc.
- Trade name: Soribada.com, Inc.
- Native name: 주식회사 소리바다
- Romanized name: Jusikhoesa Soribada
- Type: public company
- Traded as: KRX: 053110
- Industry: peer-to-peer system
- Genre: K-pop
- Founded: Seoul, South Korea (October 5, 2001)
- Founder: Yang Jung-hwan (Sean Yang)
- Headquarters: Seoul, South Korea
- Area served: South Korea
- Key people: Yang Jung-hwan (Founder); Son Ji-hyun (CEO)
- Owner: ISPC International Limited (10.25%); Yang Jung-hwan and Yang Il-hwan (7.94%)
- Subsidiaries: CCM Sky; DePassion Co., Ltd. Soribada Education; Soribada Games; Will Entertainment; Will Investment
- Website: soribada.com

Soribada (Korean: 소리바다) was the first Korean peer-to-peer file-sharing service, launched in 2000 by Sean Yang. The name 'Soribada' means "Ocean of Sound" or "Receiving (downloading) Sound". It was closed in 2002 by court order but continued to be distributed with a stipulation that its users were responsible for any of the files downloaded. On November 5, 2003, Soribada was relaunched as and in July 2004, the website was renewed as a P2P search portal with a paid MP3 service in December 2004.

It remains the most widely used P2P system in Korea. The most recent version of Soribada is Soribada 6, which is downloadable on their website.

In 2017, the site held their first Soribada Best K-Music Awards, after 17 years since the site's launch.

== Charges of 2002 ==
Soribada was indicted on copyright infringement charges for the first time. The case was filed by the Korean Association of Phonographic Producers (KAPP), presently the Recording Industry Association of Korea (RIAK).

== Soribada 2.0 ==
Soribada 2.0 allowed users to swap files without having to establish a link to a centralized server. This mechanism was put in place in order to minimize the risk of legal prosecution. However, KAPP's reply to this solution was that every Soribada 2.0-user was sued instead of the developers. Yang Jung-hwan responded to KAPP's approach by saying, “In a situation where voluminous e-mail services handling over 100MB are being sustained, netizens will find other ways to share music files even with Soribada out of the market.”

== Paid service ==
From December 2004 to June 2005, Soribada sold nearly 5 million songs through its servers. Searches returned both tracks for sale and free downloads, with the first ones appearing higher on search results.

== Service stopped: September 2005 ==
Upon being sued again, this time by 30 record labels (led by YBM Seoul Records (now Kakao Entertainment) and JYP Entertainment) and some musicians, Soribada stopped its service in 2005. Yang Jung-hwan and his brother Il-hwan, the creators of Soribada, faced criminal charges in January 2005. A complete shutdown of Soribada has been ordered by the Seoul High Court in October 2007 after it overturned a lower court decision in favor of the former. The High Court's basis for the reversal was the substantial evidences and findings submitted by the Ministry of Culture and Tourism (MCT) (now the Ministry of Culture, Sports and Tourism (MCST)) which suggested that the site has encouraged users to commit copyright violations.

== Soribada 5 and 6 ==
Soribada Inc. settled with record labels and copyright owners in early 2008, (Note: The settlement agreement with Kakao Entertainment was finally made in June 2008, ending the two rivals' three-year long feud.) and it turned into a commercial music download service in July that same year. Soribada 5.0, current Soribada 6.0, is the third P2P service in the world that has become commercialised without hurting a P2P experience. Other such services include Monkey3 of Korea (owned by iHQ) and iMesh of the United States. Customers who pay the monthly fee of 7,000 won are able to download MP3 files without digital rights management (DRM). Like iTunes and other popular online music stores, Soribada utilises audio fingerprint technology to identify the purchaser. Soribada claims that it covers around 90% tracks that have been released in Korea. In January 2008, Soribada was the second largest music service provider in Korea with more than 700,000 paying subscribers.

== Investment from China ==
In February 2016, the Yang brothers (Junghwan and Ilhwan) sold their shares in Soribada to Shanghai-based investment, trade and e-commerce company ISPC International Limited. ISPC is founded and owned by the Shanghai Municipal Government. With this development, Yang Junghwan resigned from being Soribada's CEO.

The Yang brothers came back as minority investors in April 2016.
