= Down to Earth (EP) =

EP by Taeyang
- Released: April 25, 2023
- Studio: The Black Label (Seoul)
- Genres: R&B; hip hop; pop
- Length: 21:16
- Language: Korean
- Labels: The Black Label; Interscope
- Producers: Teddy Park; Kush; Nohc; Vince

Taeyang chronology
White Night (2017)	Down to Earth (2023)	Quintessence (2026)

Singles from Down to Earth
- 1. "Vibe" Released: January 13, 2023; 2. "Seed" Released: April 25, 2023

Down to Earth is the second extended play (EP) by South Korean singer Taeyang. It was released on April 25, 2023, and marked the singer's first album release through YG Entertainment's associate label The Black Label and Interscope Records, and also his first album in six years. The extended play features collaborations with Jimin of BTS, Lisa of Blackpink, Beenzino, and Bryan Chase. It was supported by two singles: "Vibe" (featuring Jimin), and "Seed".

== Release ==
Two videos were uploaded to YouTube alongside the release of Down the Earth—"Seed" and a "Shoong!" performance video. The black-and-white video for "Seed" features Taeyang walking along a beach and city streets, with color only being utilized in the video's final shots as the sun sets with Taeyang shown in the middle of a desert. The performance video for "Shoong!" finds Taeyang and Lisa performing the song's choreography against a futuristic set with pink and orange neon lighting.

== Composition ==
In an interview with Rolling Stone in January 2023, Taeyang explained that even though his album titles were always tied to his name, meaning "sun" in Korean, Down to Earth represented a concept a "little different" while still linked to the theme. Down to Earth shows Taeyang going back to his roots while pulling from decades of experience as a soloist and as part of the boy group Big Bang.

== Track listing ==
Down to Earth track listing
No.	Title	Lyrics	Music	Arrangement	Length
1.	"Vibe" (featuring Jimin of BTS)	Taeyang; Vince	Teddy Park; Kush; Vince; Taeyang; Jimin; 24	24; Kush	2:55
2.	"Shoong!" (슝!; Syung!; featuring Lisa of Blackpink)	Taeyang; Kush; Vince; Bekuh Boom	Kush; Vince; Dominsuk; Bekuh Boom	24; R. Tee; Vince; Dominsuk	3:25
3.	"Seed" (나의 마음에; Naui maeume; 'In My Mind')	Taeyang; Kush	Kush; Nohc; Vince	Nohc; 24; Kush	4:15
4.	"Reason" (나는; Naneun; 'I Am')	Taeyang; Kush; Vince	Vince; Kush; Danny Chung; Nohc; Big Banana; Chucky Kim	Nohc	3:22
5.	"Inspiration" (featuring Beenzino)	Taeyang; Beenzino; Vince	Kush; CK; Nohc; Vince	Kush; 24; CK; Nohc	3:32
6.	"Nightfall" (featuring Bryan Chase)	Taeyang; Bryan Chase	Kush; Vince; NOS; R. Tee; Bryan Chase; VVN	R. Tee; IDO; Kush; NOS; VVN	3:45
Total length:					21:16

== Charts ==
=== Weekly charts ===
Weekly chart performance for Down to Earth
Chart (2023)	Peak position
Japanese Albums (Oricon)	18
Japanese Combined Albums (Oricon)	29
Japanese Hot Albums (Billboard Japan)	15
South Korean Albums (Circle)	10

=== Monthly charts ===
Monthly chart performance for Down to Earth
Chart (2023)	Peak position
South Korean Albums (Circle)	20

== Release history ==
Release history for Down to Earth
Region	Date	Format	Label
Various	April 25, 2023	Digital download; streaming; CD	The Black Label; Interscope
