= Hot (Taeyang EP) =

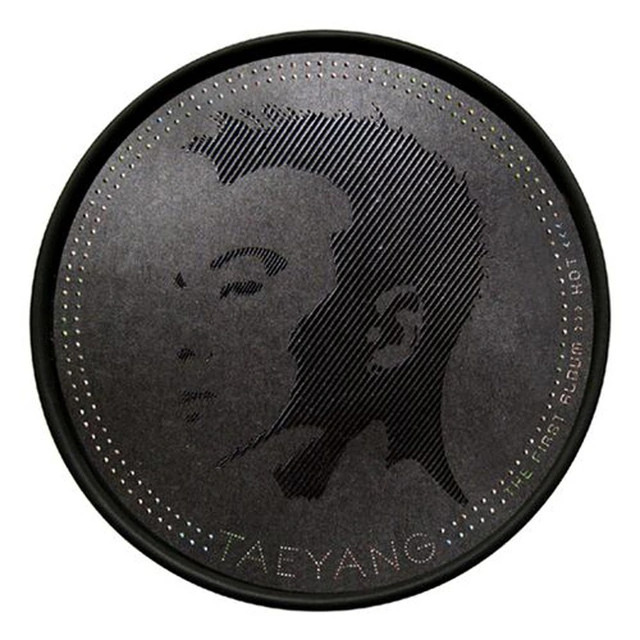

EP by Taeyang
- Released: May 22, 2008
- Recorded: 2008
- Studio: YG (Seoul)
- Genre: R&B; hip hop; pop
- Length: 19:55
- Language: Korean
- Label: YG
- Producer: Teddy Park; Kush

Taeyang chronology
Hot (2008)	Solar (2010)

Singles from Hot
- 1. "Only Look at Me" Released: May 22, 2008; 2. "Prayer (featuring Teddy)" Released: May 22, 2008

Hot is the debut extended play (EP) by South Korean singer Taeyang, a member of boy group Big Bang under YG Entertainment. It was released through YG Entertainment on May 22, 2008, as Taeyang's debut as a solo artist. Two singles were spawned from the EP—"Only Look at Me" featuring Teddy Park and "Prayer". It was the best-selling album of May 2008 with it being ranked at number 1 on the MIAK monthly album chart. Hot was well received by music critics, with the record winning two Korean Music Awards as well as Soribada naming it one of the best albums of the 2000s decade.

== Release ==
Two singles were released from the album at the same time as the EP's release, "Prayer" and "Only Look At Me", with music videos produced for each song. "Make Love" from this album was remade by BigBang to be used in their Japanese album Number 1. Bandmate G-Dragon recorded a "Part two" version of "Only Look At Me", and released it as a digital single, "Only Look at Me Part 2". Both versions were performed at the 2008 Mnet KM Music Festival, where each member of BigBang performed a song with the Korean singer Lee Hyori.

== Reception ==
=== Critical reception ===
The extended play was well received by fans and critics alike, winning two trophies at the 6th Korean Music Awards for the Best R&B / Soul Song for "Only Look at Me" and the Best R&B / Soul Album for Hot. At the 2008 Mnet KM Music Festival, "Only Look at Me" was nominated for Best Ballad/R&B Performance while "Prayer" was nominated for Best Music Video. Music critic Cha Woo-jin from webzine Weiv named it as one of his best albums of the 2000s, while in 2010, 39 music critics from Soribada and music webzine 100beat ranked Hot the 79th best album of the 2000s decade. Popular music critic Kim Hak-seon included Hot at number 17 in his introduction of 20 great albums from the 2000s in his book Capturing the K-POP World.

=== Commercial performance ===
Commercially, Hot received over 45,000 pre-orders the day before its release. It was the number-one album of May 2008 in South Korea, selling over 32,000 copies. By August 2008, it recorded sales of nearly 44,000 copies.

== Track listing ==
No.	Title	Lyrics	Music	Arrangement	Length
1.	"Intro – Hot"	G-Dragon	G-Dragon, Brave Brothers	Brave Brothers	1:30
2.	"Prayer (featuring Teddy)" (기도; Gido)	Teddy	Teddy, Kush, David Hallyday, Lisa Catherine Cohen	Teddy, Kush	3:41
3.	"Only Look at Me" (나만 바라봐; Naman Barabwa)	Teddy	Teddy, Kush	Teddy	4:01
4.	"Sinner" (죄인; Jwein)	Yang Hyun Suk	Gabe Lopez	Rebel, JV, Gabe Lopez	3:13
5.	"Baby I'm Sorry"	G-Dragon	Jeon Seung-woo	Jeon Seung-woo	4:06
6.	"Make Love (featuring Kush)"	Kush	Kush	Kush	3:25
Total length:					19:55

Sample credits

- "Prayer contains a sample of "High" by David Hallyday.

== Charts ==
=== Monthly charts ===
Chart (May 2008)	Peak position
South Korean Albums (MIAK)	1
