= Only Look at Me =

Single by Taeyang

from the EP Hot
- Language: Korean
- Released: May 22, 2008
- Studio: YG (Seoul)
- Genre: R&B
- Length: 4:01
- Label: YG
- Composers: Teddy; Kush
- Lyricist: Teddy
- Producer: Teddy

Taeyang singles chronology
"Only Look at Me" (2008)	"Prayer" (2008)

Music video
- "Only Look at Me'" on YouTube

"Only Look at Me" (Korean: 나만 바라봐; RR: Naman barabwa) is the debut solo single by South Korean singer Taeyang for his debut EP, Hot. It was released alongside the other single "Prayer" and the EP on May 22, 2008, by YG Entertainment.

Considered as Taeyang's breakthrough hit, the song won a trophy at the 6th Korean Music Awards for Best R&B / Soul Song and nominated for the Best Ballad/R&B Performance at the 2008 Mnet KM Music Festival.

== Background ==
Taeyang debuted as a member of the boy band BigBang in 2006, which rose through mainstream popularity through commercially successful releases Always and Hot Issue, in the following year.

On May 16, 2008, YG announced that Taeyang will release his debut EP, Hot, backed by "Only Look at Me" as the single, co-written by Teddy and Kush.

On June 30, bandmate G-Dragon released his own version of the song titled "Only Look at Me Pt. 2", marking the first time someone sung the music of an active singer in South Korea.

== Composition ==
Taeyang introduced "Only Look at Me" as a slow R&B song with a sophisticated arrangement co-written by Teddy and Kush. The lyrics was described as "selfish" feelings of men who want their girlfriends to only love them only, despite they cannot do the same to them.

G-Dragon's version featured a combination of rap and singing.

During his appearance on Fantastic Duo in 2017, Taeyang revealed the song was originally not written for him. However, upon hearing the song, he fell in love with it afterwards and persuaded the songwriters to allow him to record.

== Music video ==
The music video was released on May 22. It was produced in a drama-style format and Taeyang's BigBang bandmates took a break from their busy schedule to appear as cameos in the music video. Filipino-American choreographer, Shaun Evaristo designed the choreography for the song and remarked the experience as his favorite thing done so far.

== Live performances ==
Taeyang debuted the song live before studio audience at Show! Music Core on May 31. It was featured in his first solo concert "Hot" and BigBang's second concert tour "Global Warning Tour" in the same year. He performed the song as the opening act of Alicia Keys' As I Am Tour during its Seoul stop on August 7.

In 2010, the song was performed as the encore of "Solar Concert." Four years later, it was included in Taeyang's first world tour, Rise World Tour. The song was included in his second world tour, White Night World Tour in 2017. The following year, labelmate Blackpink included the song as part of Rosé's solo setlist in their In Your Area World Tour.

== Accolades ==
Music show awards
Program	Date	Rank	Ref.
M Countdown (Mnet)	June 19, 2008	1	
Inkigayo (SBS)	July 6, 2008	1	

Awards and nominations for "Only Look at Me"
Award	Year	Category	Result	Ref.
Mnet KM Music Festival	2008	Best Ballad/R&B Performance	Nominated	
Korean Music Awards	2009	Best R&B/Soul Song	Won	

== Credits and personnel ==
Credits adapted from the EP's liner notes.

Studio

- YG Studio – recording
- Sterling Sound – mastering

Personnel

- Yang Hyun-suk – executive producer
- Teddy Park – producer, lyricist, composer, arranger, recording director
- Kush – composer, arranger, recording director
- Taeyang – co-producer, vocals, recording director
- Jeon Seung-woo – recording director
- Lee Kyung-jun – recording, engineered for mix
- Oh Young-taek – recording
- Kim Chang-gyeom – recording
- Jason Robert – mixing
- Tally – mixing
- Tom Coyne – mastering

== Release history ==
Release history for "Only Look at Me"
Region	Date	Version	Format	Label
Various	May 22, 2008	"Only Look at Me"	Digital download; streaming	YG
Various	June 30, 2008	"Only Look at Me Pt. 2"	Digital download; streaming	YG
