= Taeyang =

South Korean singer (born 1988)

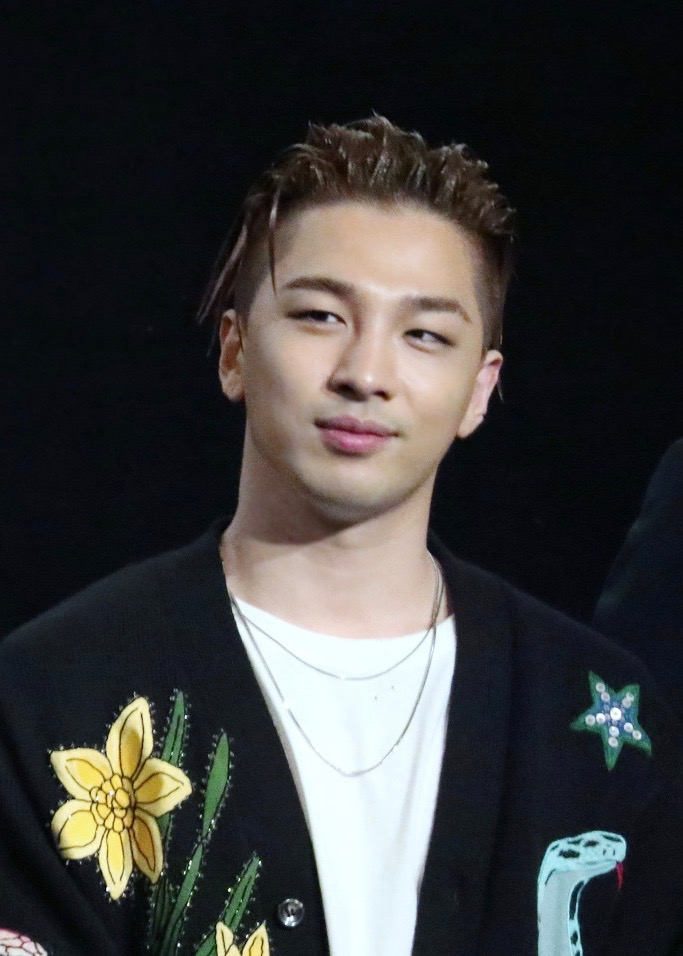
- Taeyang at the premiere of Big Bang Made on June 28, 2016
- Born: Dong Young-bae; May 18, 1988 (age 38); Uijeongbu, South Korea
- Occupations: Singer; songwriter; dancer
- Spouse: Min Hyo-rin (m. 2018)
- Children: 1
- Musical career
- Also known as: SOL
- Genres: K-pop; hip hop; R&B; EDM
- Instrument: Vocals
- Years active: 2006–present
- Labels: YG; YGEX; The Black Label; Interscope
- Member of: BigBang; GD X Taeyang
- Formerly of: YG Family

Korean name
- Hangul: 동영배
- RR: Dong Yeongbae
- MR: Tong Yŏngbae

Stage name
- Hangul: 태양
- RR: Taeyang
- MR: T'aeyang

Signature
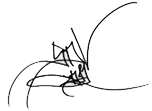

Dong Young-bae (Korean: 동영배; born May 18, 1988), better known by his stage name Taeyang (태양; lit. 'sun') or SOL, (Note: Only used in Japan.) is a South Korean singer and songwriter. He made his debut in 2006 as a member of the South Korean boy band BigBang. Following the release of several albums and extended plays with his group, Taeyang pursued a solo career in 2008, releasing his first extended play, Hot. The EP was acclaimed by critics and went to win the award for Best R&B & Soul Album at the 6th Korean Music Awards. Hot was followed by his first full-length studio album Solar (2010), which was released in July 2010 and peaked atop the Gaon Album Chart.

Taeyang's second studio album Rise (2014) peaked at number 112 on the US Billboard 200, becoming the highest ranking album by a Korean soloist in the chart, while its lead single, "Eyes, Nose, Lips", peaked at number one on the Billboard K-pop Hot 100. "Eyes, Nose, Lips" was one of the most popular songs in South Korea during 2014 and was awarded Song of the Year at the MAMA Awards, Melon Music Awards and Golden Disc Awards. His third studio album, White Night, released in 2017, debuted at number one on the Billboard's World Digital Albums and remained atop for two weeks, making Taeyang the second solo K-pop artist to have an album do so. Taeyang's vocal skills have been admired by music critics and he is regarded as one of the best vocalists in South Korea.

== Career ==
=== 2006–2008: Early beginnings and debut with Big Bang ===
Born and raised in Uijeongbu, South Korea, Dong Young-bae's first contact with music was playing the piano, where he enjoyed classical music composed by Ludwig van Beethoven and Franz Schubert. When his family began struggling financially, Dong felt the need to find a job to help support them at a young age. In sixth grade, he auditioned and won the part of "mini Sean" in Jinusean's music video "A-yo", where he was introduced to and became fascinated with hip hop music. On the occasion, Dong met Yang Hyun-suk CEO of the record label YG Entertainment and begged him for a chance to become a singer. As he got no answer, he went to his office personally to achieve his intention. Yang gave him the opportunity to audition, where he was successful, and accepted by the record label as a trainee. He met fellow trainee and future bandmate Kwon Ji-yong in. Youngbae spent the first few years as a trainee cleaning the studio for the other artists in the company and fetching them water bottles during dance practices, later admitting that current artists at the time weren't friendly towards him or Jiyong. In 2003, Youngbae provided the rap verse in singer Wheesung's single "Player" on the latter's second album.

Although Dong Youngbae was scheduled to debut alongside Kwon Jiyong as the hip hop duo GDYB (with Kwon choosing the stage-name G-Dragon, and Dong Young-Bae then initially choosing the name YB taekwon to rhyme with his bandmate G-Dragon), the plan was scrapped by their record label. Instead, they were joined by four other trainees (T.O.P, Daesung, Seungri, and Hyun-seung) to form the group BigBang. Their formation was documented on television, but before their official debut, Hyun-seung was dropped and their final lineup consisted of five members. Dong was initially hesitant about being placed in a band but eventually warmed up to the other members. Choosing the stage-name Taeyang (meaning sun) because "the sun is the brightest star from the incalculable stars in the universe",

Following the release of several single albums, BigBang's first album, Big Bang Vol. 1, was a moderate success, and included Taeyang's first solo song "Ma Girl". The group achieved mainstream success with the release of the song "Lies" from their first extended play (EP) Always (2007). This was followed by "Last Farewell" from Hot Issue (2007) and "Haru Haru" from Stand Up (2008); both were also chart-toppers.

=== 2008–2012: Solo career development and Solar ===
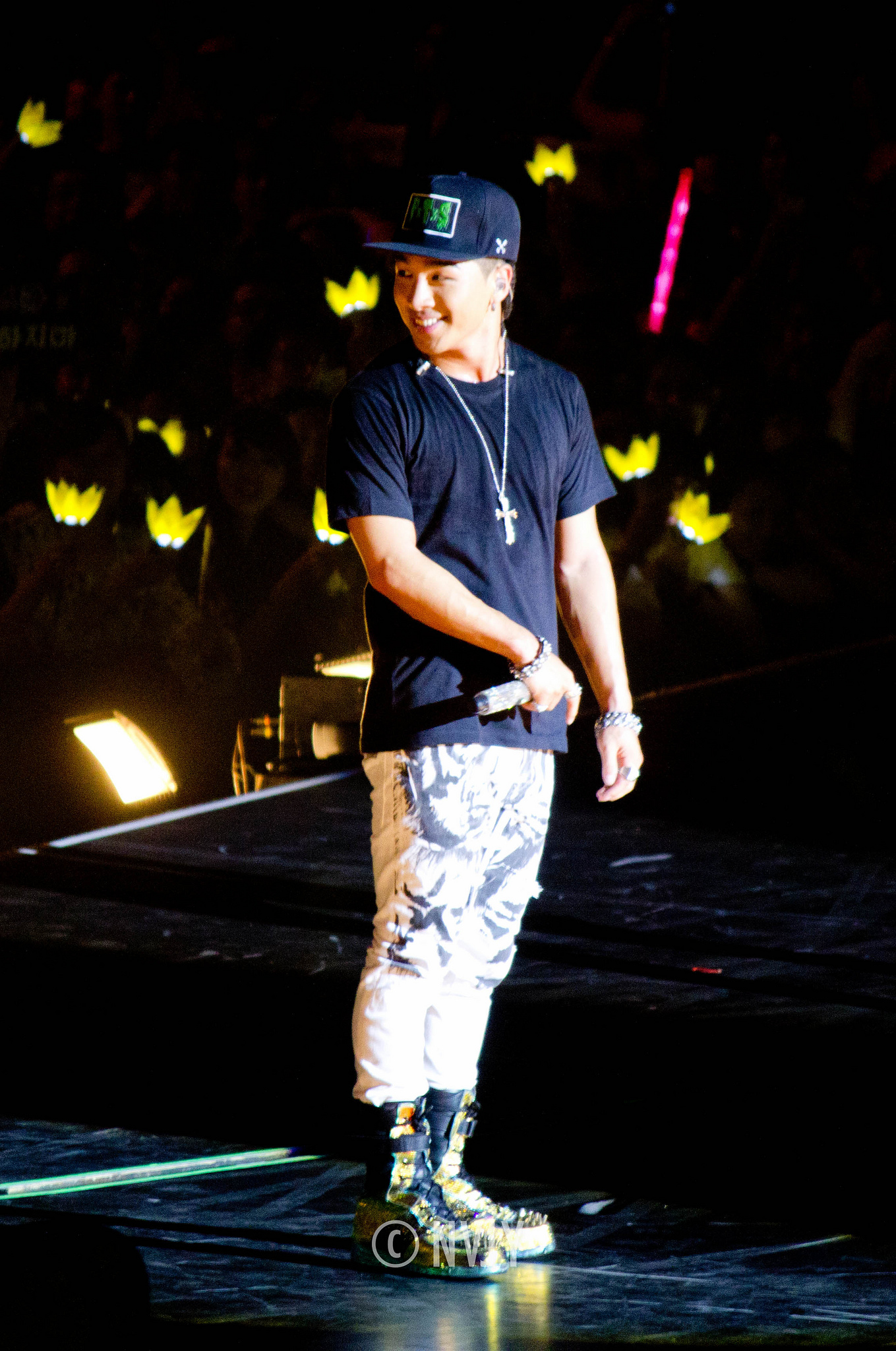
Taeyang performing on Big Bang's Alive World Tour in 2012

After contributing to singer Lexy's album, Taeyang announced that he was going to release a solo album. Initially scheduled for a September release, the project was pushed back due to conflicting schedules with his group. Instead, Taeyang released the EP Hot in May 2008, backed by a production team that included 1TYM's Teddy Park, Yang Hyun Suk, Kush, and his fellow member G-Dragon. (Note: According to the credits on the album's jacket.) Moving beyond the hip-hop genre of BigBang, Taeyang incorporated mainly R&B songs into his album, stating that it was his "main focus". He expressed disappointment with the album, however, admitting that he did not write any of the songs. He later stated that he would do so in the future to fully express and incorporate his thoughts and ideas into his music. The EP produced two singles: "Only Look at Me", an R&B song written by Teddy and Kush, and "Prayer" which featured Teddy. Promotional videos were shot for both. In support of his album, he also staged his first solo concert, the Hot Concert Series. Taeyang later received two awards from the 7th Korean Music Awards: Best R&B/Soul Song for "Only Look at Me" and Best R&B/Soul Album for Hot.

Throughout the majority of 2009, Taeyang contributed to his group's activities. After promotional activities ended, he went back to the studio to record new solo materials. Two digital singles were released: "Where U At" and "Wedding Dress" with promotional videos. The latter single ranked number three on an online music poll for a Dutch radio station. In December 2009, Hot was ranked amongst the best albums of the 2010s by music critic Cha Woo-jin from webzine Weiv. The following year, 39 music critics from Soribada and music webzine 100beat ranked Hot at number 79 in their list of the best albums of the 2000s. It was included at number 17 in music critic Kim Hak-seon's introduction of 20 great albums from the 2000s in his book Capturing the K-POP World.

Taeyang's first full-length album Solar was released in July 2010 in two versions: a "Regular Edition" and a "Deluxe Edition". The regular edition contained eleven songs while the deluxe edition, limited to only 30,000 copies, had 13 songs, including "Only Look at Me" and "Prayer" from Hot. The "Deluxe Edition" sold out on the first day of release. Two singles were released for promotions: "I Need a Girl" and "I'll Be There". In Solar, Taeyang contributed to its production; composing, co-writing four songs ("Solar", "Where U At", "Wedding Dress", and "Take It Slow") and writing lyrics for "Take It Slow". Taeyang won the "Best Male Artist" award at the 2010 Mnet Asian Music Awards. Both the regular and the deluxe versions peaked at the number one position on the Gaon Album Chart.

=== 2013–2016: Rise, first world tour and collaborations ===
Taeyang took two years to record new materials and participate in promotional activities with BigBang for their Korean EPs Tonight (2011) and Alive (2012) as well as the Japanese studio album Alive (2012). When activities wrapped up, he turned his focus back to preparing for his second studio album. The single "Ringa Linga" was released in November 2013, preceding his second album Rise (2014). While he utilized the help of Teddy Park, G-Dragon, and Choice37, Taeyang also involved himself with its production, producing six tracks. Rise became the third highest charting K-pop album, and also the highest charting K-pop album by a solo artist on the Billboard charts, reaching 112 on the Billboard Hot 200 while topping the Billboard World Albums Chart and Heatseekers Albums Chart, selling 3,000 copies. In Japan, the album ranked at number two, with 48,000 units sold. Taeyang released another two singles to promote the album: "Eyes, Nose, Lips" and "1AM". The former became his first chart topper on the Gaon Digital Chart while the latter peaked at number seven. The choreography for "Ringa Linga" spawned numerous covers on the video-sharing website YouTube, while "Eyes Nose Lips" was covered by various celebrities, including label-mates Akdong Musician, Tablo, Lydia Paek as well as Korean singer Eric Nam and Canadian pop star Michael Bublé. Comedian Yoo Jae-suk also parodied it on the popular variety program Infinite Challenge. "Eyes, Nose, Lips" was the second best-performing single of 2014 in South Korea.

Taeyang then embarked on the Rise World Tour in support of the album, visiting 9 countries and 16 cities in Asia beginning in August 2014. The tour concluded in early 2015 with an attendance of over 100,000 fans. At the 2014 Mnet Asian Music Awards, Taeyang won Best Male Artist, Best Vocal Performance and Song of the Year for "Eyes, Nose, Lips". Taeyang collaborated with G-Dragon in November 2014 to release the song "Good Boy" for YG Entertainment's new hip hop project. The song received positive reviews, with Fuse naming it one of best songs of the year, and debuted at the number one position on Billboard's World Digital Songs chart, the third time a Korean act topped the list and the first for a male group. The music video on YouTube currently boasts over 300 million views.

For two years from 2015 to 2016, Taeyang toured extensively with his band for their third Korean album, performing for over 3.6 million fans in two years. In 2015, Taeyang participated in the biennial Infinite Challenge music festival, with bandmate G-Dragon. The duo teamed up with ZE:A's Hwang Kwanghee and released the single "Mapsosa", which peaked at number two on the Gaon Digital Chart. The same year, he appeared on Mnet's Show Me The Money as a featured singer on labelmate Song Min-ho's single "Fear", composed by Zico during the semi-finals which became one of the best-selling singles of the year.

=== 2017–2021: White Night, second world tour and mandatory military service ===
In January 2017, YG Entertainment announced that Taeyang is working on his new album, alongside solo concerts. Taeyang commenced his second world tour, White Night, with stadium concerts in Japan. The first two shows were held at Chiba Marine Stadium and were attended by 50,000 people, which was followed by two shows at Kobe Sports Park Baseball Stadium. The tour is set to visit 19 cities around the world, including stops in North America, with concerts in eight cities across Canada and the United States.

Taeyang's third studio album, White Night, was released on August 16, 2017, with dual lead singles "Darling" and "Wake Me Up". "Darling" became a Top 10 hit on the Gaon Digital Chart while "Wake Me Up" managed to chart at number five on Billboard's World Digital Songs. Additionally, the album debuted at number one on the Billboard's World Digital Albums, and remained the following week atop this chart, making Taeyang the second solo K-Pop artist to have an album do so. In South Korea's Gaon Album Chart, the album peaked at number three, with over 57,000 copies sold in August.

On September, it was announced that Taeyang will appear on the upcoming JTBC survival audition program Mix Nine as a judge. Taeyang was revealed as one of the cast members of tvN's new variety program, Livin' the Double Life, along with CL and Oh Hyuk. Taeyang began his 21 months of mandatory military service on March 12, 2018, by entering the 6th Infantry Division's boot camp in Cheorwon, Gangwon Province as an active duty soldier. He was discharged on November 10, 2019, along with fellow BigBang member, Daesung.

=== 2022–present: New label and Down to Earth ===
In December, Taeyang signed a contract with YG Entertainment's affiliate, The Black Label and Interscope Records for representation outside of Asia. On January 13, 2023, he released the single titled "Vibe" featuring Jimin of BTS. On March 28, The Black Label confirmed that Taeyang would make a comeback in April. On April 12, Taeyang announced his second extended play Down to Earth to be released on April 25, with lead single "Seed" and B-side track "Shoong!" featuring Lisa of Blackpink.

On April 1, 2026, Taeyang announced his return to solo activities after about three years.

== Artistry ==
Taeyang stands out for "how serious he is about his craft and artistry", in opposition to the rest of the "manufactured confines of K-pop". Through his older brother, Taeyang met pop music at the age of six, with the music of American singer Michael Jackson, since then he has developed his musical interest mainly influenced by genres soul and R&B. However, he became mainly an R&B singer and dancer, but is also known for fusing hip-hop, soul, and EDM with R&B in his solo albums. Dazed claimed that his sound absorbs "style influences from punk to rap and twinning current underground R&B to his native, hyper-sonic pop music", while Allmusic described his material as "smart, hip-hop-flavored pop". Additionally, Billboard called him one of South Korea's "rare R&B stars". For his second album Rise (2014), Taeyang stated that while "R&B and hip-hop are a given", "there is also electronic, ballad, and rock", hoping to blend genres like Kanye West. Taeyang lists Miguel, Frank Ocean, The Weeknd, and Michael Jackson as his biggest influences, in particular the latter's album Xscape. Lyrically, he is known as a "specialist in love songs". His debut single, "Only Look at Me", narrates a selfish relationship, while in "I Need A Girl" he describes his ideal type.

Taeyang's voice is highly praised for its tone. Music critic Kim Young-dae called his timbre "luxurious and one you couldn't find before him", noting that "instead of giving off a mechanically trained and cold aura that other idols usually exhibit, he has a warm and full emotional range". In 2015, Taeyang was voted the third best K-Pop male vocalist by music industry officials. He was described as a "feline" and ferocious live performer by The New York Times. Once described to have "moves like Chris Brown [and] smooth vocals like Miguel", The Straits Times highlighted "his vocal prowess and sex appeal" as the best traits of his performances, and claimed that his free-styled moves show off "why he is often crowned the dancing king of K-pop". A review of his first solo tour stated that:

Taeyang's vocals glide effortlessly over the melodies as his body twists fluidly from one move to the next. But even as he dances in abandon, his movements are graceful and economical, a joy to watch.

== Other ventures ==
=== Endorsements and fashion ===
In 2017, Taeyang started endorsing auto maker Lexus, becoming the brand's Korean ambassador for their newest model LC500h, composing and writing the lyrics for the promotional song "So Good", which was released in May. Taeyang partnered with Italian fashion house Fendi to design an exclusive capsule collection line "Fendi for Taeyang" which features an array of T-shirts, hoodies, jackets, accessories and sneakers - with Taeyang's signature daisy-shaped motifs and positive words like, "Faith", "Grace", "Saved", and "Passion". The collection was released in Hong Kong on July 27. In 2023, Taeyang became the global brand ambassador of French fashion house Givenchy.

=== Philanthropy ===
In 2010, a part of Taeyang's income of albums, goods, tickets and digital music sales went for donation as a part of With campaign by YG Entertainment. Taeyang's fans donated IS$5,180 on May 15, 2014, under Taeyang's name to The May 18 Memorial Foundation in celebration of his birthday. The following year, they donated water wells to help provide clean water to communities in need in the Southeast Asian countries of Cambodia and Myanmar, they have been donating what they named as "Taeyang's water" for three straight years through the international charity organization Worldshare.

== Personal life ==
=== Beliefs ===
Taeyang is a devout Christian with multiple faith-inspired tattoos, including a large Christian Cross on his right rib cage and a mural-style tattoo across his shoulder blades depicting Jesus Christ on the cross, a centrally placed Christian Cross, and Jesus risen from the dead.

=== Marriage and family ===
He has been in a relationship with actress Min Hyo-rin since 2013. In December 2017, it was confirmed by their respective agencies that they planned to marry in February 2018. On February 3, 2018, Taeyang and Min married in a private ceremony with family and friends, officiated by actor Ki Tae-young. On September 27, 2021, it was reported that his wife, Min Hyo-rin was pregnant and expecting the couple's first child. Later that same day, her agency confirmed that she is indeed pregnant and is happily waiting to give birth soon. On December 6, 2021, media outlets revealed that Min recently gave birth to their first child. Later that same day, YG has confirmed that Min has delivered a baby safely and healthy.

== Achievements ==
Taeyang has earned two Golden Disc Awards, three Korean Music Awards, including Male Musician of the Year by Netizen Vote in 2011, three Melon Music Awards and four MAMA Awards. The release of his first full-length album, Solar, was the first K-Pop music release to be sold worldwide on iTunes as both an audio and video album. The audio version hit iTunes stores on August 19, 2010, while the video version arrived by September 10, 2010. His second album Rise in 2014 debuted at number 112 on Billboard 200 chart, becoming the highest entry by a Korean solo artist at the time. His song "Eyes, Nose, Lips", released in 2014, won Song of the Year in all major Korean awards, including the MAMA Awards, Melon Music Awards, and Golden Disc Awards, becoming the first male solo artist to do so. In 2017, Taeyang was appointed as an honorary ambassador for the 2018 Winter Olympics in Pyeongchang, being tasked with extolling the virtues of South Korea for the world. He was named GQ Korea's Man of the Year three times in 2008, 2010, and 2017 and was voted the fifth best role model of 2014 in a survey of 144 idols in South Korea.

== Discography ==
- Solar (2010)
- Rise (2014)
- White Night (2017)
- Quintessence (2026)

== Tours and concerts ==
=== Tours ===
- Rise World Tour (2014–15)
- White Night World Tour (2017)
- The Light Year Tour (2024)

The Light Year World Tour
Date	City	Country	Venue	Attendance
August 31, 2024	Seoul	South Korea	Olympic Hall	6,000
September 1, 2024	Seoul	South Korea	Olympic Hall	6,000
September 26, 2024	Osaka	Japan	Edion Arena Osaka	—
September 27, 2024	Osaka	Japan	Edion Arena Osaka	—
September 30, 2024	Tokyo	Japan	Ariake Arena	—
October 4, 2024	Hong Kong		AsiaWorld–Arena	20,000
October 5, 2024	Hong Kong		AsiaWorld–Arena	20,000
November 27, 2024	Sydney	Australia	ICC Sydney Theatre	—
November 29, 2024	Melbourne	Australia	John Cain Arena	—
December 7, 2024	Kuala Lumpur	Malaysia	Axiata Arena	—
December 14, 2024	Taipei	Taiwan	Taipei Music Center	4,500
February 1, 2025	Incheon	South Korea	Inspire Arena	17,000
February 2, 2025	Incheon	South Korea	Inspire Arena	17,000
February 8, 2025	Bangkok	Thailand	Impact Arena	—
February 15, 2025	Macau		Galaxy Arena	—
February 16, 2025	Macau		Galaxy Arena	—
February 22, 2025	Manila	Philippines	SM Mall of Asia Arena	—
Total				123,000

Canceled Show
Date	City	Country	Venue	Reason
January 25, 2025	Jakarta	Indonesia	Beach City International Stadium	unforeseen circumstances

=== Fanmeeting ===
Title	Date	City	Country	Venue	Ref.
Taeyang 2025 Fan Meeting [01]	July 26, 2025	Seoul	South Korea	Bluesquare Sol Travel Hall	
Taeyang 2025 Fan Meeting [01]	August 29, 2025	Fukuoka	Japan	Fukuoka Civic Hall	
Taeyang 2025 Fan Meeting [01]	August 30, 2025	Hiroshima	Japan	Hiroshima Bunka Gakuen HBG Hall	
Taeyang 2025 Fan Meeting [01]	September 8, 2025	Osaka	Japan	Grand Cube Osaka Main Hall	
Taeyang 2025 Fan Meeting [01]	September 9, 2025	Osaka	Japan	Grand Cube Osaka Main Hall	
Taeyang 2025 Fan Meeting [01]	October 25, 2025	Shizuoka	Japan	Fuji-city Cultural Hall	
Taeyang 2025 Fan Meeting [01]	October 26, 2025	Shizuoka	Japan	Fuji-city Cultural Hall	
Taeyang 2025 Fan Meeting [01]	November 13, 2025	Tokyo	Japan	Tachikawa Stage Garden	
Taeyang 2025 Fan Meeting [01]	November 14, 2025	Tokyo	Japan	Tachikawa Stage Garden	
Taeyang 2025 Fan Meeting [01]	November 29, 2025	Miyagi	Japan	Sendai Sunplaza Hall	

== Filmography ==
=== Television series ===
Year	Title	Roles
2010	Real Sound by Taeyang	Cast Member
2017–18	Mix Nine	Judge
2017–18	Livin' the Double Life	Cast Member

== Notes ==
Awards and achievements
Preceded by Tiger JK	12th Mnet Asian Music Awards – Best Male Solo Artist; 2010	Succeeded by Kim Hyun-joong
Preceded by G-Dragon	16th Mnet Asian Music Awards – Best Male Solo Artist; 2014	Succeeded by Park Jin Young
