= Wedding Dress (Taeyang song) =

Single by Taeyang

from the album Solar
- Language: Korean; English
- Released: November 13, 2009
- Studio: YG (Seoul)
- Genre: R&B; dance-pop
- Length: 4:03
- Label: YG
- Composers: Teddy Park; Taeyang
- Lyricist: Teddy Park
- Producers: Teddy Park; Taeyang

Taeyang singles chronology
"Where U At" (2009)	"Wedding Dress" (2009)	"I Need a Girl" (2010)

Music video
- "Wedding Dress" on YouTube

"Wedding Dress" is a song recorded by South Korean singer Taeyang, and released as the second single of his first studio album Solar (2010) on November 13, 2009, through YG Entertainment. It was written by Teddy Park and composed by Park and Taeyang.

== Background and composition ==
After his solo debut with the extended play Hot a year prior was acclaimed by music critics and the public, YG Entertainment announced that Taeyang would release two monthly digital singles to precede his first studio album. The first single, "Where U At", was released on October and "Wedding Dress" followed in November.

"Wedding Dress" was described as a slow R&B song. Lyrically, the single describes a man who loves a woman that is going to marry another man, expressed by Taeyang's "bitter" and sad vocals. "Wedding Dress" was composed using common time in the key of A minor, with a moderate tempo of 130 beats per minute. The vocals span from the lower octave of E_{4} to the higher note of A_{5}.

== Reception ==
"Wedding Dress" received international attention. In North America, the single gained popularity on the streaming site YouTube due to English covers and multiple parodies of the music video. This allowed his album, Solar, to top the Canadian and reach the Top 3 in the American iTunes R&B / Soul album chart, making Taeyang the first Asian artist to do so. Additionally, "Wedding Dress" reached a peak position of number three in its sixth charting week on Billboard World Digital Songs.

In Europe, even though there was no special publicity campaign to advertise the song, "Wedding Dress" ranked at number three in the Fun X Radio X-tips Chart of the Dutch music radio station FunX, based on the number of hits on the song and its music video and an online poll.

== Charts ==
=== Weekly charts ===
Weekly chart performance for "Wedding Dress"
Chart (2010)	Peak position
US Billboard World Digital Chart	3

== Release history ==
Release history for "Wedding Dress"
Region	Date	Language	Format	Label
Various	November 13, 2009	Korean	Digital download; streaming	YG
Various	August 19, 2010	English	Digital download; streaming	YG
