= White Night (album) =

- Digital/White cover

Studio album by Taeyang
- Released: August 16, 2017
- Recorded: 2013–17
- Studio: The Black Label (Seoul)
- Genre: R&B; electronic
- Language: Korean
- Label: YG
- Producer: Taeyang; Teddy; Kush; Choice37; Future Bounce; Peejay; Seo Won Jin; P.K; R. Tee; 8!; Brian Lee; 24; Joe Rhee

Taeyang chronology
| Rise (2014) | White Night (2017) | Down to Earth (2023) |

Singles from White Night
- 1. "Darling" Released: August 16, 2017; 2. "Wake Me Up" Released: August 16, 2017

White Night (stylized in all caps) is the third studio album by South Korean singer Taeyang. It was released on August 16, 2017 and is his first album in three years since Rise (2014).

== Background and release ==
In January 2017, YG Entertainment announced that Taeyang is working on his new album, alongside solo concerts. In July, Taeyang began filming the music videos in Los Angeles and Alaska in the United States, and a spoiler of the music video was posted online by Yang Hyun-suk on July 22.

On August 7, the name and release date of the album was officially announced. On August 9, the music video for the "Intro" of the album was released, which was shot in Los Angeles and Alaska. The music video portrays the meaning behind the album title, that of "white night which is a natural phenomenon of the sun not going down even in the night," according to the label's representative. The lead single "Darling", was announced on August 10, with lyrics written by long-time collaborator and YG producer Teddy, and produced by the former with 8!, Brian Lee, Choice37 and Future Bounce. Taeyang revealed that the initial idea for the song was conceived four years earlier in 2013. The second single, "Wake Me Up", was written by Kush and Joe Rhee from YG's sub label, The Black Label, and produced by the two with R.Tee. It was revealed that Block B's Zico is featuring on a song from the album.

== Composition ==
White Night was noted for being "filled with evocative melodies and heartfelt lyrics" while exploring "a range of emotions through a variety of musical influences, with a certain preference for the melancholic blend of EDM". The record was described as electro-R&B, offering "slick R&B hooks, punchy choruses and atmospheric synths." Known as Big Bang's "resident R&B smooth crooner", Taeyang projects "himself as an irresistible mournful lover" with his "mellow and soulful vocals".

=== Music and lyrics ===
The album starts with the title track and intro "White Night" that runs only for around one minute and a half, being described as a "psychedelic stomper" that "launches into a progressive frenzy of electronic grooves and trancey rhythms", while speaking of "cherishing the moment with a loved one and wanting that moment to last forever." The second song and single "Wake Me Up" was described as having a "dream-like atmosphere", featuring "strong EDM beats", and an introduction use sounds that "play off the notion of dawn and the various fauna that can be heard during that time." In the single, Taeyang sings "Is it love? / If I want this moment to last forever", making it sound like a "confessional ballad", before building up to a "dancefloor-ready chorus." The lead single, "Darling" is a R&B ballad that was compared to his previous single "Eyes, Nose, Lips". Lyrically, the song "shows sensibility for one's significant others' actions and claims", while the singer realizes the "imminence of the moment's end, then the resulting heartache."

"Ride", which drew comparisons to the works of Michael Jackson and Usher, is a "impassioned after-hours early mid tempo track", "featuring smooth early 90s rhythms", while Taeyang sings with a "a go-weak-in-the-knees falsetto." The nu-disco song, "Amazin'", was described as a "slow-burner of a club banger" with a Weeknd production style. Lyrically, the song narrates that "a ex has attempted to resurface in his life", but the singer "is firm and resolute in not allowing her to invade his mind and heart as she did previously." The following "Empty Road" is an acoustic soft rock number, where Taeyang sings with "vulnerability" the lyrics "Because I miss you so much / Now it's an empty road with nothing in it."

"Naked" was noted for being for "mature and sensual" with an "updated Al Green-esque feel", that firsts sounds like a ballad before moving into a "fist-pumping, synth-laden chorus". The last track on the album, "Tonight", was labelled a "percussion-heavy song takes some interesting artistic liberties". A R&B song with rock influences, the songs uses a "languid bass line" over more adult lyrics, such as "It's no fun to drag it out anymore yeah? / Let's get to the point". The tracks ends with "power vocals" in the "harmonic layering" "40-second finale" that felt "almost as if he did not want to stop singing at this point."

== Packaging ==
The physical CD album contains handmade elements, featuring a collage of real flowers and feathers in the album jacket. This special edition was released in three different versions: white, red, and blue.

== Promotion ==
On March 31, it was announced through YGEX that Taeyang will embark on a summer stadium tour in Japan. On July 4, it was confirmed that the tour will be a full-scale world tour, and would visit 19 cities across Asia and North America. Taeyang will be performing all the songs off the album for the first time during the concert in Seoul on August 26, 2017.

To promote his album, Taeyang is scheduled to appear in many television programs, with the first being MBC's I Live Alone to be broadcast on August 18.

== Commercial performance ==
The album was made available for pre-order on August 14, on China's QQ Music, and within a few hours of release, it achieved gold status with a total of 16,000 digital copies sold. In one day, the album achieved 100,000 digital copies sold. White Night debuted at number-one on the Billboard World Digital Albums chart, becoming the best-selling international album in the United States for the week of September 2. It remained at its peak position for the second week, making Taeyang the third K-pop act and second soloist, after bandmate G-Dragon, to spend multiple weeks atop the World Albums chart.

In South Korea, White Night debuted at number three on the Gaon Albums Chart. The album has sold 47,365 copies by the end of 2017.

== Critical reception ==
Professional ratings
Review scores
| Source | Rating |
|---|---|
| IZM | 2/5 stars |
| The Star | 7/10 |

In a review for Billboard, columnist Jeff Benjamin highlighted Taeyang's ability to keep his core R&B sound, but experiment with new sounds and themes. He wrote, "The LP's overarching electro-R&B theme is set by the introduction track 'White Night' and sealed as it moves into the gorgeous 'Wake Me Up' single with its waterfalls of moving synthesizers. The sensual standout 'Naked' sees Tae passionately pleading a case for intimacy ('I want you naked/ Through the night,' he sings over punchy production) while the record's sole collaboration on 'Tonight' featuring Zico sees the guys detailing the intricate intimacies of transforming a hook up into true love among a slew of sexy lyrics (Good luck not getting chills when Taeyang closes the track belting 'Let's make love because it feels so right/ Tonight is the night/ We can't stop, baby, won't stop' in his best Michael Jackson impression). Yet among all the artistic boundaries Taeyang pushes here, the simple piano ballad single 'Darling' mostly proves how the 29-year-old's most precious instrument is his own voice."

Singaporean magazine Teenage felt that the album was "perhaps his most sonicaly intriguing to date" and hailed "Taeyang's expressive vocals - which sound right at home no matter what genre he goes for - and lovelorn lyrics" the reasons why the record "grabs you by the throat relentlessly till the last note." Affinity Magazine named White Night the best K-pop album of the year, writing that the whole record "flirts with the R&B sound he usually goes for", and feeling that it was "one of those works you couldn't get tired of, even if you wanted to. That's what a beautiful voice singing with emotion can do."

== Track listing ==
| No. | Title | Lyrics | Music | Arrangement | Length |
|---|---|---|---|---|---|
| 1. | "White Night" (白夜) | Taeyang; Joe Rhee | 24; Joe Rhee; Teddy; 8!; Brian Lee | 24; Joe Rhee | 1:26 |
| 2. | "Wake Me Up" | Kush; Joe Rhee | Kush; Joe Rhee; R. Tee | Kush; R.Tee | 3:19 |
| 3. | "Darling" | Teddy | Teddy; 8!; Brian Lee; Choice37; Future Bounce | Teddy; Choice37; Future Bounce; Seo Won Jin | 3:30 |
| 4. | "Ride" | Taeyang; Joe Rhee; 24 | Joe Rhee; 24; Teddy | Joe Rhee; 24 | 3:14 |
| 5. | "Amazin′" | Taeyang; Joe Rhee; 24 | Taeyang; Joe Rhee; 24; Teddy | 24; Joe Rhee | 3:39 |
| 6. | "Empty Road" (텅빈도로) | Kush; Taeyang; Joe Rhee | Kush; Taeyang; Peejay; Seo Won Jin | Seo Won Jin; 24; Joe Rhee | 3:30 |
| 7. | "Naked" | Joe Rhee | Taeyang; Joe Rhee; 24 | 24 | 3:22 |
| 8. | "Tonight" (오늘밤; featuring Zico) | Kush; Taeyang; Zico | Peejay; Kush; Taeyang | Peejay | 4:27 |

Japanese edition
| No. | Title | Length |
|---|---|---|
| 9. | "So Good" (Korean Version) |

== Credits and personnel ==
Credits adapted from the liner notes of White Night.

Studio

- The Black Label Studio

Technical

- Lee Kyung-jun – producing engineer, recording engineer
- Randy Merrill (Sterling Sound, New York) – mastering
- Jason Robert (The Lab, Los Angeles) – mixing engineer
- Kim Sang-il – recording engineer
- Yongin Choi – recording engineer

Personnel

- Taeyang – vocals, production, lyrics (1, 4–6, 8), composition (5–8)
- Yang Hyun-suk – executive production
- Teddy – lyrics (3), composition (1, 3–5), arrangement (3)
- Kush – lyrics (2, 6, 8), composition (6, 8), arrangement (2)
- Choice37 – composition (3), arrangement (3)
- Future Bounce – composition (3), arrangement (3)
- Peejay – composition (6, 8), arrangement (8), keyboards (8)
- Seo Won Jin – composition (6), arrangement (3, 6), guitar (3–6), bass (8)
- 8! – composition (1, 3)
- Brian Lee – composition (1, 3)
- R. Tee – composition (2), arrangement (2)
- 24 – lyrics (4, 5), composition (1, 4, 5, 7), arrangement (1, 4–7)
- Joe Rhee – lyrics (1–2, 4–7), composition (1–2, 4–5, 7), arrangement (1, 4, 5–6)
- Zico – lyrics (8)

Additional musicians

- Lee Tae-yoon – bass (3, 6)
- Jung Hye-rim – cello (3)
- Kang Hyun-woong – viola (3)
- Kim Ye-na – violin (3)
- Park Seung-kyung – violin (3)
- Yang Ji-won – violin (3)
- Ju Young-hae – violin (3)
- Park Joong-hoon – piano (4, 6)
- Seo Jeong-hoon – synth (6)
- Jung Yoo Jong – guitar (8)

Design

- Jieun – visual direction
- Kim Hyung-sik – photography
- Kim Hee-jun – photography
- Lee Seon-mi – make up
- Rim Hae-kyung – make up
- Kim Tae-hyun – hair

== Charts ==
=== Weekly charts ===
Weekly chart performance for White Night
| Chart (2017) | Peak position |
|---|---|
| French Download Albums (SNEP) | 33 |
| Japan Hot Albums (Billboard) | 15 |
| Japan Albums (Oricon) | 8 |
| New Zealand Heatseekers Albums (RMNZ) | 7 |
| South Korean Albums (Gaon) | 3 |
| US Heatseekers Albums (Billboard) | 1 |
| US Independent Albums (Billboard) | 12 |
| US World Albums (Billboard) | 1 |

== Sales ==
| Country | Sales |
|---|---|
| China | 160,000 |
| United States | 3,000 |
| South Korea | 47,365 |

== Release history ==
Release history for White Night
| Country | Date | Label | Format | Ref |
|---|---|---|---|---|
| Various | August 16, 2017 | YG Entertainment | Digital download; streaming | |
| South Korea | August 22, 2017 | YG Entertainment | CD | |
| Japan | January 10, 2018 | YGEX | CD; CD+DVD; Playbutton | |
