= I Need a Girl (Taeyang song) =

Single by Taeyang featuring G-Dragon

from the album Solar
- Language: Korean
- Released: July 1, 2010
- Studio: YG (Seoul)
- Genre: R&B
- Length: 3:40
- Label: YG
- Composer: Jeon Goon
- Lyricists: Jeon Goon; G-Dragon
- Producer: Jeon Goon

Taeyang singles chronology
"Wedding Dress" (2009)	"I Need a Girl" (2010)	"I'll Be There" (2010)

G-Dragon singles chronology
"Heartbreaker" (2009)	"I Need a Girl" (2010)	"That XX" (2012)

Music video
- "I Need a Girl" on YouTube

"I Need a Girl" is a song recorded by South Korean singer Taeyang for his first studio album Solar (2010) through YG Entertainment. It features rap by G-Dragon, who co-wrote the song with producer Jeon Goon. The song was released on July 1, 2010, as the lead single from Solar.

== Composition ==
"I Need a Girl" is described as an R&B song that lyrically expresses Taeyang's ideal type. Some parts of the lyrics are taken from Byeon Jin-seop's song "My Ideal Type" (1989).

== Commercial performance ==
"I Need a Girl" debuted at number seven on South Korea's Gaon Digital Chart in the chart issue dated June 27 – July 3, 2010. On its component charts, the song debuted at number four on the Gaon Download Chart, and number 25 on the Gaon Streaming Chart. The following week, it rose to number four on the Gaon Digital Chart. Subsequently, "I Need a Girl" ranked at number thirty-nine on the annual chart and sold 1,876,167 digital copies in South Korea as of 2010.

In United States, "I Need a Girl" debuted at number seventeen on the Billboard World Digital Song Sales chart in the issue dated July 31, 2010.

== Accolades ==
Music program awards
Program	Date	Ref.
Inkigayo	July 18, 2010	
Inkigayo	July 25, 2010	
M Countdown	July 8, 2010	
M Countdown	July 15, 2010	
Music Bank	July 16, 2010	

== Charts ==
=== Weekly charts ===
Weekly chart performance for "I Need a Girl"
Chart (2010)	Peak position
South Korea (Gaon)	4
US World Digital Songs (Billboard)	17

=== Monthly charts ===
Monthly chart performance for "I Need a Girl"
Chart (2010)	Peak position
South Korea (Gaon)	4

=== Year-end chart ===
Year-end chart performance for "I Need a Girl"
Chart (2010)	Position
South Korea (Gaon)	39
