= T.O.P discography =

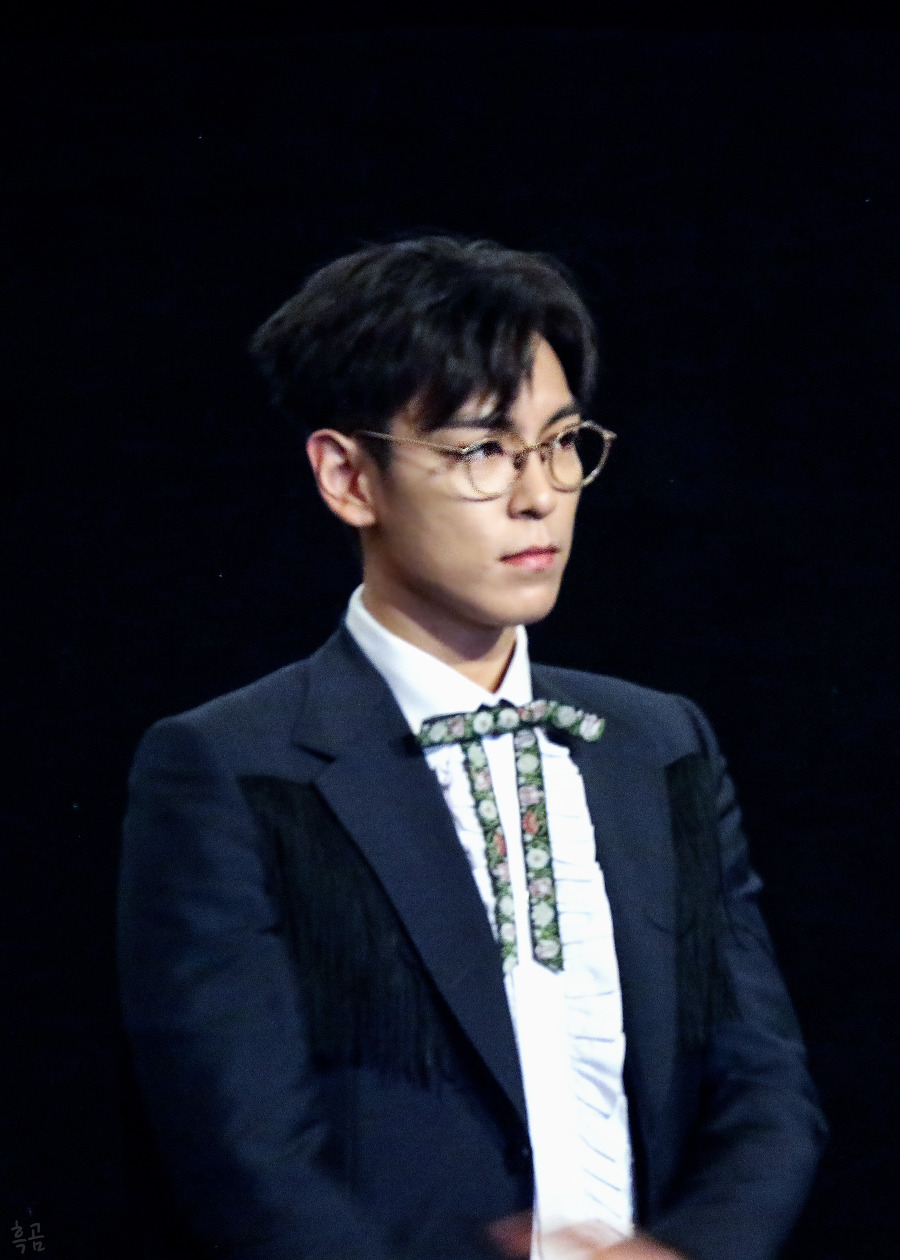
- T.O.P in the premiere of the movie "Big Bang Made" in June 28, 2016
- Studio albums: 1
- Singles: 2
- Music videos: 4

Choi Seung-hyun (Korean: 최승현; born November 4, 1987), known professionally as T.O.P, is a South Korean rapper and former member of the South Korean band Big Bang. He made his solo debut in 2010 with the release of the digital single "Turn It Up". Later that year, T.O.P and his bandmate G-Dragon formed a subunit to release the album GD & TOP (2010). His second single, "Doom Dada" was released in 2013.

== Albums ==
=== Studio albums ===
List of studio albums, with selected details
| Title | Album details | Peak chart positions | | Sales |
| Title | Album details | KOR | US World | Sales |
|---|---|---|---|---|
| Another Dimension | Released: April 3, 2026; Label: Topspot Pictures; Format: CD, digital download | 7 | 20 | KOR: 131,409; JPN: 211 |

=== Single albums ===
List of single albums, with selected chart positions and sales figures
| Title | Album details | Peak chart positions | Sales |
| Title | Album details | KOR | Sales |
|---|---|---|---|
| Doom Dada (Special Edition) | Released: December 16, 2013; Label: YG Entertainment; Format: CD, digital download | 3 | KOR: 20,885 |

== Singles ==
=== As a lead artist ===
List of singles as lead artist, with selected chart positions, showing year released and album name
| Title | Year | Peak chart positions | | Sales (Note: Sales figures for tracks are based on digital downloads, except noted.) | Album |
| Title | Year | KOR | US World | Sales | Album |
|---|---|---|---|---|---|
| "Turn It Up" | 2010 | 2 | — | KOR: 1,380,732 | GD & TOP |
| "Doom Dada" | 2013 | 4 | 3 | KOR: 602,050 | Doom Dada (Special Edition) |
| "Studio54" (완전미쳤어!) | 2026 | — (Note: "Studio54" did not enter the Circle Digital Chart, but peaked at number 51 on the component Circle Download Chart.) | — | | Another Dimension |
| "Desperado" | 2026 | — (Note: "Desperado" did not enter the Circle Digital Chart, but peaked at number 24 on the component Circle Download Chart.) | — | | Another Dimension |
"—" denotes releases that did not chart or were not released in that region.

=== As featured artist ===
| Title | Year | Peak chart positions | Sales | Album |
| Title | Year | KOR | Sales | Album |
|---|---|---|---|---|
| "Buckwild" (NBK Gray featuring T.O.P) | 2007 | — | —N/a | —N/a |
| "I'm Sorry" (Gummy featuring T.O.P) | 2008 | — | —N/a | Comfort |
| "D.I.S.C.O" (Uhm Jung-hwa featuring T.O.P) | 2008 | — | —N/a | D.I.S.C.O |
| "All I See Is You" (Zia featuring T.O.P) | 2008 | — | —N/a | Road Movie |
| "Digital Bounce" (Se7en featuring T.O.P) | 2010 | 22 | KOR: 1,013,703 | Digital Bounce |
| "I'm Sorry" (ゴメンネ) (Gummy featuring T.O.P) | 2011 | — | —N/a | Loveless (Japanese Edition) |
| "Dancing on My Own" (Pixie Lott featuring T.O.P & G-Dragon) | 2012 | 36 | KOR: 342,113 | Young Foolish Happy (Deluxe Edition) |
| "Bubble Butt" (Major Lazer featuring Bruno Mars, G-Dragon, T.O.P, Tyga and Mystic) | 2013 | 78 | KOR: 95,848 | Free the Universe (Asian Edition) |
"—" denotes releases that did not chart or were not released in that region.

== Soundtrack appearances ==
List of soundtrack appearances, showing year released, and name of the album
| Title | Year | Album |
|---|---|---|
| "Friend" (featuring Taeyang) | 2009 | Friend, Our Legend OST |
| "Because" | 2010 | 19 OST |
| "Hi Haruka" | 2015 | Secret Message OST |

== Other charted songs ==
| Title | Year | Peak chart positions | Album |
| Title | Year | KOR | Album |
|---|---|---|---|
| "Of All Days" | 2011 | 45 | GD & TOP |
| "Oh Mom" | 2011 | 60 | GD & TOP |

== Songwriting credits ==
All song credits are adapted from the Korea Music Copyright Association's database unless stated otherwise.

=== Solo work ===
List of songs, showing year released, and name of the album
| Year | Song | Album | Lyricist | | Composer | |
| Year | Song | Album | Credited | With | Credited | With |
|---|---|---|---|---|---|---|
| 2006 | "Big Boy" | Bigbang Vol.1 | Yes | – | Yes | Brave Brothers |
| 2007 | "Pretended" (featuring Kim Ji-eun) | Always | Yes | – | Yes | Brave Brothers |
| 2008 | "A Good Man" | Stand Up | Yes | – | Yes | Kush |
| 2010 | "Turn It Up" | Non-album single | Yes | – | Yes | Teddy |
| 2010 | "Oh Mom" | GD & TOP | Yes | – | Yes | 1ON, E.Knock |
| 2010 | "Of All Days" | GD & TOP | Yes | – | Yes | Choice37 |
| 2013 | "Doom Dada" | Doom Dada (Special Edition) | Yes | – | Yes | Choice37 |
| 2015 | "Hi Haruka" | Secret Message OST | Yes | Kush | No | – |

=== Work as Big Bang ===
List of songs, showing year released, and name of the album
| Year | Song | Album | Lyricist | | Composer | |
| Year | Song | Album | Credited | With | Credited | With |
|---|---|---|---|---|---|---|
| 2006 | "We Belong Together" (featuring Park Bom) | Big Bang | Yes | G-Dragon | No | – |
| 2006 | "La La La" | Big Bang Is V.I.P | Yes | Taeyang, G-Dragon, Daesung, Seungri | No | – |
| 2006 | "V.I.P" | Big Bang Is V.I.P | Yes | Taeyang, G-Dragon, Daesung, Seungri | No | – |
| 2006 | "Forever With U" (featuring Park Bom) | Big Bang 03 | Yes | G-Dragon | No | – |
| 2006 | "Intro (Big Bang)" | Big Bang Vol.1 | Yes | Taeyang, G-Dragon, Daesung, Seungri | No | – |
| 2007 | "We are Big Bang (Intro)" | Always | Yes | Taeyang, G-Dragon, Daesung, Seungri | No | – |
| 2008 | "VIP (Intro)" | For the World | Yes | Taeyang, G-Dragon, Daesung, Seungri | No | – |
| 2008 | "Stand Up (Intro)" | Stand Up | Yes | G-Dragon | No | – |
| 2010 | "Lollipop Pt.2" | Non-album single | Yes | Teddy, G-Dragon | No | – |
| 2011 | "Intro (Thank You & You)" | Tonight | Yes | G-Dragon | No | – |
| 2011 | "Tonight" | Tonight | Yes | G-Dragon | No | – |
| 2011 | "Hands Up" | Tonight | Yes | G-Dragon | No | – |
| 2011 | "Somebody to Love" | Tonight | Yes | G-Dragon | No | – |
| 2011 | "What Is Right" | Tonight | Yes | G-Dragon | No | – |
| 2011 | "Cafe" | Tonight | Yes | G-Dragon | No | – |
| 2011 | "Love Song" | Big Bang Special Edition | Yes | Teddy, G-Dragon | No | – |
| 2011 | "Stupid Liar" | Big Bang Special Edition | Yes | G-Dragon | No | – |
| 2011 | "Koe o Kikasete" | Big Bang 2 | Yes | Yamamoto Narumi, Choice37, G-Dragon | No | – |
| 2012 | "Intro (Alive)" | Alive | Yes | Teddy, G-Dragon | No | – |
| 2012 | "Blue" | Alive | Yes | Teddy, G-Dragon | No | – |
| 2012 | "Love Dust" | Alive | Yes | Teddy, G-Dragon | No | – |
| 2012 | "Bad Boy" | Alive | Yes | G-Dragon | No | – |
| 2012 | "Ain't No Fun" | Alive | Yes | G-Dragon | No | – |
| 2012 | "Fantastic Baby" | Alive | Yes | Teddy, G-Dragon | No | – |
| 2012 | "Still Alive" | Still Alive | Yes | Teddy, G-Dragon | No | – |
| 2012 | "Monster" | Still Alive | Yes | G-Dragon | No | – |
| 2012 | "Feeling" | Still Alive | Yes | G-Dragon | Yes | G-Dragon, Ridha Alexander |
| 2012 | "Bingle Bingle" | Still Alive | Yes | Teddy, G-Dragon | No | – |
| 2012 | "Ego" | Still Alive | Yes | G-Dragon | No | – |
| 2015 | "Loser" | Made | Yes | Teddy, G-Dragon | No | – |
| 2015 | "Bae Bae" | Made | Yes | Teddy, G-Dragon | Yes | Teddy, G-Dragon |
| 2015 | "Bang Bang Bang" | Made | Yes | Teddy, G-Dragon | No | – |
| 2015 | "We Like 2 Party" | Made | Yes | Teddy, Kush, G-Dragon | No | – |
| 2015 | "Sober" | Made | Yes | Teddy, G-Dragon | No | – |
| 2016 | "Fxxk It" | Made | Yes | Teddy, G-Dragon | No | – |
| 2016 | "Last Dance" | Made | Yes | Taeyang, G-Dragon | No | – |
| 2016 | "Girlfriend" | Made | Yes | Teddy, G-Dragon | No | – |
| 2018 | "Flower Road" | Non-album single | Yes | G-Dragon | No | – |
| 2022 | "Still Life" | Non-album single | Yes | Kush, G-Dragon | Yes | Vince, VVN, Kush, G-Dragon |

=== Other artists ===
List of songs, showing year released, and name of the album
| Year | Song | Artist | Album | Lyricist | | Composer | |
| Year | Song | Artist | Album | Credited | With | Credited | With |
|---|---|---|---|---|---|---|---|
| 2007 | "Superfly" | Lexy | Rush | Yes | Taeyang, G-Dragon, Daesung, Seungri, Lexy | No | – |
| 2008 | "D.I.S.C.O" | Uhm Jung-hwa | D.I.S.C.O | Yes | Teddy, Kush, Michael Denne, Ken Gold | Yes | Teddy, Kush, Michael Denne, Ken Gold |
| 2010 | "Digital Bounce" | Seven | Digital Bounce | Yes | P.K | No | – |
| 2010 | "High High" | GD & TOP | GD & TOP | Yes | Teddy, G-Dragon | No | – |
| 2010 | "Oh Yeah" (featuring Park Bom) | GD & TOP | GD & TOP | Yes | Teddy, G-Dragon | No | – |
| 2010 | "Intro" | GD & TOP | GD & TOP | Yes | G-Dragon | No | – |
| 2010 | "Baby Good Night" | GD & TOP | GD & TOP | Yes | G-Dragon | Yes | 1ON, E.Knock, G-Dragon |
| 2010 | "Knock Out" | GD & TOP | GD & TOP | Yes | G-Dragon | No | – |
| 2015 | "Zutter" | GD & TOP | GD & TOP | Yes | Teddy, G-Dragon | Yes | Teddy, G-Dragon |

== Music videos ==
| Year | Music video | Artist |
|---|---|---|
| 2007 | "Hello" | Red Roc feat. T.O.P |
| 2008 | "I'm Sorry" | Gummy feat. T.O.P |
| 2008 | "D.I.S.C.O" | Uhm Jung-hwa feat. T.O.P |
| 2010 | "Turn It Up" | Himself |
| 2013 | "Doom Dada" | Himself |
| 2026 | "Desperado" | Himself |
| 2026 | "Studio54" | Himself |

== See also ==
- Big Bang discography
- GD & TOP discography
