= Knock Out (GD & TOP song) =

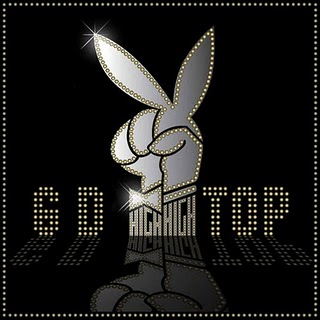

Single by GD & TOP

from the album GD & TOP
- Released: January 3, 2011
- Genre: Electropop; hip hop; hyphy
- Length: 3:27
- Label: YG Entertainment
- Songwriters: G-Dragon; T.O.P
- Producer: Diplo

GD & TOP singles chronology
"Oh Yeah" (2010)	"Knock Out" (2011)	"Zutter" (2015)

Music video
- "Knock Out" on YouTube

"Knock Out" is the final single recorded by South Korean duo GD & TOP (G-Dragon and T.O.P) for their self-titled album GD & TOP (2010). Released through YG Entertainment, it was serviced to radio on January 3, 2011. Upon its release, the song peaked in the top 5 of the Gaon Music Chart and drew controversies over its lyrics.

== Background ==
The song "Knock Out" was the final single from GD & TOP's self-entitled album, and have been described as a "club" song due to its production. It was censored from major television corporations (MBC, SBS, and KBS) for its lyrics, which were deemed to be too "vulgar and explicit" for youth. A request was issued for the duo to record a "cleaner" version of the song if they want to continue performing it; the duo rejected the request and decided to continue promoting with their previous singles, "High High" and "Oh Yeah" instead. In 2012, "High High" and "Knock Out" were listed as one of the best K-pop music videos of all time by Stereogum, ranking at fourth and seventh, respectively.

== Charts and sales ==
=== Weekly charts ===
Chart (2011)	Peak position
South Korea (Gaon Weekly Digital Chart)	5
US World Digital Songs (Billboard)	15

=== Sales ===
Chart	Sales
South Korea (Gaon Download Chart)	775,180
