= Fei Qinyuan =

Chinese idol singer (born 2001)

- 费沁源
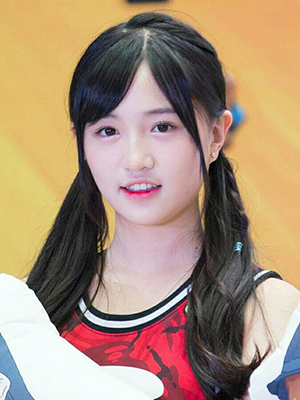
- Born: March 20, 2001 (age 25); Shanghai, China
- Occupations: Singer, actress
- Years active: 2015-present

Chinese name
- Traditional Chinese: 費沁源
- Simplified Chinese: 费沁源
Transcriptions
Standard Mandarin
- Hanyu Pinyin: Fèi Qìnyuán
- Musical career
- Origin: China
- Genres: Pop, Mandopop
- Instrument: Vocals
- Labels: Star48; Ninestyle Model Agency; Ninestyle Music

Fei Qinyuan (simplified Chinese: 费沁源; traditional Chinese: 費沁源; pinyin: Fèi Qìnyuán; born March 20, 2001, in Shanghai, China) is a Chinese idol singer and actress. She is a member of Team HII of Chinese idol group SNH48, as well as its sub-unit, Color Girls.

== Early life ==
Fei started learning archery and designing from a young age. She studied at Shanghai Dajing Junior High School Affiliated to SISU, where she started learning to play the ukulele.

== Career ==
On 25 July 2015, during SNH48's second General Election, Fei Qinyuan was announced as one of the fifth-generation members of SNH48. On 4 December, she made her first public performance during Team XII's first stage, "Theater no Megami", performing "Locker Room Boy" as a center member.

Since 10 January, Fei has starred in National Girl, and was made champion, however she pulled out on 17 March due to scheduling conflicts. On 5 April, she made her film debut by starring in Out of Control together with T.O.P and Cecilia Cheung, which is expected to be released in December 2016. On 30 July, during SNH48's third General Election, Fei was ranked 22nd with 20,137.9 votes.

On July 29, 2017, during SNH48's fourth General Election, Fei came in 40th with 20614.0 votes.

On February 3, 2018, during SNH48's fourth Request Time, Fei was transferred to Team HII following the disbandment of Team XII as part of the SNH48 Team Shuffle.

== Public image ==
On 28 January 2016, Fei was referred by Japanese media as a "beauty in 4000 years", a title that was previously given to Ju Jingyi. Many fans then also compared her to early-era Mayu Watanabe, due to her wearing Watanabe's signature "twin-tail" hairstyle.

== Discography ==
=== With SNH48 ===
==== EPs ====
Year	No.	Title	Role	Notes
2016	11	Engine of Youth	B-side	First original EP; With Team XII; Center
2016	12	Dream Land	B-side	Second original EP
2016	13	Princess's Cloak	A-side	Ranked 22nd in the 3rd General election Sang on "Romantic Melody" with Under Girls; Also sang on "It has to be you" with Team XII, center with Hong Peiyun
2016	14	Happy Wonder World	A-side	Also sang on "After the bell is a paradise" with Team XII, center
2017	15	Each Other's Future	B-side	Sang on "To All of You" with Team XII
2017	16	Summer Pirates	B-side	Sang on "Summer Color" with Team XII, center
2017	17	Dawn in Naples	B-side	Ranked 40th in the 4th General Election; Sang on "Memories with You & I" with Next Girls
2017	18	Sweet Festival	B-side	Sang on "Good Luck" with SNH48

=== With Color Girls ===
- 美少女时代 (2016)

== Units ==
=== SNH48 Stage Units ===
Stage No.	Song	Notes
Team XII 1st Stage "Theater no Megami"	Locker Room Boy 更衣室男孩	With Jiang Shan, Liu Zengyan, Pan Yingqi and Zhou Jiajia; A Lineup
Team XII 2nd Stage "Code XII"	The First Kiss Etudes 初吻练习曲	Center; With Zou Jiajia, Yu Jiayi and Zhang Wenjing

=== Concert units ===
Year	Date	Name	Song	Notes
2016	30 July	3rd General Election Concert	None	None
2017	7 January	Request Hour Setlist Best 50 (3rd Edition)	Tenshi no Shippo 天使的尾巴	With Jiang Shan and Zhang Yi

== Filmography ==
=== Films ===
Year	Title	Role	Notes
2017	Out of Control 失控·幽灵飞车	Tang Su 唐苏	
2020	巾帼风云	Lü Bu 吕布	

=== Dramas ===
Year	Title	Role	Notes
2016	Campus Beauty 贴身校花	瞿冰儿 Qu Bing'er	
2019	仙游记	Fairy rabbit 仙兔	
-	雪鹰领主	Kong You'yue 孔悠月	

=== Variety shows ===
Year	Date	Channel	Title	Notes
2016	10 January-13 March	Tudou, Youku	National Girl 国民美少女	
2016	1 July	Shenzhen Satellite Television	The Generation Show 年代秀	
2016	23 July	Hunan Television	Summer Sweetie 夏日甜心	
2017	18 May	Hunan Television	The Beauty of Chinese Civilization 中华文明之美	With Li Yitong and Sun Zhenni
2018	10 June	Anhui Television	Sweet Food Season 3 蜜食记第三季	
2018	13 December-31 January 2019	Anhui Television	Sweet Food Season 4 蜜食记第四季	
2019	16 February	Hunan Television	Happy Camp 快乐大本营	WithSun Zhenni, Xie Leilei and Su Shanshan
2019	23 June	Hunan Television	Day Day Up 天天向上	
2019	22 November-10 January 2020	Anhui Television	Sweet Food Season 5 蜜食记第五季	
2020	12 March-30 May	iQiyi	Youth With You (season 2) 青春有你 (第二季)	
2020	1 November	Anhui Television	Sweet Food Season 6 蜜食记第六季	
