= Let's Not Fall in Love =

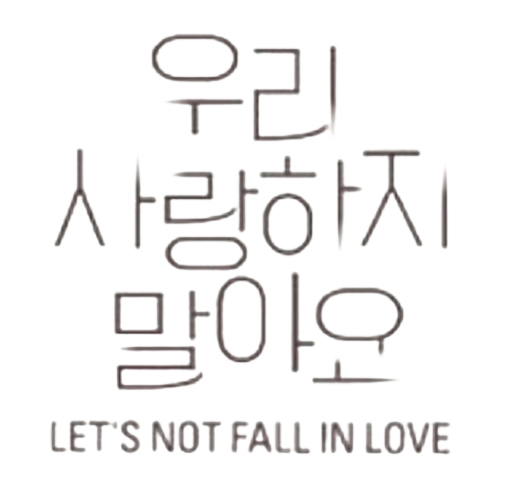

Single by BigBang

from the album Made
- Language: Korean
- A-side: "Zutter"
- Released: August 5, 2015
- Studio: YG (Seoul)
- Genre: Pop rock, rap rock
- Length: 3:32
- Label: YG
- Songwriters: Teddy Park; G-Dragon
- Producers: Teddy; G-Dragon

BigBang singles chronology
| "Zutter" (2015) | "Let's Not Fall in Love" (2015) | "Fxxk It" (2016) |

Music video
- "Let's Not Fall in Love" on YouTube

"Let's Not Fall in Love" (Korean: 우리 사랑하지 말아요; RR: Uri saranghaji marayo) is a song recorded by South Korean boy band BigBang. It was released through YG Entertainment on August 5, 2015, alongside the single "Zutter"; both tracks make up the single album E as part of the group's Made series. The recording was written and produced by long-time group collaborator Teddy Park and band member G-Dragon. Musically, the pop-rock infused dance track features a variety of vocal samplings, acoustic melodies, and hazy synths, while the lyrical content explores the subtle insecurities that come along with teenage love.

Following the release of "Let's Not Fall in Love", it was met with positive reviews from music critics, many of whom highlighted the track's unique and sentimental composition, and further praised the band's versatility with emotional and complex themes that are seldom seen in K-pop. A commercial success, the track topped both the Gaon Digital Chart as well as the US World Digital Songs and garnered nearly 1,400,000 downloads in South Korea by the end of 2016. The song's pastel-colored music video was released simultaneously with the release of E and depicts the band members in a hazily-lit school courtyard, each taking on the role of a boyfriend. Promotions for the single featured BigBang performing the song live on the music program Inkigayo along with their ongoing Made World Tour (2015–16).

== Composition and lyrical interpretation ==
Written and composed by member G-Dragon and Teddy Park, "Let's Not Fall in Love" is a pop-rock tune with a classic sentimental dance sound, that was compared to the group's early single "Blue". The track also features "a variety of vocal samplings, acoustic melodies, and hazy synths." The song was described as gentle and sweet unlike the previous releases from the band, having a solemn tone with a mid-tempo and gentle vocals with a sad mode.

The lyrics speak of a young, hesitant romance that is ultimately more self-centered and defensive than caring, capturing the subtle insecurities of teenage love. Billboard felt that the lyrical content of "Let's Not Fall in Love" encompasses "the scary moments that accompany the start of a relationship", depicting "the pressures and worries of starting a new relationship and committing to a person, and the potential pain that accompanies the risk of opening up to someone." The magazine concluded that the song gives a message "that if you like someone you still will want them to stay despite the fears."

== Critical reception ==
This song was well received by both the public and critics. Billboard said that "Let's Not Fall in Love" "showcases the boy band at their most sentimental", and has a classic BigBang song feel but with a unique sound because of the "lack of a definitive chorus and T.O.P and G-Dragon showing off new vocal colors instead of their usual personality-driven raps." The magazine chose the track as BigBang's fourth best song, praising the group versatility after nearly a decade on top. Korean website Osen complimented "Let's Not Fall in Love" for being "filled with joyful and fluttering emotions with a young and fresh beauty that was expressed based on a sorrowful emotion."

Fuse called the song "a gem" and praised its "lush production that evokes a range of emotions." Philippine Daily Inquirer admired the group, stating "while most K-pop boy groups safely opt for either the sweet, forever-giving boyfriend role or the dangerously attractive bad boy image, Big Bang continues to explore more complex themes while still maintaining popular appeal" and commented that BigBang "has struck a genuine and elusive emotional chord" with "Let's Not Fall in Love".

== Commercial performance ==
"Let's Not Fall in Love" sold 314,944 digital copies in its first week on the Gaon Chart, the fourth highest first week sales of 2015, and peaked at number one in both the Digital and Download charts. The song debuted at the third position on the Streaming Chart with over 4.797 million streams, the fourth on Mobile Chart and eleventh on BGM Chart. By the end of 2016, the song received nearly 1,400,000 digital downloads in South Korea.

The single charted first on Billboard's World Digital Songs chart, being it the group's third number one on the chart which made them the Korean act with the most songs that topped the World Digital Songs, along with Psy. In Taiwan, the song ranked fifth on the most popular Korean singles list of 2015 by music streaming service KKBOX.

== Music video ==
Acting as a complement of the lyrics, the music video highlights the happiness of falling in love through the use of bright colours, and fun and innocent depictions of dates, which is contradicted by the close up shots that emphasise the member's worried faces. While the under exposed and dreamy tone reflects the video as fragments of a memory. The pastel-colored, dreamlike video features the five members running around a hazily-lit school courtyard, each taking on the role of boyfriend to five different models. Ha Yeon-soo, Lauren Tse, Kim Yoon-hye, Seo Yea-ji, and Lee Ho-jung played the girlfriends of T.O.P, Taeyang, Daesung, G-Dragon, and Seungri, respectively.

== Accolades ==
BigBang received the Song of the Year – August award at the 5th Gaon Chart Music Awards for its success on digital platforms. It additionally achieved the top positions on several South Korean music programs during its promotion, including on Show! Music Core, Inkigayo, and Music Bank.

Music program awards
| Program | Date | Ref. |
|---|---|---|
| Show! Music Core | August 15, 2015 | |
| Show! Music Core | August 22, 2015 | |
| Inkigayo | August 16, 2015 | |
| Inkigayo | August 23, 2015 | |
| Music Bank | August 21, 2015 | |

== Charts ==
=== Weekly charts ===
Weekly chart performance for "Let's Not Fall in Love"
| Chart (2015) | Peak position |
|---|---|
| South Korea (Gaon) | 1 |
| US World Digital Songs (Billboard) | 1 |

=== Monthly charts ===
Monthly chart performance for "Let's Not Fall in Love"
| Chart (August 2015) | Peak position |
|---|---|
| South Korea (Gaon) | 1 |

=== Year-end charts ===
Year-end chart performance for "Let's Not Fall in Love"
| Chart (2015) | Position |
|---|---|
| South Korea (Gaon) | 33 |
| US World Digital Songs (Billboard) | 18 |

== Release history ==
Release history and formats for "Let's Not Fall in Love"
| Region | Date | Format | Label |
|---|---|---|---|
| South Korea | August 5, 2015 | Digital download | YG Entertainment, KT Music |
| Various | August 5, 2015 | Digital download | YG Entertainment, KT Music |
| Japan | August 12, 2015 | Digital download | YG Entertainment, YGEX |
