= Turn It Up (T.O.P song) =

Single by T.O.P
- Released: June 21, 2010
- Recorded: 2010
- Genre: K-pop; hip hop
- Length: 3:32
- Label: YG
- Songwriter: T.O.P
- Producers: Teddy; T.O.P

T.O.P singles chronology
"Turn It Up" (2010)	"Doom Dada" (2013)

Music video
- "Turn It Up" on YouTube

"Turn It Up" (Korean: 턴 잇 업) is a song recorded by the South Korean rapper T.O.P. It was released digitally on June 21, 2010, by YG Entertainment. The song was released as his first official single and was later included as bonus track on the albums: 2010 Big Show Live Album (2010), fourth live album of his group Big Bang and GD & TOP (2010), first studio album of his hip hop duo GD & TOP.

== Background and release ==
"Turn It Up" has become public for the first time during BigBang's 2010 Big Show concert in January 2010. The song was released as a digital single on June 21, as part of the release of 2010 Big Show Live Album. On Gaon Chart "Turn It Up" peaked at number one in Download Chart, selling 1,380 million digital downloads in 2010. Within 24 hours the song achieved the highest international debut for a Korean Hip-Hop/rap single on iTunes Charts on the Hip-Hop/Rap category.

== Music video ==
On June 14, 2010, a teaser of the music video was released on the YG Entertainment channel on YouTube. His video was officially released June 21, along with the digital single. Later, the video was banned from MBC, because T.O.P mentions brand names, which is against MBC's broadcasting rules.

== Track listing ==
Digital single
No.	Title	Lyrics	Music	Arrangement	Length
1.	"Turn It Up"	T.O.P	Teddy; T.O.P	Teddy	3:32
Total length:					3:32

== Chart performance ==
=== Weekly charts ===
Chart (2010)	Peak position
South Korea (Gaon Weekly Digital Chart)	2
South Korea (Gaon Weekly Download Chart)	1
South Korea (Gaon Weekly Streaming Chart)	3
South Korea (Gaon BGM Weekly Chart)	3

=== Year-end charts ===
Chart (2010)	Position
South Korea (Gaon Yearly Digital Chart)	110

=== Sales ===
Chart	Sales
Gaon Download Chart 2010	1,380,732
