= Commitment (2013 film) =

- Hangul: 동창생
- Hanja: 同窓生
- Lit.: Alumnus; Graduate
- RR: Dongchangsaeng
- MR: Tongch'angsaeng
- Directed by: Park Hong-soo
- Written by: Kim Soo-young
- Produced by: Park Eun-gyeong; Lee Deok-jae; Lee Seong-hun; Choe Ji-yun
- Starring: Choi Seung-hyun; Han Ye-ri; Yoon Je-moon; Jo Sung-ha; Kim You-jung
- Cinematography: Kim Gi-tae
- Edited by: Kim Sang-bum; Kim Jae-bum
- Music by: Noh Hyeong-woo
- Distributed by: Showbox/Mediaplex (South Korea); Well Go USA Entertainment (United States)
- Release dates: November 6, 2013 (South Korea); December 6, 2013 (United States)
- Running time: 113 minutes
- Country: South Korea
- Language: Korean
- Box office: US$6,834,802

Commitment (Korean: 동창생; RR: Dongchangsaeng; lit. 'Alumnus; Graduate') is a 2013 South Korean action drama film starring Choi Seung-hyun, Han Ye-ri, Yoon Je-moon, Jo Sung-ha and Kim You-jung. He plays the teenage son of an ex-North Korean agent who is tasked to kill a North Korean assassin in South Korea in order to save his younger sister.

The film is about third generation Koreans since the division of the peninsula and the Korean War, historical events that the teenage characters did not directly experience, but nevertheless, change their lives and destinies.

== Plot ==
Nineteen-year-old Li Myung-hoon (Choi Seung-hyun) never imagined he would become a killer. Born to a privileged life in North Korea, his dream was to become a pianist. But when his father, a North Korean spy, dies disgraced, Myung-hoon and his younger sister Hye-in (Kim You-jung) are sent to a "guilt-by-association" forced labor camp. Their father's superior, high-ranking military official Colonel Moon (Jo Sung-ha) proposes a deal to Myung-hoon: if he goes down to the South as a "technician" (an assassin) and finishes what his father had failed to accomplish, he and his sister will be released from the prison camp. Myung-hoon accepts the deal and undergoes two years of intense training.

Myung-hoon finally arrives in South Korea under the guise of a North Korean defector. He is adopted by a South Korean couple who are actually North Korean spies and enrolls at a local high school. He gradually befriends Hye-in (Han Ye-ri), a bullied schoolgirl who shares the same name as his sister and has aspirations of becoming a professional dancer. Myung-hoon then receives his mission: in order to rescue his sister and go back home to the North, he must locate and take out "Big Dipper" (Jung Ho-bin), a North Korean agent working for the opposing government faction. Meanwhile, a power struggle ensues in North Korea with the failing health of dictator Kim Jong Il, and Myung-hoon quickly becomes a liability and must ultimately cope with Colonel Moon's treachery.

== Cast ==
- Choi Seung-hyun – Li Myung-hoon / Kang Dae-ho (cover identity used in South Korea)
- Han Ye-ri – Lee Hye-in, South Korean highschooler who fall in love with him without knowing his real identity.
- Yoon Je-moon – Cha Jung-min, South Korean National Intelligence Service agent
- Jo Sung-ha – Moon Sang-chul, North Korean senior colonel
- Kim You-jung – Li Hye-in, Myung-hoon's younger sister
- Jung Ho-bin – "Big Dipper," North Korean agent
- Kwak Min-seok – North Korean agent, Myung-hoon's adoptive father in South Korea
- Kim Sun-kyung – North Korean agent, Myung-hoon's adoptive mother in South Korea; cover identity as pharmacist
- Dong Hyun-bae – one of the bullies
- Kim Min-jae – North Korean agent
- Lee Joo-shil – North Korean agent
- Park Ji-il – South Korean agent
- Kang Bit
- Park Sung-woong – Li Young-ho

Myung-hoon and Hye-in's father

- Dong Hyun-bae – as the troubled kid's friend
- Yoo Jae-myung – Kim Sun-myung

Head of Recon Bureau Unit 8. "Defected" in 1992.

== Release ==
The film was released in South Korea on November 6, 2013, opening at number 2 in the box office. On its opening weekend, it sold 689,600 tickets, grossing US$2,859,921. In total, Commitment grossed US$6,512,794 with 1,048,254 tickets sold nationwide.

Following its pre-sales deal to seven Asian countries (Japan, Singapore, Thailand, Vietnam, Taiwan, Hong Kong, Malaysia and Indonesia), distribution company Well Go USA acquired the North American rights to the film and gave it a limited theatrical release on December 6, 2013. Commitment played in a total of 22 theaters and grossed US$60,317 on its opening weekend. In total, the film grossed US$76,543 during its North American run.

European distributor Splendid Film also released Commitment as Silent Assassin in German-speaking territories in 2014.
