= Digital Bounce =

EP by Seven
- Released: July 21, 2010
- Recorded: 2010
- Genres: Electronic dance, R&B, pop
- Length: 22:25
- Label: YG Entertainment
- Producers: Teddy Park, Choi Pil Gang, DP, Ham Seung Cheon, Kang Uk Jin, Walt Anderson

Seven chronology
Sevolution (2006)	Digital Bounce (2010)	2nd Mini Album (2012)

Singles from Digital Bounce
- 1. "Better Together" Released: July 21, 2010; 2. "I'm Going Crazy" Released: September 28, 2010

Digital Bounce is the first mini-album by South Korean recording artist Seven. It was released in South Korea on July 21, 2010, under YG Entertainment. After releasing his fourth studio album Sevolution in 2006, Seven spent the next three years working on entering the American music market. After the unsuccessful stint, he returned to South Korea and began recording songs for Digital Bounce. The album features a heavier presence of electronic dance music than Seven's previous albums, but still incorporates his signature R&B and pop sound.

Digital Bounce was released after Seven's three-year and eight-month hiatus. The album went on to debut on Gaon's weekly albums chart at number two. The album's lead single "Better Together" peaked at number five on Gaon's weekly singles chart and earned Seven two consecutive wins on Mnet's music chart television program M! Countdown. "I'm Going Crazy", the second single released from the album, peaked at number 33 on the weekly singles chart. In South Korea, Digital Bounce sold over 24,600 copies in 2010.

== Background ==
After releasing his fourth studio album Sevolution in November 2006, Seven began preparing to enter the American music market in 2007 with English-language music. After spending three years promoting in the United States, resulting in inconclusive results in regards to his music there and becoming homesick, Seven returned to South Korea. The language barrier, as well as the lack of proper music and marketing, is believed to have led to Seven's failure in the United States.

During his absence in South Korea, label-mates Big Bang and 2NE1, among other groups, emerged into the music market. As a result, the presence of soloists began to shrink. Facing this, Seven expressed his eagerness to return, stating that he was "ready to restart with a fresh mind".

== Composition ==
Digital Bounce features music similar to his previous work, but with a "touch of his own color"; Seven expressed that the songs may sound "somewhat unfamiliar" to his fans. The album incorporates electronic dance and R&B music, with a "hip hop twist". "Digital Bounce", which features rapper T.O.P of Big Bang, was described as an electronic club song. The lead single, "Better Together", also featured electronic sounds; his vocals and production of the track were commended. "I'm Going Crazy" is a medium-tempo song based on R&B and pop, similar to the sound of his earlier music. "Money Can't Buy Me Love" is the only English-language song on the album. "Drips", a song about intimacy, was banned by the Ministry of Gender Equality and Family for "sexually suggestive" lyrics. As a result, the song was tagged with an R19 label on digital music retailers, restricting minors from purchasing the song. Kang Seon-ae, writer for MyDaily, felt that the album's "sophisticated melodies" helped build a unique music genre.

== Release and promotion ==
After a hiatus lasting over three years since the release of his previous album Sevolution, it was announced that Seven had completed recording an album in May 2010. The album was originally planned to be released in the month of its announcement, but was pushed back to July. On July 13, 2010, a music video teaser and the track listing for Digital Bounce were revealed. On July 20, 2010, Seven held a release party and press conference for Digital Bounce in the Cheongdam-dong area of Seoul, South Korea. An estimate of 350 fans were in attendance. Digital Bounce was released the following day.

The dance practice video for "Digital Bounce" was released on July 27, 2010. The video showed Seven along with six male backup dancers rehearsing the choreography. On July 29, 2010, Seven began promoting "Better Together" by performing the song, as well as "Digital Bounce" with T.O.P, on Mnet's M! Countdown. Seven also made his comeback performances in the following days on Munhwa Broadcasting Corporation's (MBC) Show! Music Core and Seoul Broadcasting System's (SBS) Inkigayo.

On July 29, 2010, "Better Together" earned its first K-Chart win on M! Countdown. Seven won a second time on August 5. The legitimacy of Seven's second win was brought in question when netizens pointed out that, based on the program's charting system, Seven should have ranked at number nine that week, not number one. They claimed that the close affiliation between YG Entertainment and Mnet may have led M! Countdown to manipulate its chart in favor of Seven.

Seven began follow-up promotions with "I'm Going Crazy" in late September. The music video for the song was released on September 29, 2010, which featured a cameo by his long-term girlfriend, Park Han-byul. He began promoting the song on September 30, 2010, on M! Countdown, followed by performances on Show! Music Core and Inkigayo.

== Commercial performance ==
With three charting days, Digital Bounce debuted at number four on Gaon's monthly album chart for the month July. The album went on to debut at number two on Gaon's weekly album chart. It also charted at number 20 for the month of August, number 81 for the month of September, and number 93 for the month of December. With 24,604 copies sold in South Korean in 2010, Digital Bounce was ranked at number 62 on Gaon's year-end albums chart.

After three charting days, "Better Together" debuted at number 27 on Gaon's monthly singles chart for the month of July 2010. It debuted at number 14 on the Gaon's weekly singles chart. The following week, the song rose nine spots to its peak at number five, where it remained for one week before falling five spots to number ten. For the month of August, "Better Together" charted at number 11 on Gaon's monthly singles chart, and at number 43 for the month of September. The follow-up single, "I'm Going Crazy", debuted at number 75 on Gaon's weekly singles chart. It charted for two weeks before falling out of the top 100, and re-entered the chart nine weeks later at number 48. The following week, it rose to its peak at number 33, where it remained for one week before falling to number 65. The song charted at number 71 on Gaon's monthly singles chart for the month of October.

== Track listing ==
No.	Title	Lyrics	Music	Length
1.	"Reset (Intro)"	Big Tone	Big Tone, P.K	0:55
2.	"Digital Bounce" (feat. T.O.P)	P.K, T.O.P	P.K	3:29
3.	"Better Together"	Teddy	Teddy	3:38
4.	"I'm Going Crazy"	Teddy	Teddy	3:43
5.	"Money Can't Buy Me Love"	Walt Anderson	Teddy, Walt Anderson	3:45
6.	"Drips"	Big Tone, P.K	Big Tone	3:22
7.	"Roller Coaster"	Ham Seung-cheon, Kang Uk-jin	Ham Seung-cheon, Kang Uk-jin	3:33
Total length:				20:56

== Chart history ==
Chart (2010)	Peak position
South Korean Gaon album chart	2
South Korean Gaon domestic album chart	2
