= Oh Yeah (GD & TOP song) =

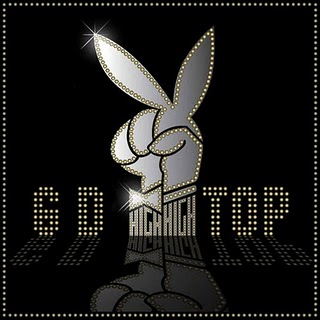

Single by GD & TOP featuring Park Bom

from the album GD & TOP
- Released: December 15, 2010
- Genre: Electropop; hip hop
- Length: 3:08
- Label: YG Entertainment
- Songwriters: Kwon Ji-yong; Choi Seung-hyun; Park Hong-jun
- Producer: Teddy

GD & TOP singles chronology
"High High" (2010)	"Oh Yeah" (2010)	"Knock Out" (2011)

Park Bom singles chronology
"You & I" (2009)	"Oh Yeah" (2010)	"Don't Cry" (2011)

Music video
- "Oh Yeah" (Japanese ver.) on YouTube

"Oh Yeah" is the second single recorded by South Korean duo GD & TOP (G-Dragon and T.O.P) for their self-titled album GD & TOP (2010). It features their then YG Entertainment label-mate Park Bom. The song was released alongside "High High" on December 15, 2010 through YG Entertainment. The song was a commercial success, peaking at the No. 2 position on the Gaon Music Chart, becoming the duo's highest peak on the chart, and selling over a million copies.

== Background ==
In an attempt to create their own style separate from their band, BigBang, the duo opted for a more hip-hop sound as GD & TOP to contrast the group's current genre of electronic music. Released simultaneously with "High High," "Oh Yeah" has been described as a "club song" due to its "beat drop". Bom's vocal was also praised. The duo have explained that "Oh Yeah" lyrically explores the theme of freedom. A Japanese version was released the following year, along with a music video.

== Chart performance ==
Chart (2015)	Peak position
South Korea (Gaon)	2

== Sales ==
Country	Sales
South Korea	1,380,732

== Music program awards ==
Song	Program	Date
"Oh Yeah" (featuring Park Bom)	M! Countdown (Mnet)	December 30, 2010
