= Another Dimension (T.O.P album) =

Studio album by T.O.P
- Released: April 3, 2026
- Length: 36:57
- Languages: Korean; English
- Labels: Topspot Pictures; Kakao
- Producers: T.O.P; Bcalm; Jackpot

T.O.P chronology
Doom Dada (2013)	Another Dimension (2026)

Singles from Another Dimension
- 1. "Studio54" Released: April 3, 2026; 2. "Desperado" Released: April 3, 2026

Another Dimension (Korean: 다중관점; RR: Dajunggwanjeom), also known as Top Spot – Another Dimension, is the debut studio album by South Korean rapper and musician T.O.P, released on April 3, 2026, by Topspot Pictures. The album marks T.O.P's first musical release since his 2013 single "Doom Dada" and his first musical project after departing from the K-pop band BigBang in 2023.

== Background ==
T.O.P debuted in 2006 under BigBang as a lead rapper of the K-pop group. After years of hiatus, he reemerged as an actor portraying Thanos in the Squid Game series.

He announced in June 2025 that he would be releasing a new album. In January 2026, T.O.P released teasers on his Instagram account. In March, his agency, Topspot Pictures, announced that the album would be releasing on April 3. The album cover was revealed on March 23 which was designed by Edward Ruscha. On March 27, the tracklist released, showing 11 tracks on the album. T.O.P confirmed that the album was mixed in part by Grammy Award-winning audio engineer Irko.

== Track listing ==
Another Dimension track listing
No.	Title	Lyrics	Music	Arrangement	Length
1.	"Self Crucifixion" (탑욕)	T.O.P	T.O.P; Jackpot; Archie Thompson		3:27
2.	"The Giant" (나만이)	T.O.P	T.O.P; Jackpot		3:48
3.	"Studio54" (완전미쳤어!)	T.O.P; Kim English; Frankie Feliciano	T.O.P; Jackpot; Holiship; English; Feliciano		3:32
4.	"A Small, Filthy Show Window"	T.O.P	T.O.P; Bcalm; Jackpot		3:13
5.	"Zero-Coke"	T.O.P	T.O.P; Jackpot		3:02
6.	"Another Dimension Holy Dude !!!!!!!!"	T.O.P	T.O.P; Jackpot; Maxwell Perla		3:28
7.	"Seoul Chaos" (서울시에 사는 기분)	T.O.P	T.O.P; Bcalm; Jackpot	T.O.P; Bcalm; Jackpot	3:04
8.	"Desperado"	T.O.P	T.O.P; Bcalm; Jackpot		3:04
9.	"For Fans" (꼬깔코온)	T.O.P	T.O.P; Jackpot; 2		3:14
10.	"Stendhal Syndrome" (연극이 끝나고 난 뒤)	T.O.P	T.O.P; Jackpot		3:35
11.	"Be Solid"	T.O.P	T.O.P; Jackpot		3:30
Total length:					36:57

== Charts ==
=== Weekly charts ===
Weekly chart performance for Another Dimension
Chart (2026)	Peak position
Japanese Digital Albums (Oricon)	21
Japanese Download Albums (Billboard Japan)	16
South Korean Albums (Circle)	7
US World Albums (Billboard)	20

=== Monthly charts ===
Monthly chart performance for Another Dimension
Chart (2026)	Peak position
South Korean Albums (Circle)	25
