= Zutter (song) =

Single by GD & TOP

from the album Made
- Language: Korean
- A-side: "Let's Not Fall in Love"
- Released: August 5, 2015
- Studio: YG (Seoul)
- Genre: K-hip hop; trap
- Length: 3:14
- Label: YG
- Songwriters: G-Dragon, Teddy Park, T.O.P.
- Producers: Teddy, G-Dragon, T.O.P

G-Dragon singles chronology
"Dirty Vibe" (2014)	"Zutter" (2015)	"Palette" (2017)

T.O.P. singles chronology
"Doom Dada" (2013)	"Zutter" (2015)	"Hi Haruka" (2015)

Big Bang singles chronology
"Sober" (2015)	"Zutter" (2015)	"Let's Not Fall in Love" (2015)

Music video
- "Zutter" on YouTube

"Zutter" (Korean: 쩔어; RR: Jjeoreo, lit. "Dope") is a song by South Korean band Big Bang, sung by the duo of members GD & TOP (G-Dragon and T.O.P.). It was released as a digital single alongside "Let's Not Fall in Love" on August 5, 2015 through YG Entertainment, in conjunction with the single album E. The single was later added as the seventh track for the band's third Korean-language studio album Made, which was released on December 12, 2016.

== Background ==
A single including the sub-unit GD&TOP was announced on July 24, with the teaser image being released the next day. "Zutter" marks the first release of the duo in four years, since the album GD & TOP.

G-Dragon stated that he had a difficult time written the rap lyrics of "Zutter", saying "I've written rap lyrics for a long time, but these days, I keep going over them again. Because rap lyrics have become a topic of controversy on a certain show, I look over each line again and again." Seungri said that the Korean survival competition show Show Me the Money 4 made G-Dragon go over the lyrics many times.

On August 12, "Zutter" was banned from KBS due to the content of the song and coarse language in the lyrics and title. YG Entertainment responded, announcing that there would be no revisions to the song, "In order to maintain the meaning of the song, we have no plans to change the lyrics of Zutter."

== Composition ==
Written and composed by the duo along with Teddy Park, "Zutter" is a hip-hop song with a trap-driven melody. Billboard described the track as "minimal, hip-hop cut peppered with trappy snares, knocking percussion and woozy synths to emphasize both dudes' distinctive spitting styles." Philippine Daily Inquirer noted that the lyrics explore "the unapologetic dissipation of the 'thug life,' and the swaggering self-praise typical to hip-hop — but with a tone of self-ridicule."

== Reception ==
Kpop Starz hailed "Zutter" as "arguably the group's most blazing and edgy single to date". Billboard said that the song was a "natural progression from their earlier tracks as a duo", and added that the single and the music video "showed just how bizarre the pair can actually be." Philippine Daily Inquirer felt that the song "suggests that GD & TOP are not in reverence of themselves, but are aware they are participating in a time-worn hip-hop tradition of unreasoning self-assertion and the debauchery that follows success." Osen described "Zutter" as "wild and stylish" with a "unique flow and rap with full beat [sic] catch the ears of listeners".

"Zutter" sold 280,817 digital copies in its first week on the Gaon Chart and peaked at number two in the Digital and Download charts, only behind the group's other single "Let's Not Fall In Love." It also debuted at number seven on the Streaming Chart, with over 4.334 million streams, 19th on BGM Chart and 32nd on Mobile Chart. On the second week the song dropped to number four on Digital Chart but raised to a peak position of number two on Streaming Chart with 5.210 million streams and 116,572 downloads sold. By the end of 2015, "Zutter" sold 823,317 digital units in South Korea, and ranked number 63 on the year-end Gaon Download Chart.

The single peaked at the second position on Billboard World Digital Songs. "Zutter" ranked at 16 on the most popular Korean singles of 2015 in Taiwan by music streaming service KKBOX.

== Charts ==
=== Weekly charts ===
Weekly chart performance for "Zutter"
Chart (2015)	Peak position
Finland Download (Latauslista)	30
South Korea (Gaon)	2
UK Indie Breakers (OCC)	15
US World Digital Song Sales (Billboard)	2

=== Monthly charts ===
Monthly chart performance for "Zutter"
Chart (August 2015)	Peak position
South Korea (Gaon)	4

=== Year-end charts ===
Year-end chart performance for "Zutter"
Chart (2015)	Position
South Korea (Gaon)	66
US World Digital Song Sales (Billboard)	24

== Release history ==
Release history and formats for "Zutter"
Region	Date	Format	Label
South Korea	August 5, 2015	Digital download	YG Entertainment, KT Music
Various	August 5, 2015	Digital download	YG Entertainment, KT Music
Japan	August 12, 2015	Digital download	YG Entertainment, YGEX
