= Spring (single album) =

Single album by Park Bom
- Released: March 13, 2019
- Recorded: 2018–2019
- Genre: K-pop; R&B
- Label: D-Nation
- Producer: Brave Brothers; Red Cookie.Charcoal; Two Champ

Alternative cover
- re: BLUE ROSE

Singles from Spring
- 1. "Spring" Released: March 13, 2019; 2. "4:44" Released: May 2, 2019

Music video
- "Spring feat. Sandara Park (봄)" on YouTube

Music video
- "4:44 feat. Wheein (4시 44분)" on YouTube

Spring is the debut single album by South Korean singer Park Bom. It was released on March 13, 2019, by D-Nation, alongside the lead single of the same name with the premiere of its music video. "Spring" was produced by Brave Brothers and was described as an "R&B song of medium tempo". Additionally, the song features vocals from Park's former group-mate Sandara Park. Spring was re-released as an extended play titled re:Blue Rose on May 2, 2019. The lead single, titled "4:44", was produced by Brave Brothers once again and featured vocals from Mamamoo's Wheein.

== Live performances ==
The title song "Spring" was performed for the first time during Spring's showcase event, which was held on the same day of its release.

== Commercial performance ==
"Spring" debuted at number two on Billboard's World Digital Song Sales chart as highest-selling K-pop song and highest-charting new entry of that week.

== Track listing ==
Credits adapted from Tidal.

No.	Title	Lyrics	Music	Length
1.	"Spring" (봄 feat. Sandara Park)	Brave Brothers, Red Cookie, Charcoal	Brave Brothers, Charcoal	4:03
2.	"My lover"	Red Cookie, Brave Brothers, Charcoal	Brave Brothers, Charcoal	3:26
3.	"Shameful"	Brave Brothers, Two Champ	Brave Brothers, Two Champ	3:33
Total length:				11:02

re:BLUE ROSE
No.	Title	Lyrics	Music	Length
1.	"4:44" (4시 44분 feat. Wheein)	Red Cookie, Brave Brothers	Mabus, Brave Brothers	3:44
2.	"Spring (Reggae Version)" (feat. Sandara Park)	Red Cookie, Brave Brothers, Charcoal	Brave Brothers, Charcoal	3:42
3.	"My lover"	Red Cookie, Brave Brothers, Charcoal	Brave Brothers, Charcoal	3:26
4.	"Shameful"	Brave Brothers, Two Champ	Brave Brothers, Two Champ	3:33
5.	"Spring (Ballad Version)" (feat. Park Goeun)	Red Cookie, Brave Brothers, Charcoal	Brave Brothers, Charcoal	4:35
Total length:				19:00

== Charts ==
Chart (2019)	Peak position
South Korean Albums (Gaon)	2

=== Singles ===
"Spring (봄)"

Chart (2019)	Peak position
New Zealand Hot Singles (RMNZ)	39
South Korea (Gaon)	3
South Korea (Kpop Hot 100)	4
US World Digital Song Sales (Billboard)	2

==== Year-end charts ====
Chart (2019)	Position
South Korea (Gaon)	80

"4:44 (4시 44분)"

Chart (2019)	Peak position
South Korea (Gaon)	84
South Korea (Kpop Hot 100)	78

== Awards and nominations ==
Year	Award	Category	Nominated work	Result	Ref.
2019	Mnet Asian Music Awards	Song of the Year	"Spring"	Nominated	
2019	Mnet Asian Music Awards	Best Vocal Performance (Solo)	"Spring"	Nominated	
2019	Melon Music Awards	Best R&B/Soul	"Spring"	Nominated	
2020	Gaon Chart Music Awards	Song of the Year (March)	"Spring"	Nominated	
2020	Seoul Music Awards	R&B/Hip Hop Award	"Spring"	Nominated	
