= Out of Control (2017 film) =

2017 film directed by Axel Sand

- Poster
- Chinese: 失控·幽灵飞车
- Directed by: Axel SandImdB; Richard Lin
- Screenplay by: Andreas Heckmann
- Produced by: Wilson Qiu; Hermann Joha; Jing Su; Stefan Retzbach
- Starring: Choi Seung-hyun; Cecilia Cheung; Michael Trevino; Steve Windolf; Jonas Berg; Angelina Fei
- Cinematography: Felix Poplawsky
- Edited by: Martin Habig
- Music by: Kay Skerra
- Production companies: Dreams of Dragons Pictures; Action Concept
- Distributed by: Huaxia Film Distribution (China)
- Release date: 1 October 2017 (Film Festival Cologne)
- Countries: Germany; China
- Language: Mandarin

Out of Control is a 2017 German-Chinese action thriller film directed by Axel Sand and Richard Lin and starring Choi Seung-hyun and Cecilia Cheung.

== Plot ==
Chinese actress and martial arts expert Lucy Lin (played by Cheung) attends the Berlin Film Festival, only to encounter the last person she wants to see—her ex-fiancé, Interpol agent Tom Young (played by T.O.P). Tom is on the hunt for cyber-criminal Kayser (Michael Trevino), who is planning a devastating attack. Using a software virus, Kayser seizes control of thirty stretch limousines, including the one carrying Lucy and her manager. A high-stakes chase across Germany ensues, forcing Lucy to place her trust in the very man who abandoned her at the altar without a word.

== Cast ==
- Cecilia Cheung as Lucy Lin
- T.O.P as Tom Young
- Michael Trevino as Bennet Kayser
- Steve Windolf as Francoise Lazard
- Angelina Fei as Tang Su
- Joseph Zeng as Bobby Fang
- Götz Burger as Chauffeur Schmidt
- Marko Dyrlich as Roland Bail
- David Cheung as Charlie
- Martin Umbach as Chief Karsten Bergmann

== Production ==
The film was produced by Dreams of Dragons Pictures (China) and Action Concept (Germany). Principal photography took place in Germany from February to May 2016.

== Release ==
The film premiered at Film Festival Cologne on 1 October 2017 in Cologne, Germany.
