= Park Bom =

South Korean singer (born 1984)

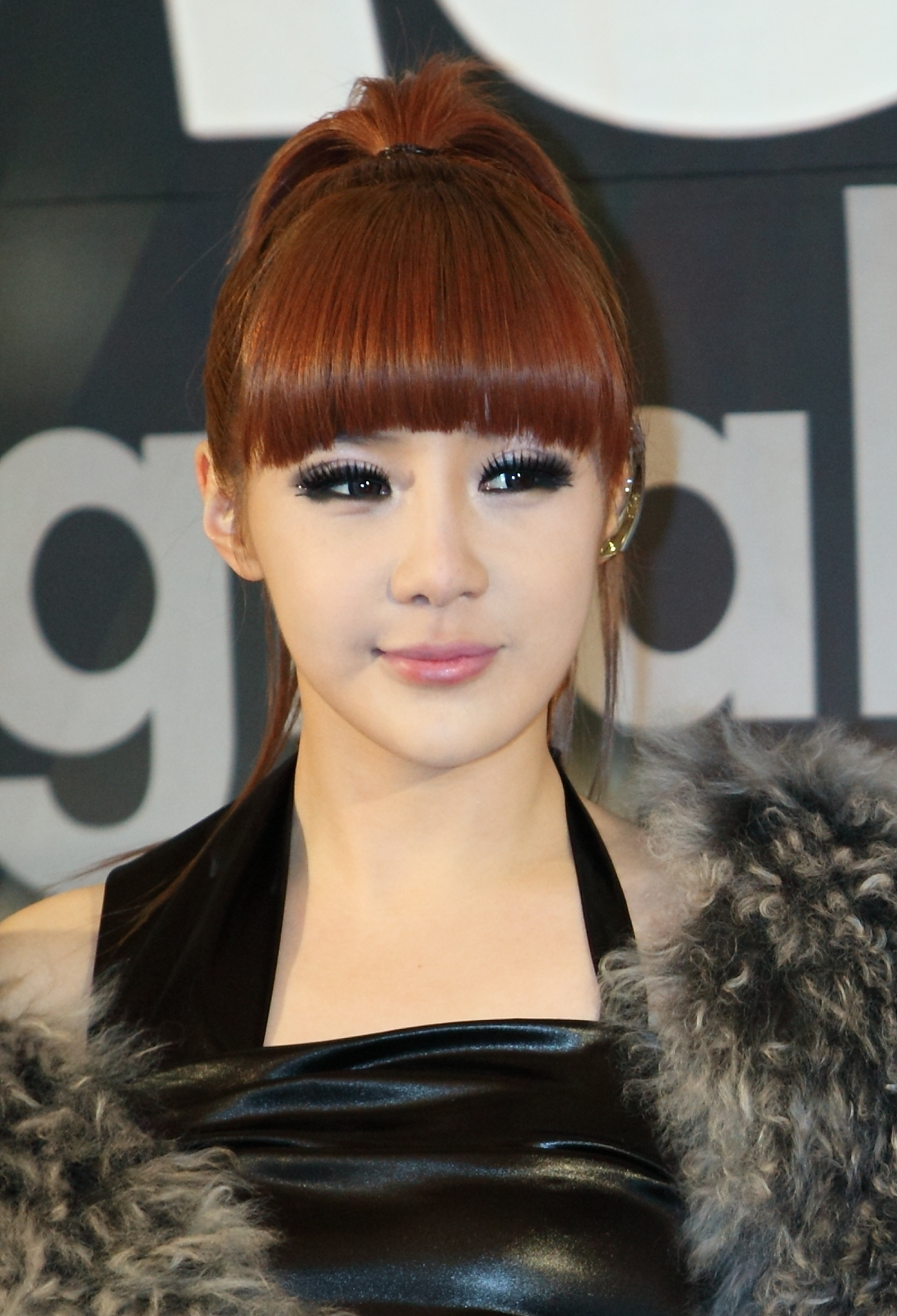
- Park in 2010
- Born: March 24, 1984 (age 42); Seoul, South Korea
- Education: Berklee College of Music
- Occupation: Singer
- Musical career
- Genres: K-pop; R&B
- Instrument: Vocals
- Years active: 2006–present
- Labels: YG; D-Nation; The Black Label
- Member of: 2NE1
- Formerly of: Bom & Hi

Korean name
- Hangul: 박봄
- Hanja: 朴봄
- RR: Bak Bom
- MR: Pak Pom

Signature
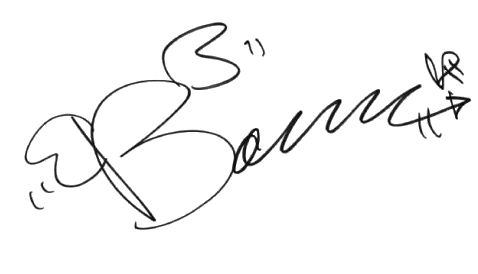

Park Bom (born March 24, 1984) is a South Korean singer. She is best known as a member of the South Korean girl group 2NE1, which became one of the most popular South Korean girl groups worldwide.

Park began her musical career in 2006 under YG Entertainment, featuring on singles released by label-mates Big Bang, Lexy, and Masta Wu. In 2009, she made her debut as the main vocalist of 2NE1. Under YG Entertainment, Park released two solo singles, "You and I" (2009) and "Don't Cry" (2011), which reached number one on the Gaon Digital Chart, the national music chart of South Korea. She was awarded Best Digital Single at the 2010 Mnet Asian Music Awards.

Following 2NE1's disbandment in 2016, Park left her group's agency, YG Entertainment, in November 2016. In July 2018, she signed with D-Nation Entertainment and released her comeback single, "Spring", in March 2019. After that, in May 2019, Park Bom released her new repackaged album re: Blue Rose, with the single "4:44" featuring Wheein from Mamamoo. Park has further released digital singles including "Do Re Mi Fa Sol" featuring Changmo and "Flower" featuring Kim Min-Seok. In 2023, Park held her first solo concert, "You & I" and released digital single, "I" featuring Dawn.

== Early life ==
Park Bom was born in Seoul, South Korea, on March 24, 1984. Her older sister, Park Go-eun, is a cellist. Whilst attending junior high school in the United States, she was diagnosed with attention-deficit hyperactivity disorder (ADHD). Park attended Lesley University in Cambridge, Massachusetts where she majored in psychology, before transferring to the Berklee College of Music to follow her dream of becoming a singer. She graduated from Berklee in 2008.

== Career ==
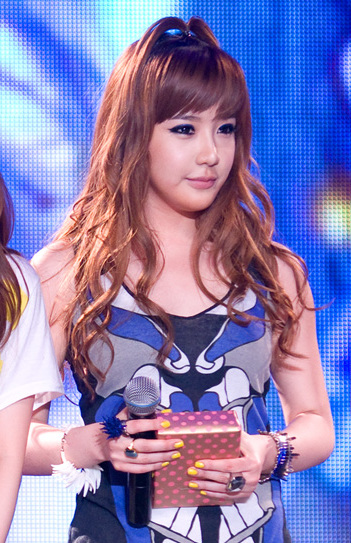
Park in 2009

=== 2006–2009: Career beginnings and breakthrough ===
Park returned to South Korea to pursue a music career there and repeatedly auditioned to join YG Entertainment, where she was accepted into the company in 2006 after three years of auditioning according to former YG executive and recording producer Yang Hyun-suk. During her time as a trainee, Park was diagnosed with lymphadenitis; Park has continued to suffer from episodes of lymphadenitis ever since. In 2006, she featured on two of Big Bang's earliest singles, "We Belong Together" and "Forever with U". Park also collaborated with Lexy on "Baby Boy" from her third extended play Rush, and Red Roc on the single "Along My Way". She has also appeared in a series of promotional music videos for Samsung Anycall of the same name, alongside Lee Hyori, G-Dragon, and Gummy.

=== 2009–2013: Breakthrough with 2NE1, You and I and Don't Cry ===
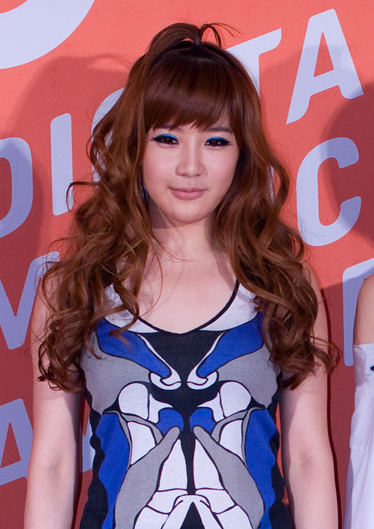
Park in August 2009

Park in March 2012

In 2009, Park was placed as the main vocalist of 2NE1, alongside CL, Dara, and Minzy. The group then collaborated with label-mates Big Bang for the song "Lollipop" before officially debuting on SBS's The Music Trend on May 17, 2009, where they performed their debut single, "Fire". The group achieved significant success with the number-one single "I Don't Care" from their first extended play, 2NE1, which won them the Song of the Year award at the 2009 Mnet Asian Music Awards, making them the first rookie group to win a daesang in the same year of debut. In August 2009, after finishing promotions for their debut single, the members took a break to focus on individual activities. She released her first solo single "You and I" on October 28, where it became a commercial success and won Best Digital Single at the 2010 Mnet Asian Music Awards.

In late 2010, Park featured on GD & TOP's single "Oh Yeah", appearing on both the Korean and Japanese versions of the song as well as the Japanese music video. The single peaked at number two on the Gaon Chart upon release. On April 21, 2011, she released a second solo digital single, "Don't Cry". The single was a success and achieved a perfect all-kill on Instiz, placing number one on seven local music charts. The same year, Park featured on the song "Having an Affair", performed by G-Dragon and comedian Park Myeong-su in a duo project called GG for the Infinite Challenge Music Festival. The former praised her, saying that "In every song that her voice goes, it's a hit. Her voice is very good". The single was another hit and was the second most downloaded song of 2011. In 2013, Park formed a sub-unit group with labelmate Lee Hi, known as Bom & Hi. The duo released a cover of Mariah Carey's "All I Want for Christmas Is You" on December 17. The same year, she also featured on the Japanese version of G-Dragon's single "Black".

=== 2014–2017: Career setback and 2NE1's disbandment ===
In 2014, it was released to the public that Park had been under investigation for drug smuggling (80 Adderall tablets) through international mail in the past. A package, sent by family members residing in the United States to her residing in South Korea, was stopped at Incheon International Airport customs. Park was put under investigation but was never charged. In a statement issued by YG Entertainment's Yang Hyun-suk, he spoke against the allegations of preferential treatment. He explained that the drug was illegal in South Korea but legal in the United States. She was unable to travel to the United States during that time due to her busy schedule. Park contacted her U.S. physician to refill her medication. Yang further explained that Park sought out medical care from South Korean physicians and had undergone therapy for attention deficit hyperactivity disorder but proved to be not as effective as her treatment in the United States. In 2010, at the time of investigation, she had provided the prosecutor her medical records from her U.S. hospital confirming her diagnoses as well as ongoing treatment plan. That same year, Park joined the cast of SBS's Roommate, a reality show which features eleven celebrities living together in a share house. She shortly withdrew from the program following the scandal and went into a hiatus from the entertainment industry.

Park's next appearance was on December 2, 2015, performing with 2NE1 at the 2015 Mnet Asian Music Awards. On November 25, 2016, YG Entertainment announced the disbandment of the group. The company also revealed that former members CL and Dara signed a solo contract, hinting at Park's departure from the company. Park, however, took part in 2NE1's final song "Goodbye", released on January 21, 2017. On April 30, 2017, she announced through social media that she is now under YG Entertainment's subsidiary, The Black Label, and is preparing to release a solo album. On May 1, 2017, the company denied that statement and declared that Park had not signed any new contract with the company or any of their subsidiaries since they broke her contract back in November 2016. She followed up on social media replying to fans that she did sign a contract and she is coming back.

=== 2018–2023: Career resurgence and stand-alone singles ===
On July 20, 2018, Park reportedly signed an exclusive contract with the newly established entertainment company D-Nation Entertainment. It was planned that she would be releasing her debut mini-album consisting of five to six tracks in November, as well as promotional activities overseas. However, it was reported on October 2, 2018, that the mini-album would instead be released around January 2019 and that Park will be opening a YouTube channel. The following day, it was reported that she would be making her first small screen appearance in four years through YG Future Strategy Office, which stars former labelmate Seungri. Park was featured in the series' third episode, "Music Business", which premiered on October 5, 2018, on Netflix.

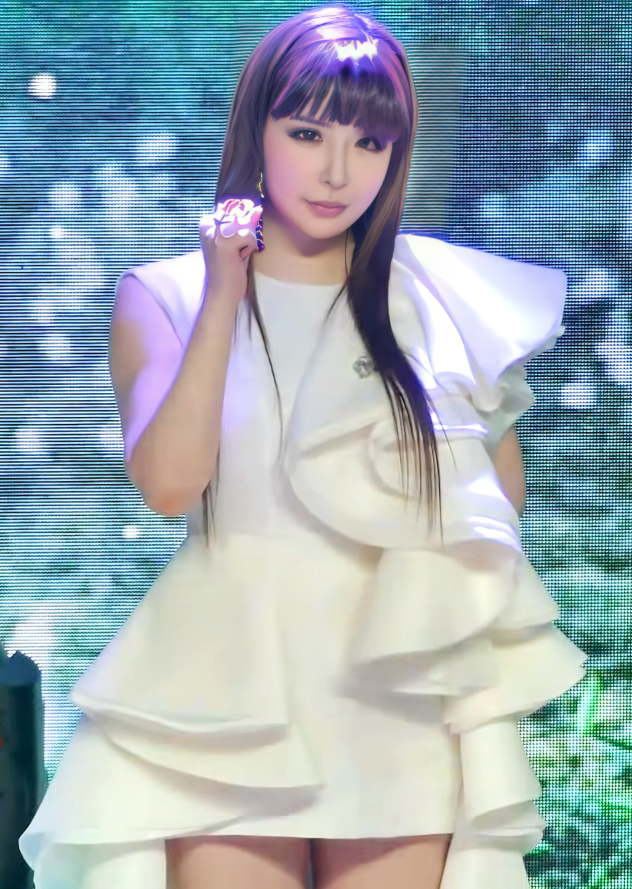
Park at Spring's showcase event in 2019

"Spring" was announced on February 15, 2019, as the lead single off her debut single album of the same name, which was released on March 13, 2019, alongside the premiere of its music video. The song was produced by Brave Brothers and was described as an "R&B song of medium tempo". Additionally, "Spring" features vocals from Park's former groupmate Dara. The song was performed for the first time during Spring's showcase event, which was held on the same day of its release. "Spring" debuted at number two on Billboard's World Digital Song Sales chart as highest-selling K-pop song and highest-charting new entry of that week. Spring was re-released as an extended play titled re:Blue Rose on May 2, 2019. The lead single titled "4:44" was produced by the Brave Brothers once again and featured vocals from Wheein. Park released "I Do, I Do" for Perfume as her first soundtrack appearance on July 1, 2019. She held her first fanmeet, billed as "Spring Again", on July 20, 2019. Park competed in Mnet's reality television competition Queendom, which initially aired on August 29, 2019. She released three singles throughout her run in the competition: covers of "Hann (Alone)" by fellow competitor (G)I-dle and "Eyes, Nose, Lips" by former labelmate Taeyang, and an original song titled "Wanna Go Back" , wherein the former features vocals from Cheetah. She ultimately ended in last place in the competition. Park subsequently featured in "Chanel" by MC Mong, which was released on October 29, 2019. She reunited with Dara for the single titled "First Snow", which was released on December 10, 2019.

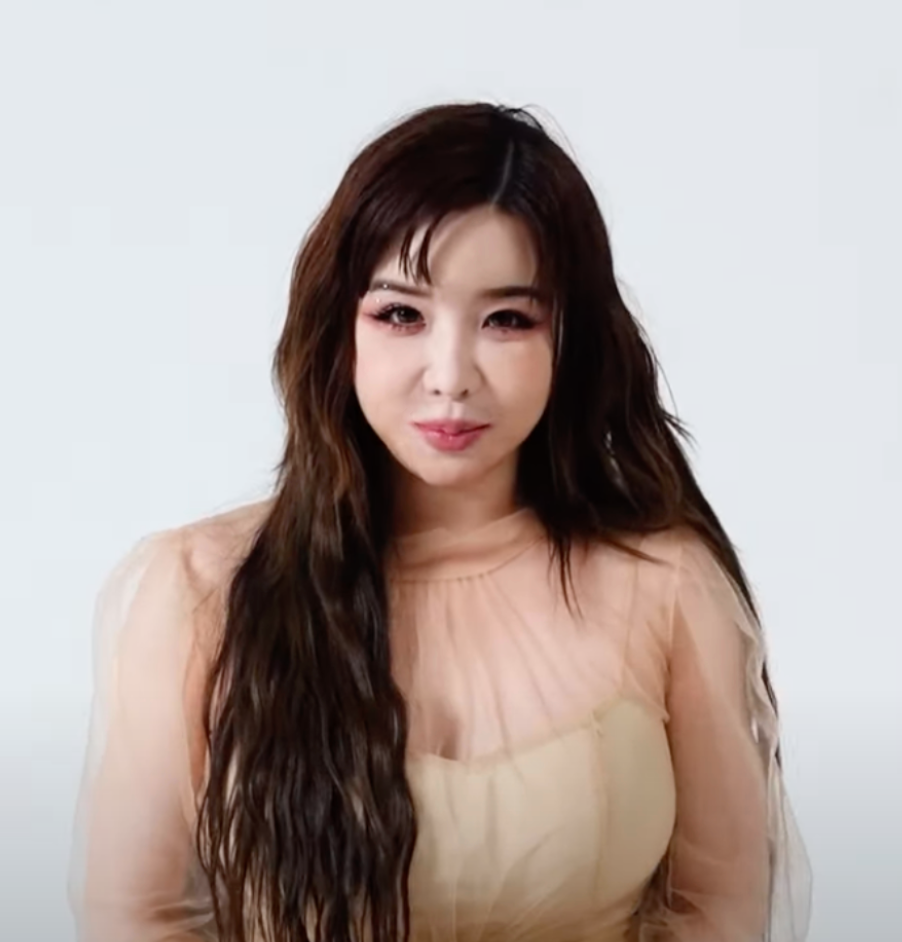
Park in May 2021

On December 21, 2020, Park returned from a year-long hiatus with "Red Light", a collaboration with Sai Sai Kham Leng. She released a standalone single titled "Do Re MI Fa Sol", which features vocals from Changmo, on March 31, 2021. On March 11, 2022, Park released a single titled "Flower", which features Kim Min-seok from MeloMance.

On November 2, 2022, D-Nation Entertainment announced that the release of "Remembered" would be postponed to a new later date due to the aftermath of the Seoul Halloween crowd crush. In June 2023, Park held her first solo concert, "You & I" in Manila, Philippines. In November of that year, Park released the digital single "I" featuring Dawn.

=== 2024–present: Continued solo career and 2NE1 reunion tour ===
In September 2024, Park held her second solo concert in Ho Chi Minh City, Vietnam. In October 2024, Park resumed group activities with 2NE1 under YG Entertainment with their 15th anniversary Welcome Back Tour. She suspended her activities with 2NE1 on August 6, 2025 due to medical advice calling for increased rest.

== Filmography ==
=== Films ===
Year	Title	Role	Notes
2009	Girlfriends	Cameo role	Club party guest

=== Web series ===
Year	Title	Role	Notes
2018	YG Future Strategy Office	Guests	Episode 3

=== Television show ===
Year	Title	Role	Notes
2009	Style	Cameo role	Episode 6
2014	Roommate	Cast Member	Season 1
2019	Immortal Songs: Singing the Legend	Contestant	Episode: "2019 Summer Special, Part 1: So Chan-whee & Kim Hyun-jung"
2019	Queendom	Contestant	Season 1
2019–2020	King of Mask Singer	Finalist (118th generation)	
2022	Sing Forest 2	Cast Member	Season 2

== Discography ==
=== Single albums ===
Title	Details	Peak chart positions	Sales
Title	Details	KOR	Sales
Spring	Released: March 13, 2019; Re-released: May 2, 2019 (re:Blue Rose); Label: D-Nation; Formats: CD, digital download	2	KOR: 22,547

=== Singles ===
Title	Year	Peak chart positions				Sales	Album
Title	Year	KOR	KOR Hot	NZ Hot	US World	Sales	Album
As lead artist
"You and I"	2009	1	—	—	—	KOR: 1,002,336 (Note: Sales for "You and I" in 2010 and first week of May 2011)	To Anyone
"Don't Cry"	2011	1	—	—	—	KOR: 2,513,000; US: 10,000	2NE1
"Spring" (봄) (featuring Sandara Park)	2019	3	4	39	2	US: 1,000	Spring
"4:44" (4시 44분) (featuring Wheein)	2019	84	78	—	—	—N/a	re:Blue Rose
"First Snow" (첫눈) (with Sandara Park)	2019	168	—	—	19	—N/a	Non-album singles
"Do Re Mi Fa Sol" (도레미파솔) (featuring Changmo)	2021	130	—	—	—	—N/a	Non-album singles
"Flower" (꽃) (featuring Kim Min-seok)	2022	53	71	—	—	—N/a	Non-album singles
"Remembered"	2022	145	—	—	—	—N/a	Non-album singles
"I" (아이) (featuring Dawn)	2023	— (Note: "I" did not enter the Circle Digital Chart, but debuted and peaked at number 17 on the Circle Download Chart.)	—	—	—	—N/a	Non-album singles
As featured artist
"We Belong Together" (Big Bang featuring Park Bom)	2006	—	—	—	—	—N/a	Big Bang
"Forever with U" (BigBang featuring Park Bom)	2006	—	—	—	—	—N/a	Big Bang 03
"Along My Way" (Red Roc featuring Park Bom)	2007	—	—	—	—	—N/a	Non-album single
"Baby Boy" (Lexy featuring Park Bom)	2007	—	—	—	—	—N/a	Rush
"Oh Yeah" (GD & TOP featuring Park Bom)	2010	—	2	—	—	KOR: 1,381,000	GD & TOP
"Having an Affair" (G-Dragon & Park Myung-soo featuring Park Bom)	2011	1	14	—	—	KOR: 3,626,000	Infinite Challenge
"Up" (Epik High featuring Park Bom)	2012	6	8	—	—	KOR: 1,002,106	99
"Black" (Japanese ver.) (G-Dragon featuring Park Bom)	2013	—	—	—	—	—N/a	Coup d'Etat + One of a Kind & Heartbreaker
"Chanel" (MC Mong featuring Park Bom)	2019	6	5	—	—	—N/a	Channel 8
"Red Light" (Sai Sai Kham Leng featuring Park Bom)	2020	—	—	—	—	—N/a	Non-album single
"—" denotes releases that did not chart or were not released in that region.

=== Promotional singles ===
Title	Year	Peak chart positions		Album
Title	Year	KOR	US World	Album
"Now N New 2021" (우리 하나되어 2021) (with various)	2021	— (Note: "Now N New 2021" did not enter the Circle Digital Chart, but peaked at number 86 on the Circle Download Chart.)	—	2021 Now we become one again
"Holding the End of This Night" (이 밤의 끝을 잡고)	2023	—	—	18 Project 8th Album
"—" denotes releases that did not chart or were not released in that region.

=== Soundtrack appearances ===
Title	Year	Peak chart positions		Album
Title	Year	KOR	US World	Album
"I Do, I Do"	2019	— (Note: "I Do, I Do" did not enter the Gaon Digital Chart, but debuted and peaked at number 27 on the Gaon BGM Chart.)	—	Perfume OST, Part 8
"Break Up with Her" (그녀와의 이별)	2019	—	—	Immortal Songs: Singing the Legend (2019 Summer Special, Part 1: So Chan-whee & Kim Hyun-jung)
"Hann (Alone)" (featuring Cheetah)	2019	—	13	Queendom <Cover Contest>, Part 1
"Eyes, Nose, Lips"	2019	—	—	Queendom <Box of Fan-dora>, Part 2
"Wanna Go Back" (되돌릴 수 없는 돌아갈 수 없는 돌아갈 곳 없는)	2019	—	18	Queendom <Final Comeback>
"My Reflection" (넌 나의 거울)	2022	— (Note: "My Reflection" did not enter the Gaon Digital Chart, but debuted and peaked at number 27 on the Gaon Download Chart.)	—	My Reflection (Webtoon 'Fight for My Way' X Park Bom)
"PADO" (파도)	2022	—	—	Sing Forest 2 (Summer)
"To you I, to me you" (너에게 난 나에게 넌)	2022	—	—	Sing Forest 2 (Excitement)
"Desire and Hope" (원하고 원망하죠)	2022	—	—	Sing Forest 2 (Love)
"One of These Days" (언젠가는)	2022	— (Note: "one of these days" did not enter the Circle Digital Chart, but debuted and peaked at number 188 on the Circle Download Chart.)	—	Sing Forest 2 (Farewell)
"I Want U Back"	2024	—	—	Face Me OST Part 1
"—" denotes releases that did not chart or were not released in that region.

=== Other charted songs ===
Title	Year	Peak chart positions		Sales	Album
Title	Year	KOR	US World	Sales	Album
"My Lover"	2019	125	5	US: 1,000	Spring
"Shameful"	2019	149	4	US: 1,000	Spring

== Awards and nominations ==
Name of the award ceremony, year presented, award category, nominated work, and the result of the nomination
Award ceremony	Year	Category	Nominated work	Result	Ref.
Cyworld Digital Music Awards	2009	Song of the Month (November)	"You and I"	Won	
Cyworld Digital Music Awards	2011	Song of the Month (July)	"Having an Affair" (w/ Park Myung-soo, G-Dragon)	Won	
Gaon Chart Music Awards	2020	Song of the Year (March)	"Spring"	Nominated	
Golden Disc Awards	2012	Digital Song Bonsang	"Don't Cry"	Nominated	
Golden Disc Awards	2012	Popularity Award	"Don't Cry"	Nominated	
Golden Disc Awards	2013	Best Hip-Hop Award	"Up" (w/ Epik High)	Won	
Melon Music Awards	2011	Best Hip-Hop Award	"Oh Yeah" (w/ GD & TOP)	Won	
Melon Music Awards	2011	Hot Trend Award	"Having an Affair" (w/ Park Myung-soo, G-Dragon)	Won	
Melon Music Awards	2011	Song of the Year	"Having an Affair" (w/ Park Myung-soo, G-Dragon)	Nominated	
Melon Music Awards	2019	Best R&B/Soul	"Spring"	Nominated	
Mnet Asian Music Awards	2010	Best Digital Single	"You and I"	Won	
Mnet Asian Music Awards	2019	Best Vocal Performance (Solo)	"Spring"	Nominated	
Mnet Asian Music Awards	2019	Worldwide Fans' Choice	Park Bom	Nominated	
Philippine K-pop Awards	2009	Hottest Female K-pop Star	Park Bom	Won	
Seoul Music Awards	2020	Bonsang Award	Park Bom	Nominated	
Seoul Music Awards	2020	Hallyu Special Award	Park Bom	Nominated	
Seoul Music Awards	2020	Popularity Award	Park Bom	Nominated	
Seoul Music Awards	2020	QQ Music Most Popular K-Pop Artist Award	Park Bom	Nominated	
Seoul Music Awards	2020	R&B/Hip Hop Award	"Spring"	Nominated	
Soribada Best K-Music Awards	2019	R&B Artist Award	Park Bom	Won	
