= High High =

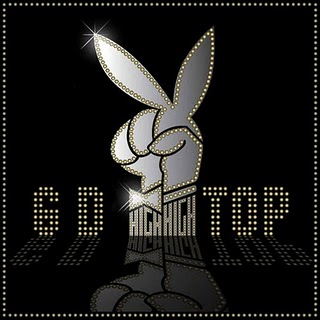

Single by GD & TOP

from the album GD & TOP
- Released: December 15, 2010
- Genre: Electropop; hip hop
- Length: 3:08
- Label: YG Entertainment
- Songwriters: G-Dragon; T.O.P; Teddy
- Producer: Teddy

GD & TOP singles chronology
"High High" (2010)	"Oh Yeah" (2010)

Music video
- "High High" on YouTube

"High High" is a song recorded by South Korean duo GD & TOP (G-Dragon and T.O.P). It was released on December 15, 2010, by YG Entertainment, as the first single from their self-titled debut album GD & TOP (2010). It was written by the duo with Teddy, and produced by the latter.

== Composition ==
"High High" is a pop-rap and electropop song with references to old-school hip hop. E. Alex Jung from Vulture described the song as a "synth club banger". The track samples the 1985 song "La Di Da Di" by Doug E. Fresh and Slick Rick. The lyrics include sexual metaphors.

== Reception ==
"High High" received acclaim from music critics. Spin named the single the seventh greatest K-pop song of all time, commenting that the track "grows gruffer and faster as it buttaflies [sic] higher and higher" and concluding "this is how LMFAO and Far East Movement want to sound." Billboard chose "High High" as one of T.O.P's most memorable songs, with Tamar Herman writing that the "G-H-E-T-T-O E-L-E-C-T-R-O" chant on the track's bridge "remains one of the most catchy and baffling moments of Bigbang's career." Additionally, the single's music video was named by Stereogum the fourth best K-pop music video of all time, with Tom Breihan writing that the track "does poppy American club-rap better than any American has done it in many years" and that GD & TOP "appear to be having more fun than anyone else on the global pop-music landscape" in the music video. Korean magazine Ize complimented that the song's uses the "club culture" boldly, and the result is "refined and digested".

== Charts and sales ==
=== Weekly charts ===
Chart (2010–11)	Peak position
South Korea (Gaon Weekly Digital Chart)	3
South Korea (Gaon Weekly Download Chart)	3
South Korea (Gaon Weekly Streaming Chart)	3
US World Digital Songs (Billboard)	17

=== Year-end charts ===
Year-End Chart (2010–11)	Peak position
South Korea (Gaon Yearly Digital Chart) - 2010	144
South Korea (Gaon Yearly Digital Chart) - 2011	83

=== Sales ===
Chart	Sales
South Korea (Gaon Download Chart)	1,390,163

== Music programs awards ==
Program	Date
M! Countdown (Mnet)	January 6, 2011
Inkigayo (SBS)	January 9, 2011
