= GD & TOP (album) =

GD&TOP
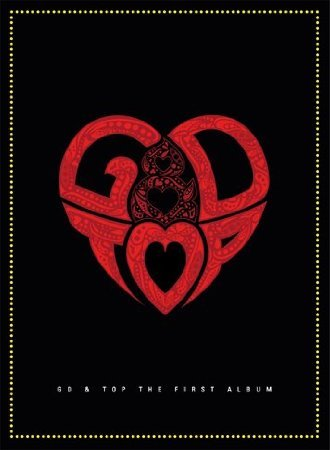
- Album cover of the 2011 reissue

Studio album by GD & TOP
- Released: December 24, 2010
- Recorded: 2010
- Genre: Pop; hip hop; electro-hop; pop rap
- Length: 38:46
- Language: Korean
- Label: YG; Mnet Media
- Producer: Yang Hyun-suk (exec.); G-Dragon; T.O.P; Teddy; Kush

G-Dragon chronology
Shine a Light (2010)	GD&TOP (2010)	One of a Kind (2012)

T.O.P chronology
GD&TOP (2010)	Doom Dada (Special Edition) (2013)

Singles from GD&TOP
- 1. "High High" Released: 15 December 2010; 2. "Oh Yeah" Released: 15 December 2010; 3. "Knock Out" Released: 3 January 2011

Original album cover
- Cover featuring the "Playboy" bunny logo

GD&TOP is the debut album of South Korean hip-hop duo GD & TOP (G-Dragon and T.O.P), members of Big Bang. Released on December 24, 2010, the album marks the first official collaboration between the two artists. The duo promoted the album extensively, including a worldwide premiere showcase and numerous performances. Three singles were released for promotion: "High High", "Oh Yeah", and "Knock Out". While "High High" went on to become a chart-topper, the latter two singles peaked at number 2 and 3 respectively.

The album is listed by Gaon Album Chart as the fifth best-selling album of 2010 in South Korea, with 130,000 copies sold.

== Background ==
While working on materials with their bandmates for their upcoming album, G-Dragon and T.O.P began to experiment with different styles. According to G-Dragon, the members were trying new "combination[s]" with their music, in which the vocalists — Taeyang, Daesung, and Seungri — were to record their own music as a trio while G-Dragon and T.O.P were to branch off as a duo since they "hadn't been with [their] fans for the past two years." Although the division of the group was initially for BigBang's materials only, G-Dragon and T.O.P saw a positive response to their materials from the fans and went to Yang Hyun-suk, the executive of YG Entertainment, to allow the duo to release an album. After receiving Yang's approval, news of their collaboration was announced in November 2010.

G-Dragon and T.O.P co-wrote the majority of the lyrics to the album, noting that as "rappers [...] we'd like to tell more stories for our fans to listen." In an attempt to create their own style separate from their band, the duo opted for a more hip-hop sound to contrast the group's current genre of electronic music, though G-Dragon acknowledged the influence of R&B, acoustic, and electronic music on the album. The two admitted to becoming "much more diverse [in their] attempts" to create their own style, as well as "how the music develops and the images that the melody and rap portray[s]." They later went on to say that "the reason we mixed such a variety of genres is because we wanted to bring out more of our character that we don't get to show when we're Big Bang." When recordings were done, 11 tracks were recorded, including a collaboration with labelmate Park Bom. The duo later mentioned that after recording the album, they became "attached" to all of their songs as they "worked on each and every one of the songs in...[the]...album by staying up many nights." T.O.P's solo song "Turn It Up" was also included on the album as a bonus track.

Preceding the release of the album, the duo held a worldwide premiere showcase for their album at Times Square in Yeongdeungpo, Seoul, which was broadcast live on YouTube. While hosting it, the duo sampled parts of their tracks to their fans and explained its lyrical contents and background. The duo also showcased a change in their physical appearances. Their constant use of the "peace sign" for their promotional activities (such as the cover design for their album) also gained attention, with the duo explaining that since the mark is similar to the Playboy logo, their attractive, sexy, and fun sides have come out while promoting the album. The peace sign was later retracted after YG Entertainment was asked by Playboy to remove the image for its similarities to its own logo. It was replaced by a typographic image of a heart composed of GD&TOP. This also led to the action of removing all of the music videos on the official Bigbang YouTube channel except for "Baby Goodnight".

In support of their album, the duo released three singles: "High High", "Oh Yeah", and "Knock Out". All three singles preceded the release of the album and were commercial successes: "High High" was a chartopper while "Oh Yeah" and "Knock Out" peaked at number 2 and 3 respectively. They also performed at a Christmas party hosted at a club in Gangnam, Seoul for SK Telecom's "Christmas T Social Party" in addition to the SBS music show Inkigayo. Pictures of the two on the set of their music videos were also released online ahead of the album release. The album was released on Christmas Eve, and debuted at number one with pre-orders of 200,000 copies.

== Track listing ==
GD&TOP – Standard edition
No.	Title	Lyrics	Music	Arrangement	Length
1.	"Intro"	G-Dragon; T.O.P	G-Dragon; T.O.P; Kush	Kush	2:08
2.	"High High"	G-Dragon; T.O.P; Teddy	Teddy	Teddy	3:08
3.	"Oh Yeah (feat. Park Bom)"	G-Dragon; T.O.P; Teddy	Teddy; Sunwoo Jungah	Teddy; Sunwoo Jungah	3:17
4.	"Don't Go Home" (집에 가지마; Jibe Gajima)	G-Dragon	G-Dragon; Teddy; Kush	Teddy; Kush	3:18
5.	"Baby Good Night"	G-Dragon; T.O.P	G-Dragon; T.O.P; Kush; 1 ON	Kush	3:32
6.	"Knock Out" (뻑이가요; Ppeogigayo)	G-Dragon; T.O.P	Diplo; G-Dragon; T.O.P	Diplo	3:27
7.	"Oh Mom" (T.O.P solo)	T.O.P	T.O.P; Kush; 1 ON	Kush	4:32
8.	"Obsession" (악몽; Akmong; G-Dragon solo)	G-Dragon	G-Dragon; Kush	Kush	5:17
9.	"Of All Days" (오늘따라; Oneul Ttara; T.O.P solo)	T.O.P	T.O.P; Choice37	Choice 37	3:25
10.	"What Do You Want?" (어쩌란 말이냐?; Eojjeoran Marinya?; G-Dragon solo)	G-Dragon	G-Dragon; Kush	Sunwoo Jungah; 1 ON	3:25
11.	"Turn It Up" (T.O.P solo; bonus track)	T.O.P	T.O.P; Teddy	Teddy	3:32
Total length:					38:46

Japanese CD+DVD Edition – DVD bonus tracks
No.	Title	Length
1.	"High High" (Music video)
2.	"Knock Out" (Music video)
3.	"Turn It Up (T.O.P)" (Music video)

Taiwanese CD+DVD Edition – DVD bonus tracks
No.	Title	Length
1.	"Knock Out" (Music video)
2.	"Baby Good Night" (Music video)
3.	"High High" (Music video)
4.	"Turn It Up (T.O.P)" (Music video)

Sampling credits

- "Intro" contains elements from "It's Yours to Have" as written by Reginald Dozier and McKinley Jackson, and performed by Freda Payne.
- "Don't Go Home" contains elements from "Make It with You" as written by David Gates and performed by Whispers.
- "What Do You Want?" contains elements from "Shazam!" as written by Duane Eddy and Lee Hazlewood, and performed by Duane Eddy.
- "Knock Out" contains uncredited elements from "Percolator" as written and performed by Cajmere.

== Charts and sales ==
=== Charts ===
Chart (2011)	Peak position
Japan Top Albums Sales (Billboard)	8
Japan Albums Chart (Oricon)	8
South Korea Albums Chart (Gaon)	1

=== Monthly chart ===
Chart (2010)	Position
South Korea Albums Chart (Gaon)	1

=== Year-end chart ===
Chart (2010)	Position
South Korea Albums Chart (Gaon)	5

=== Sales ===
Chart	Amount
Gaon physical sales	202,229

== Accolades ==
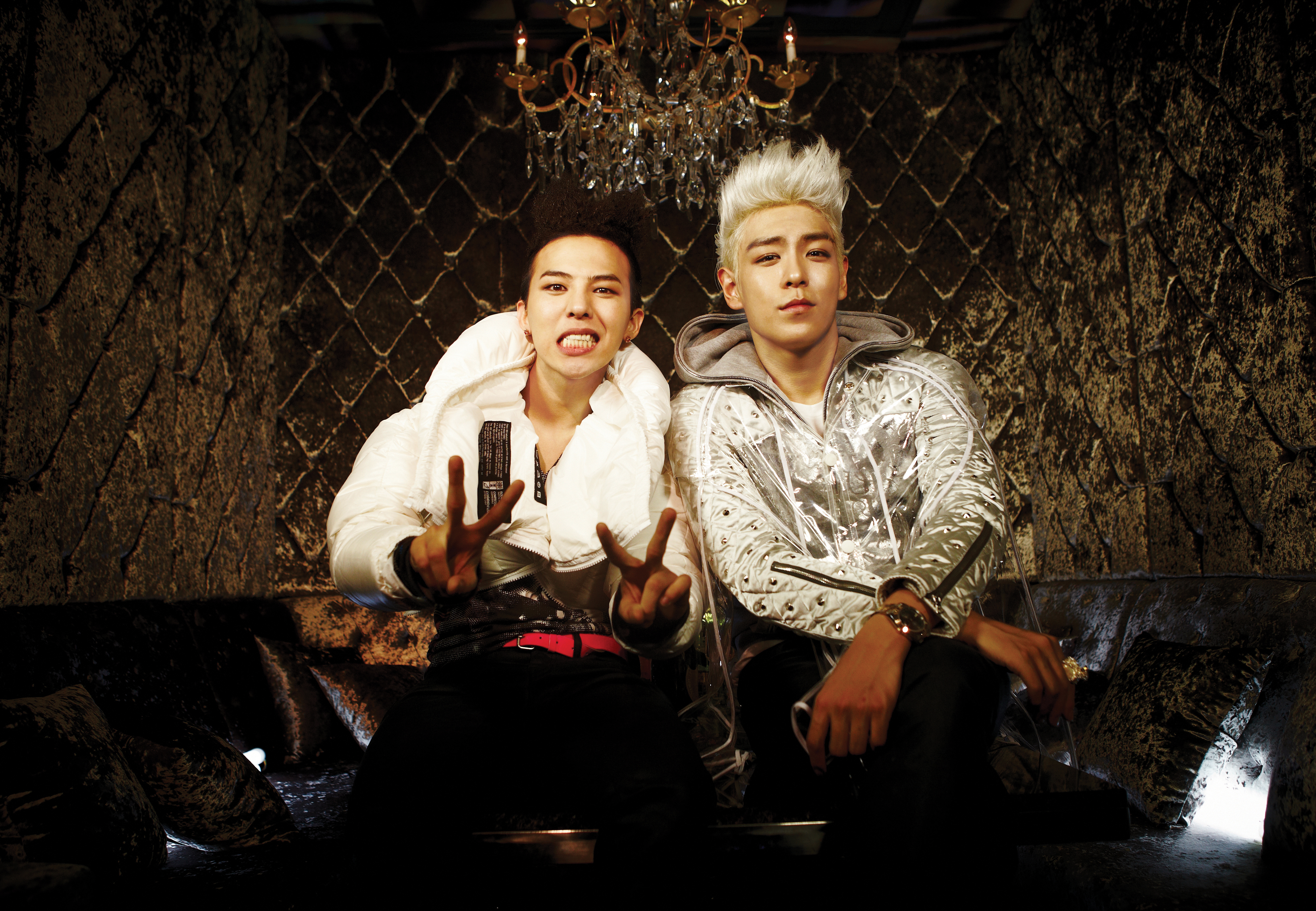
G-Dragon and TOP during music video shoot of "High High"

=== Awards ===
Year	Award	Category	Result
2011	Melon Music Awards	Rap/Hip Hop	Won

=== Music program awards ===
Song	Program	Date
"Oh Yeah" (featuring Park Bom)	M! Countdown (Mnet)	December 30, 2010
"High High"	M! Countdown (Mnet)	January 6, 2011
"High High"	Inkigayo (SBS)	January 9, 2011

== Release history ==
Region	Date	Format	Distributing Label	Ref
South Korea	December 24, 2010	CD; digital download	YG Entertainment; Mnet Media	
South Korea	July 12, 2011 (Reissue)	CD	YG Entertainment; KMP Holdings	
Japan	February 23, 2011	CD; CD+DVD	Universal Music Japan	
Philippines	March 5, 2011	CD	Universal Records	
Taiwan	September 28, 2012	CD+DVD (limited edition)	Warner Music Taiwan	
