= GD & TOP =

South Korean boy band

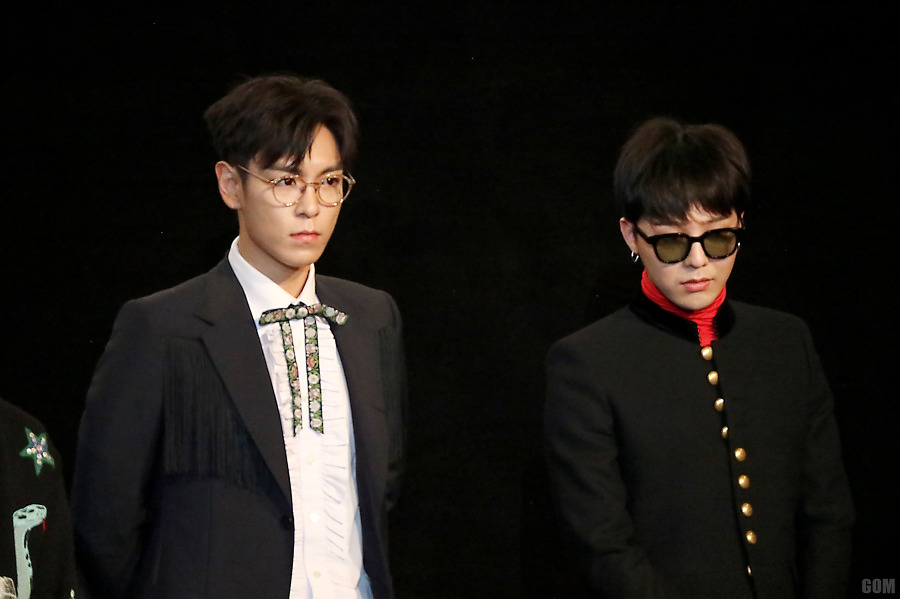
- GD & TOP in 2016

Background information
- Origin: Seoul, South Korea
- Genres: K-pop, hip hop
- Years active: 2010; 2015
- Label: YG
- Spinoff of: BigBang

GD & TOP were a South Korean hip-hop/pop duo formed by G-Dragon and T.O.P, the rappers of the K-pop boy band BigBang in 2010. The release of their first album, GD & TOP (2010) was a commercial success becoming one of the best selling albums of the year in South Korea, and spawning the top-five hits "High High", "Oh Yeah", and "Knock Out" on the Gaon Digital Chart. After a five-year hiatus, they released the single "Zutter", which peaked at number two on the Gaon Digital Chart.

== History ==
=== 2010–2011: Formation and first album ===
YG Entertainment announced the a sub-unit between G-Dragon and T.O.P under the name "GD & TOP" in November 2010, and to release an album with the same name. The duo held a worldwide premiere showcase for their album at Times Square in Yeongdeungpo of Seoul, which was also broadcast live on YouTube. The album was released on Christmas Eve, and debuted at number one on the Gaon Chart with pre-orders of 200,000 copies. By the end of 2010 the album had surpassed 130,000 copies sold in a week, becoming the fifth best-selling album of the year. As of 2015 the album sold 200,000 copies.

To promote their album, G.Dragon and T.O.P released three music videos for the tracks "High High", "Knock Out", and "Baby Goodnight". "High High" was released first, then "Baby Goodnight." However, due to the song being banned twice for being too explicit, the release of the music video for their song "Don't Go Home" was postponed till late June 2011. The singles attained commercial successes, topping the online music charts in South Korea. In the Gaon Digital Chart, "Oh Yeah!" peaked at number two, "High High" at number three, while "Knock Out" and "Don't Go Home" peaked at number five and eleven, respectively.

=== 2015: "Zutter" ===
After a four-year hiatus, YG Entertainment announced that the duo will come back with a new single as a part of BigBang's Made Series E. The teasers were released on July 25, 2015, with the song name "Zutter". The song was a commercially success, selling 280,817 downloads in its first week on Gaon Chart peaked at number two in the Digital and Download charts. The single charted second on US Billboard World Digital Songs and in the Chinese QQ Music video chart. In the end of 2015, the song sold 982,710 copies in South Korea and 6,000 in USA.

== Impact ==
In 2012, "Knock Out" and "High High" were both listed as one of the best K-Pop music videos of all time by Stereogum, ranking at seventh and fourth, respectively. That same year, "High High" was also named the seventh greatest K-Pop song of all time by Spin.

XXL listed the duo as one of "15 Korean Rappers You Should Know", stating that "if it wasn't for acts like these two, Korean rap probably wouldn't have amassed such international appeal that it’s garnering now." The magazine also wrote that "K-Pop's currently full of boy bands with designated rapper as a member, and nine out of ten times they're modeled after" GD & TOP. Korean magazine Ize wrote that GD & TOP inspired several idol groups to make "more extreme or extraordinary attempts" concept and music wise that their groups could not do through unit activities.

== Discography ==
=== Albums ===
Title	Album details	Peak chart positions				Sales
Title	Album details	KOR	JPN	TW	US World	Sales
GD & TOP	Released: December 24, 2010; Label: YG Entertainment; Format: CD, digital download	1	8	10	11	KOR: 204,249

=== Singles ===
==== As lead artist ====
Title	Year	Peak chart positions	Sales	Album
Title	Year	KOR	Sales	Album
"High High"	2010	3	KOR: 1,390,163	GD & TOP
"Oh Yeah" (featuring Park Bom)	2010	2	KOR: 1,380,732	GD & TOP
"Knock Out"	2010	5	KOR: 775,180	GD & TOP
"Zutter"	2015	2	KOR: 1,015,028; US: 6,000	E and Made

==== Other charted songs ====
Title	Year	Peak chart positions	Sales	Album
Title	Year	KOR	Sales	Album
"Don't Go Home"	2010	11	KOR: 859,056	GD & TOP
"Baby Goodnight"	2010	24	—N/a	GD & TOP
"Intro"	2010	71	—N/a	GD & TOP

==== As featured artist ====
Title	Year	Peak chart positions	Sales	Album
Title	Year	KOR Int.	Sales	Album
"Dancing on My Own" (Pixie Lott ft. GD & TOP)	2012	2	KOR: 342,113	Young Foolish Happy
"Bubble Butt" (Remix) (Major Lazer feat. Bruno Mars, G-Dragon, T.O.P, Tyga and Mystic)	2013	2	KOR: 95,848	Free the Universe

=== Music videos ===
Year	Music video	Album
2010	"Knock Out"	GD & TOP
2010	"High High"	GD & TOP
2010	"Baby Good Night"	GD & TOP
2010	"Don't Go Home"	GD & TOP
2010	"Oh Yeah"	GD & TOP
2015	"Zutter"	Made

== Awards and nominations ==
List of awards and nominations
Award ceremony	Year	Category	Nominee / Work	Result	Ref.
Melon Music Awards	2011	Best Rap/Hip Hop Award	"Oh Yeah" (feat. Park Bom)	Won	
