= Doom Dada =

- Cover of the physical edition.

Single by T.O.P
- Released: November 15, 2013
- Recorded: 2013
- Genre: Alternative hip hop
- Length: 3:33
- Label: YG
- Songwriter: T.O.P
- Producers: T.O.P; Choice37

T.O.P singles chronology
"Turn It Up" (2010)	"Doom Dada" (2013)	"Zutter" (2015)

Music video
- "Doom Dada" on YouTube

"Doom Dada" (Korean: 둠 다다) is a song recorded by the South Korean rapper T.O.P, released as a single via YG Entertainment on November 15, 2013. It was written by T.O.P, who also composed the track with Choice37.

== Release ==
"Doom Dada" was released digitally on November 15, 2013. The announcement was made through YG Entertainment's official website, with a teaser picture showing the rapper riding a motorcycle with a slightly creepy giant baby in the motorcycle side car. On December 13, a physical single album was released, including a CD with "Doom Dada" and its instrumental, unreleased music video making videos and a photobook made up of making of scenes.

== Music video ==
Mirroring the video of his previous single, "Turn It Up", "Doom Dada" is also shot in black and white. The music video for "Doom Dada" was directed by Seo Hyun-seung. The music video references the Stanley Kubrick's movie 2001: A Space Odyssey. In a scene, there are apes who find a bone and start experimenting with it. In the movie, it shows the evolution of the human race, but in T.O.P's case as it's a microphone, it's showing the evolution of him as a rapper. Another inspiration for the video was the surrealist artist Salvador Dalí. T.O.P wears an upside down mustache, designed in the same way as Dalí's. Additionally, two of the artist's painting are parodied in the video: Baby Map of the World and The Three Sphinxes of Bikini. T.O.P stated that he "wanted to make a unique video that looks like a cult film with some fun elements, a video with a message. I wanted a lot of people to easily visualize the story behind the video."

== Critical reception ==
"Doom Dada" earned the #1 position on Dazed magazine's Top 10 K-Pop tracks of 2013, with the magazine describing the track as "unexpected and, from a pop standpoint, virtually impenetrable on the first go", adding that the "lyrical rhythms are both inviting and alienating, while the beats align to trap and M.I.A's jagged tribalism. But go deeper and recognisable cadences reveal themselves.... it's K-Pop but sly, frenetic and slippery." Dazed concluded that, with this song, T.O.P was leading the evolution of K-Pop. Billboard praised the song, noting how the "melody is magnetizing with its whirring synths, tribal beats, and chanting, all of which pale in comparison to the rapper's aggressive, multi-tonal delivery of his verses," and felt that T.O.P "revealed his true artistry" with this song.

== Track listing ==
Digital single
No.	Title	Lyrics	Music	Arrangement	Length
1.	"Doom Dada"	T.O.P	T.O.P; Choice37	Choice37	3:33
Total length:					3:33

CD single
No.	Title	Lyrics	Music	Arrangement	Length
1.	"Doom Dada"	T.O.P	T.O.P; Choice37	Choice37	3:33
2.	"Doom Dada (Instrumental)"		T.O.P; Choice37		3:33
Total length:					7:06

== Charts and sales ==
Chart (2013)	Peak position
South Korea (Gaon Weekly Digital Chart)	4
South Korea (Gaon Monthly Digital Chart)	21
South Korea (Gaon Weekly Download Chart)	5
South Korea (Gaon Weekly Streaming Chart)	8
South Korea (Gaon Weekly Album Chart)	13
United States (Billboard World Digital Songs)	3

=== Sales ===
Chart	Sales
Gaon Download Chart	602,050
Gaon Album Chart	20,885

== Release history ==
Region	Date	Format	Label
South Korea	November 15, 2013	Digital download	YG Entertainment, KT Music
Worldwide	November 15, 2013	Digital download	YG Entertainment, KT Music
South Korea	December 13, 2013	CD single	YG Entertainment, KT Music
Worldwide	December 13, 2013	CD single	YG Entertainment, KT Music
Japan	December 18, 2013	Digital download	YG Entertainment, YGEX
