= T.O.P =

South Korean rapper (born 1987)

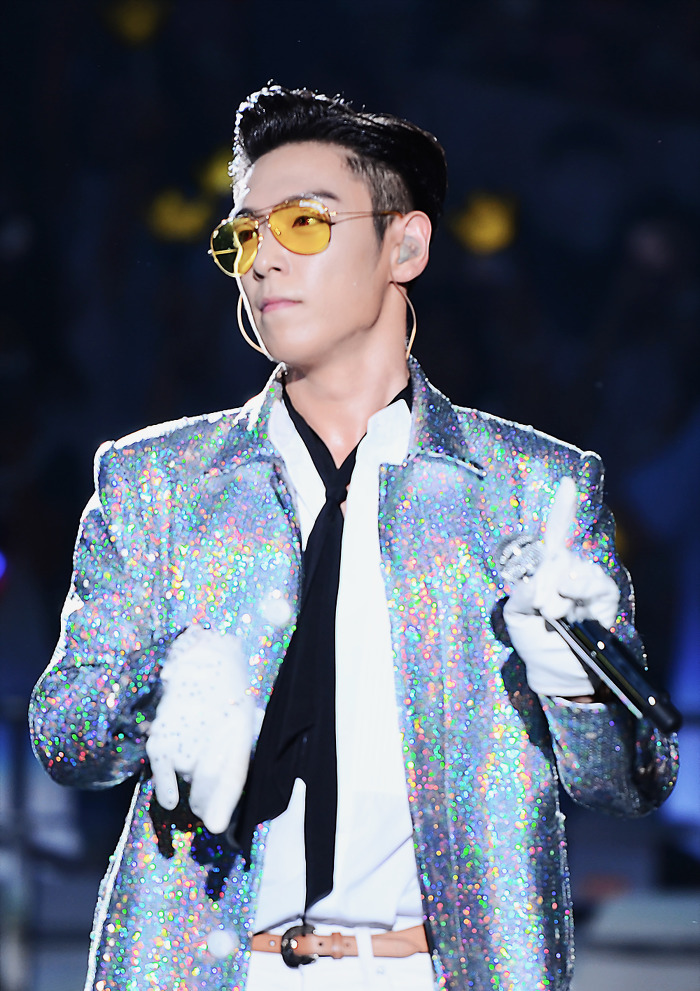
- T.O.P in August 2016
- Born: Choi Seung-hyun; November 4, 1987 (age 39); Seoul, South Korea
- Occupations: Rapper; lyricist; composer; record producer; actor; philanthropist
- Years active: 2006–present
- Musical career
- Genres: K-pop; hip hop
- Instrument: Vocals
- Labels: Top Spot; YG; YGEX
- Formerly of: BigBang; GD & TOP

Korean name
- Hangul: 최승현
- RR: Choe Seunghyeon
- MR: Ch'oe Sŭnghyŏn

Choi Seung-hyun (Korean: 최승현; born November 4, 1987), known professionally as T.O.P, is a South Korean rapper, musician, philanthropist, and actor. He performed as an underground rapper before joining the record label YG Entertainment and debuted as the lead rapper of the boy band BigBang in 2006. The group became one of the best-selling groups of all time in Asia and one of the best-selling boy bands in the world. In 2010, while the group was on hiatus, T.O.P and G-Dragon collaborated to release the album, GD & TOP. As a solo rapper, he has released two digital singles, "Turn It Up" (2010) and "Doom Dada" (2013), that have peaked at number two and four, respectively, on the Gaon Digital Chart.

T.O.P made his acting debut in 2007 through the TV series I Am Sam (2007), followed by Iris (2009) and the TV movie Nineteen (2009). He made his film debut with 71: Into the Fire (2010), for which he received praise and won multiple accolades including Best New Actor at the 2010 Blue Dragon Film Awards and the 2011 Baeksang Arts Awards. Subsequently, he garnered lead roles in the films Commitment (2013), for which he was awarded 'New Asian Actor of the Year' at the Busan International Film Festival and Tazza: The Hidden Card (2014). In 2024, T.O.P portrayed Thanos in the second season of the Netflix dystopian survival thriller series Squid Game.

== Life and career ==
=== 1987–2006: Career beginnings and debut with BigBang ===
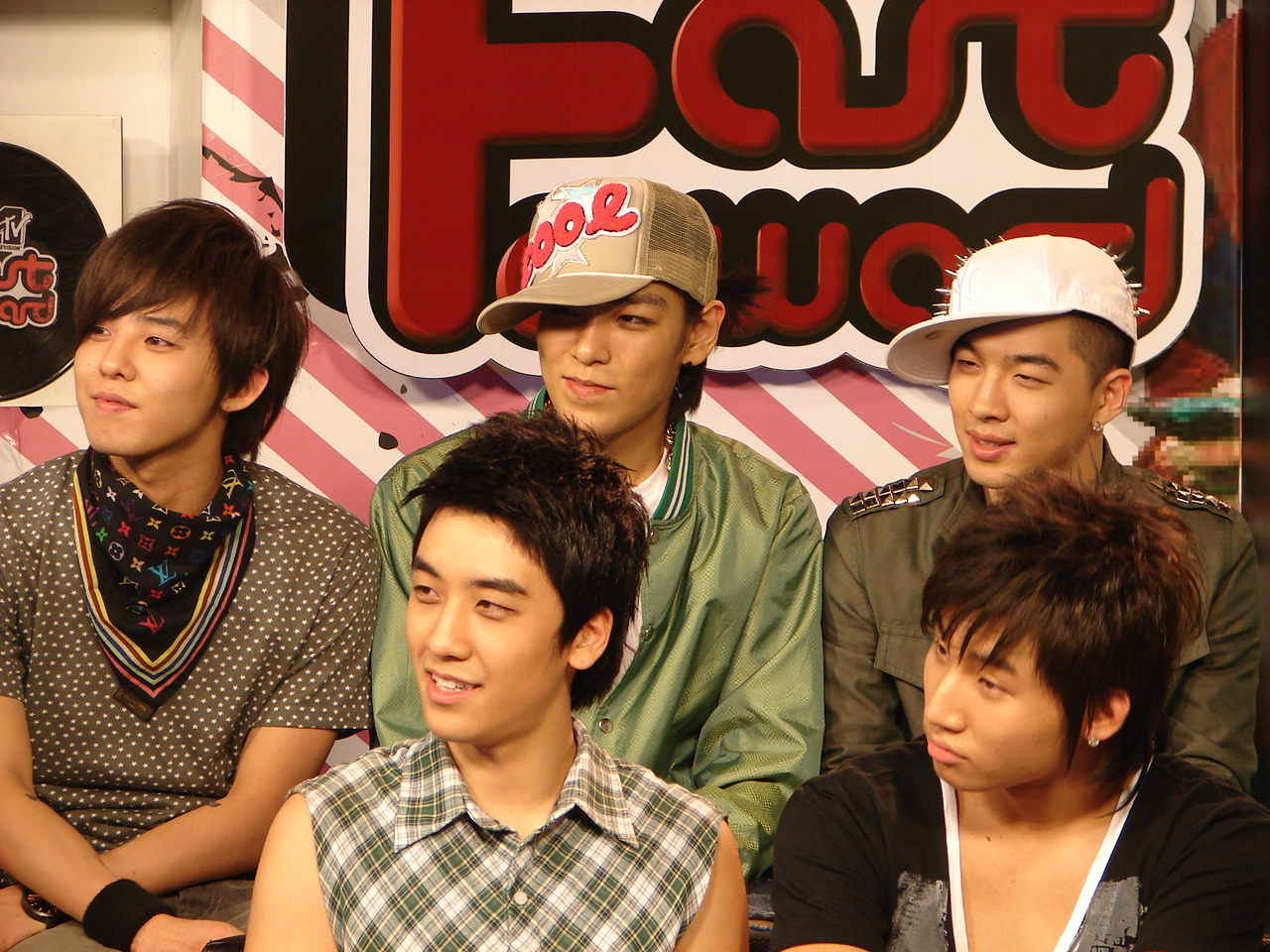
BigBang at MTV Fast Forward, Thailand, December 2007

Choi Seung-hyun was born in the Songpa District of Seoul, South Korea. He is the great nephew of Korea's pioneering abstract art artist Kim Whanki and grew up in contact with art due to his family. Choi became interested in hip hop at a young age. He and fellow future BigBang member Kwon Ji-yong were "neighborhood friend[s] from middle school" and often danced and rapped together. Although Kwon later moved away and the two "became distant", Choi was contacted by Kwon when YG Entertainment, Kwon's record label, was scouting for possible candidates to create a boy group. By then, Choi had already performed on many underground stages at hip hop clubs and established a reputation as an underground rapper with the stage name Tempo. In 2003 under the name of Tempo, he was the winner of KBS Radio's Rap Battle. After contact, Choi subsequently recorded several demos with Kwon and sent them to Yang Hyun-suk, CEO of YG Entertainment, who later asked him to audition. Choi was initially rejected by the record label, which deemed him too "chubby" to fit the "idealistic version" of an idol. He later "went home and exercised hard because [he] wanted to join YG Entertainment," losing 20 kg in 40 days. Six months later, Choi returned for another audition and was signed.

Given the stage name of T.O.P. (탑) by senior YG artist Seven, he became one of two rappers alongside G-Dragon (Kwon's stage name) in BigBang. The two were paired with four others: Taeyang, Daesung, Seungri and Hyunseung and a documentary leading up to their debut was aired to promote them. Hyunseung was later dropped by Yang, and BigBang made its official debut with five members. Their first studio album, Big Bang Vol. 1 - Since 2007, received lukewarm receptions, and included T.O.P.'s first solo song "Big Boy". The group achieved mainstream success with the release of the song "Lies" (거짓말; Geojitmal) from the extended play Always (2007), which topped several charts upon its release. The singles, "Last Farewell" (마지막 인사; Majimak Insa) from Hot Issue (2008) and "Day by Day" (하루하루; Haru Haru) from Stand Up (2008), became chart-toppers as well.

=== 2007–2010: Solo career development, move into acting, and GD & TOP ===
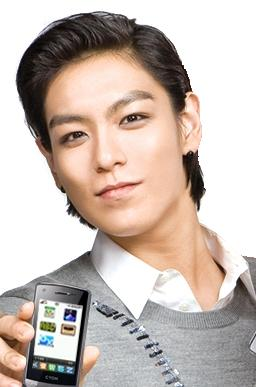
T.O.P posing for an LG Phone commercial in 2009

After releasing the band's albums and singles, T.O.P. began working on his solo career. In April 2007, he was featured with fellow BigBang members Taeyang and G-Dragon on singer Lexy's single "Super Fly" for her album Rush. Later that summer, he appeared as an actor in Red Roc's "Hello" music video. He became the first member of BigBang to venture into acting, starring in the KBS2 drama I Am Sam, portraying the school's top fighter, Chae Musin. Despite wanting to use his stage name when acting, believing it reflects his professional side more, he is often billed with his real name, with his stage name included in parentheses. He also became a host of MBC's music program Music Core.

While promoting his group's materials in 2008, T.O.P appeared on other artists' records, including Gummy for the song "I'm Sorry" for her album Comfort, veteran singer Uhm Jung-hwa for her single "D.I.S.C.O." and ZiA for her single "I Only See You". The same year, he was admitted to Dankook University in the theatre department. The following year, T.O.P. portrayed the assassin Vick in the critically acclaimed Korean television drama Iris (2009). He also recorded the song "Hallelujah" for the drama's soundtrack with Taeyang and G-Dragon. Following Iris, T.O.P. starred in the suspense film 19-Nineteen along with fellow member Seungri. The duo released the single "Because" for the movie's soundtrack.

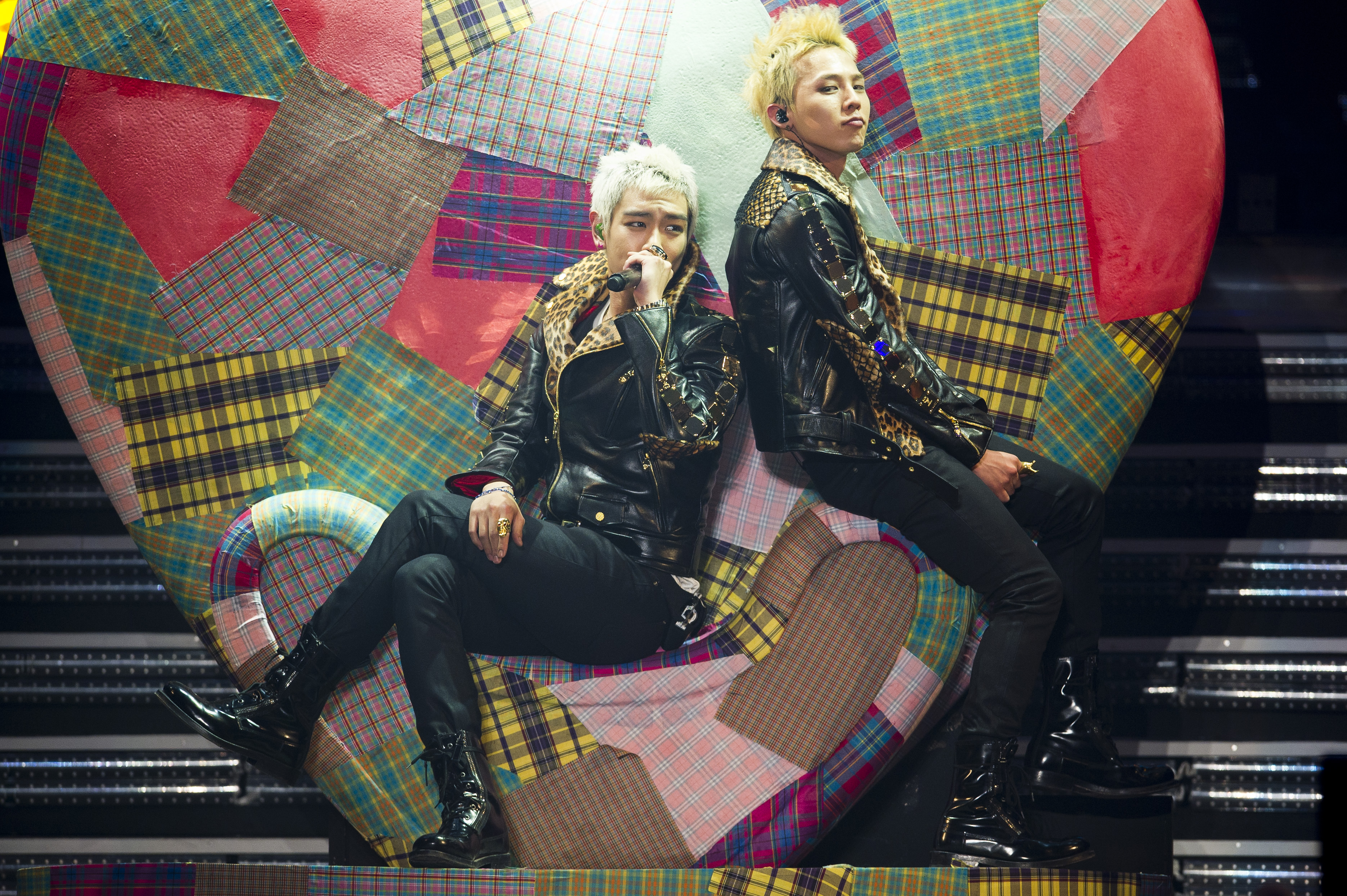
T.O.P performing with G-Dragon in 2011

T.O.P's performance in the 2010 war drama 71: Into the Fire was well-received, earning him several Best New Actor awards at local award-giving bodies. The movie also gained one million admissions in a week. Simultaneously, T.O.P began to prepare for his solo musical debut. During BigBang's Big Show Concert in January 2010, T.O.P. performed his new single "Turn It Up". Released as a digital single, it peaked at number two, and sold over 1.3 million downloads by the end of 2010.

Later that year, T.O.P and bandmate G-Dragon formed a subunit to release the album GD & TOP (2010). Prior to the release of the album, the duo held a worldwide premiere showcase for their album at Times Square in Yeongdeungpo of Seoul, South Korea, which was also broadcast live on YouTube. Three singles were released in support of the album: "High High", "Oh Yeah", and "Knock Out". All three singles preceded the release of the album and attained commercial successes: "Knock Out" was a chart topper while "Oh Yeah" and "High High" both peaked at number two and number three respectively. The album was released on Christmas Eve, and debuted at number one with 200,000 pre-ordered copies.

=== 2011–2016: Focus on acting and other ventures ===
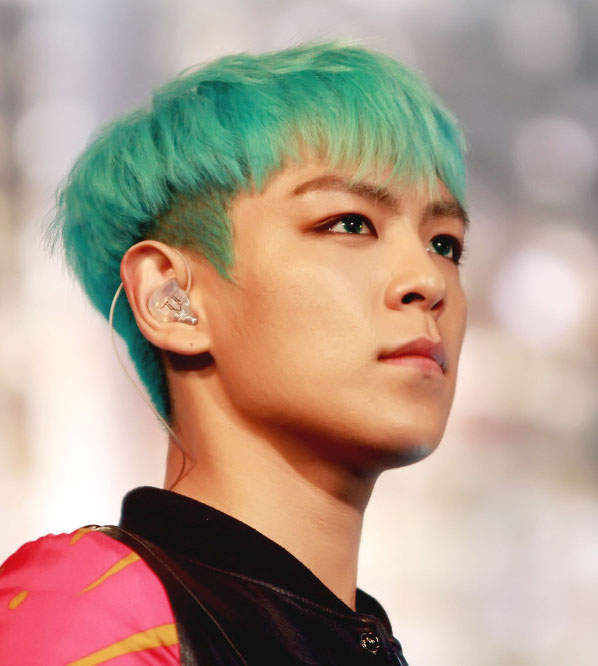
T.O.P performing in 2012

From 2011 to 2012, T.O.P was extensively involved with BigBang's promotional activities for their EPs Tonight (2011) and Alive (2012) which included a ten-month world tour that travelled to four continents. After group activities wrapped up, he focused his attention back to acting, starring in the film Commitment (2013), playing the son of a North Korean spy who is falsely accused. T.O.P first became attached to the role because he "felt sympathy for the main character, Lee Myung Hoon." While filming a combat scene for the movie, he injured the back of his hand on a glass fragment and was later admitted to the hospital for surgery. For his role, he won the Rookie Award at the Asia Star Awards, held during the Busan International Film Festival.

T.O.P was named one of the hottest sex symbols of 2013 by Rolling Stone. That November, he released his second digital single, "Doom Dada". The song was performed for the first time at the 2013 Mnet Asian Music Awards in Hong Kong. "Doom Dada" earned the #1 position on Dazed magazine's Top 10 K-Pop tracks of 2013, where it was called "inviting and alienating... it's K-Pop but sly, frenetic and slippery." He later featured on English artist Pixie Lott's Japanese album alongside G-Dragon for the song "Dancing on My Own".

In 2014, T.O.P starred in the gambling film Tazza: The Hidden Card, based on the manhwa of the same name. After debuting as a furniture designer in 2015 in collaboration with Vitra, he was awarded the Visual Culture Award at the Prudential Eye Awards. Later that year, he starred in CJ E&M's web drama The Secret Message alongside Japanese actress Juri Ueno. Despite being a rapper, he sang on the single "Hi Haruka" as part of the drama's soundtrack.

After spending the majority of 2015 touring and promoting BigBang's materials for their album Made (2016), T.O.P was cast in the German-Chinese film Out of Control alongside Hong Kong actress Cecilia Cheung. The movie is scheduled for release in China.

=== 2017–2019: Military service, personal and legal issues with marijuana usage ===
T.O.P began his two-year mandatory military service on February 9, 2017, as a conscripted police officer, where he was set to be discharged on November 8, 2018, after completing the requirements. After news broke in June that he would be prosecuted without detention for use of marijuana, T.O.P was subsequently transferred to a different police division to await notice of prosecution, and was suspended from police duty pending verdict on his case. A few days after the announcement, T.O.P was found unconscious in police barracks due to a suspected anti-anxiety medicine overdose of prescribed benzodiazepine, and was hospitalized. On June 8, T.O.P's mother confirmed that he regained consciousness and was recovering.

On June 29, at his first trial for the marijuana usage charges at the Seoul Central District Court, T.O.P pleaded guilty, admitting that he did smoke marijuana in four instances in early October 2016 and received two years of probation. After undergoing a disciplinary review by the police to decide if T.O.P should return as a conscripted policeman or complete his service as a public service officer, T.O.P was eventually assigned reservist status by the Ministry of National Defense and transferred from the police department to complete his mandatory service as a public service worker. He resumed his mandatory service as public service officer at the Yongsan Arts and Crafts Center in central Seoul on January 26, 2018. Afterwards T.O.P was discharged on July 6, 2019. His dispensation took place officially two days later.

=== 2019–present: Focus on art, departure from BigBang, and Squid Game role ===
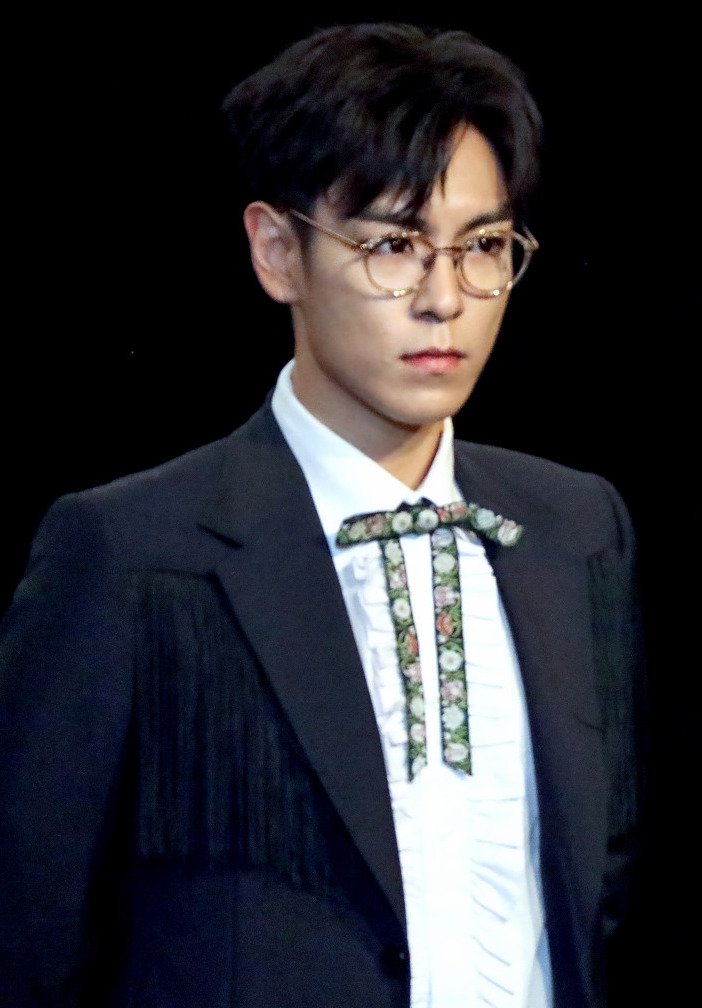
T.O.P. at the premiere for the documentary film Big Bang Made in 2016

T.O.P holds several records in the art world, becoming the first K-pop singer to be named to a list of 200 artists in the art world at Growse Magazine. On February 7, 2022, YG Entertainment announced that BigBang would make their comeback with a new song on April 5. They also announced that T.O.P ended his exclusive contract with YG Entertainment. YG announced at the time that he would continue with group activities. However, T.O.P confirmed on May 31, 2023, that he had withdrawn from the group. T.O.P. ruled out any future return to the group in January 2025, stating that his departure was final due to his past drug scandal and feeling ashamed of facing the other members.

On December 4, 2024, T.O.P was revealed as a cast member for the second season of the Netflix series Squid Game. He played Thanos, a former rapper who had fallen from grace due to a crypto scam. After auditioning, he won the role because series creator Hwang Dong-hyuk liked his "serious" approach. Hwang explained that he wanted to cast someone who had stopped working due to drug-related issues, and T.O.P had retired from K-pop and left BigBang over a marijuana conviction. To get ready for a fight scene with Yim Si-wan, both attended training to improve their chemistry together. During training, T.O.P broke some ribs. Yim later said that they stopped filming but T.O.P wanted to continue, so they resumed. When asked about Thanos' death, Hwang identified him as one of his favorite characters, believing that an "intense" death at the end of the second season was the perfect time to kill him, and that the manner in which the plot progresses in season 3 would make it feel like he is still there. T.O.P appeared one last time in the final episode, which sees a character briefly hallucinating Thanos.

The casting of T.O.P received controversy in South Korea, and his face was blurred on the Korean morning show Live This Morning when airing a segment about the series. The casting led to some viewers to believe that Lee Jung-jae, who portrayed Seong Gi-hun and was close to T.O.P, had gotten him the role, a claim that Lee denied. Netflix and Hwang received criticism for this casting for possibly setting a bad precedent. T.O.P was absent for a time from promotional events with the cast. Responding to speculation that he was removed from promotional events over the controversy, Hwang said that they planned to not have him featured from the beginning, wanting T.O.P to be able to talk about his involvement at his own pace. He felt that he had "a lot of guts" for agreeing to do the performance considering his history with drugs, and was surprised that he had still not been forgiven. He also believed that the reaction to his casting would not be reflected outside of Korea due to different legality and opinions on marijuana use in some countries. He also believed that his character may prove popular with younger viewers in Korea.

After release, his acting was criticized by those in South Korea, particularly that his vocal and facial performance was out of place, with the quality of his rap having mixed reception. Reception to Thanos and his performance was much less negative from international viewers and foreign media than from South Korean viewers, and was praised heavily by those outside of South Korea. T.O.P. continued promoting Squid Game in 2025 during FYC events for Primetime Emmy Award consideration, as he was submitted under the Supporting Actor in a Drama Series category.

On January 1, 2026, T.O.P announced his first solo full-length album titled Another Dimension. He later announced the lead single, "Studio 54", on February 12. On March 17, 2026, T.O.P announced his second single titled "Desperado". On March 20, 2026, he announced his comeback through his social media and his agency, TOPSPOT PICTURES; the first album was released digitally on April 3.

== Artistry ==
T.O.P, as a member of BigBang, has been praised for his individuality and ability to fuse a pop sound with rap, R&B and dance elements. T.O.P possesses a bass vocal range. Columnist Jeff Benjamin of Billboard K-Town noted how he is known for his low-bass timbre rapping, while fellow journalist Tamar Herman, wrote that T.O.P's rap is "an integral part to the group's sound" and that he tends to favor a "confident, almost mocking, tone". Adrienne Stanley of Kpop Starz also praised the rapper for his "speed and accuracy" when delivering bars. Both his solo releases – "Turn It Up" and "Doom Dada" – are hip hop influenced, with the latter drawing critical acclaim for its "lyrical rhythms [that] are both inviting and alienating" from Dazed magazine, that declared T.O.P was leading the evolution of K-Pop. Additionally, Billboard noted how the song's melody "is magnetizing with its whirring synths, tribal beats, and chanting, all of which pale in comparison to the rapper's aggressive, multi-tonal delivery of his verses," affirming that T.O.P "revealed his true artistry" with the song.

While working on materials with G-Dragon for their subunit, the two experimented with different styles. Co-writing majority of the lyrics, the pair noted that as "rappers [...] we'd like to tell more stories for our fans to listen." In an attempt to create their own style away from their band, the duo opted for a more hip hop sound to contrast the BigBang's current genre at the time, electronic music, though the influence of this genre along with R&B and acoustic was acknowledged. The duo also admitted to becoming "much more diverse [in their] attempts" to create their own style, preferring to mix several genres together in order to "bring out more of our character that we don't get to show when we're Big Bang."

T.O.P often edits his lyrics "more than a hundred times," and draws inspiration from "things that don't speak. [From] beautiful and pretty objects rather than people." While hip hop is his primary music consumption, he also listens to classical music and particularly enjoys the English rock band Pink Floyd. He also notes how his role as a musician influenced his acting to be more emotional. While internationally, BigBang is often referred to as a "K-pop" group, T.O.P has expressed distaste with the label noting how "[y]ou don't divide pop music by who's doing it. We don't say, for instance, 'white pop' when white people make music."

== Philanthropy ==
In August 2014, T.O.P joined the Ice Bucket Challenge, an international campaign to develop medical treatment for Lou Gehrig's disease, also known as amyotrophic lateral sclerosis (ALS). He made a donation to the Seungil Hope Foundation, a non-profit organization that provides aid to Lou Gehrig patients. In October 2016, in partnership with British auction house Sotheby's, he curated a collection of contemporary art as part of a special charity auction in Hong Kong. The project was named #TTTOP, and it featured 28 works by both Asian and Western artists. The auction saw a sale of more than HK$ 135 million and a portion of the proceeds was donated to the Asian Cultural Council (ACC) to support emerging Asian artists.

On November 4, 2018, in celebration of his birthday, T.O.P's fans from four Asian countries donated ₩11 million (US$9,900) in his name to the Yongsan Welfare Foundation to help the less fortunate.

On March 3, 2020, T.O.P., under his legal name, donated ₩100 million to the Hope Bridge National Disaster Association of Daegu, in the province of North Gyeongsang. The funds will be used to provide the medical staff of the area with personal protective equipment and to help in the fight against COVID-19.

== Personal life ==
On October 2, 2026, T.O.P's agency confirmed reports that he and actress-singer Nana are in a relationship. The pair reportedly first met while filming T.O.P's music video “Studio 54” in early January and stayed in touch, they then began dating in June 2026.

== Discography ==
- Another Dimension (2026)

== Filmography ==
=== Film ===
Title	Year	Role	Notes
Story of Men	2008	Himself	Cameo
Nineteen	2009	Seo Jeong-hun	Lead role
71: Into the Fire	2010	Oh Jang-beom	Lead role
Iris: The Movie	2011	Vick	Film adaption of Iris for Japan
Commitment	2013	Lee Myeong-hoon / Kang Dae-ho	Lead role
Tazza: The Hidden Card	2014	Ham Dae-gil	Lead role
Big Bang Made	2016	Himself	Documentary
Out of Control	2017	Tom Young	Lead role

=== Television ===
Title	Year	Role	Notes
I Am Sam	2007	Chae Mu-sin	Main cast
Iris	2009	Vick	Main cast
Haru	2010	Himself	Cameo
Secret Message	2015	Woo-hyun	Main cast
Squid Game	2024–2025	Thanos	Main (season 2); Guest (season 3)

== Awards and nominations ==
List of awards and nominations received by T.O.P
Award	Year	Category	Nominated work	Result	Ref.
Asian Film Awards	2010	Best New Actor	71: Into the Fire	Nominated	
Baeksang Arts Awards	2011	Best New Actor	71: Into the Fire	Won	
Baeksang Arts Awards	2011	Popularity Award	71: Into the Fire	Won	
Baeksang Arts Awards	2014	Popularity Award	Commitment	Nominated	
BIFF Asia Star Awards	2013	Rookie Award	Commitment	Won	
Blue Dragon Film Awards	2010	Best New Actor	71: Into the Fire	Won	
Blue Dragon Film Awards	2010	Popularity Award	71: Into the Fire	Won	
Grand Bell Awards	2010	Hallyu Popularity	71: Into the Fire	Won	
Grand Bell Awards	2010	Best New Actor	71: Into the Fire	Nominated	
Grand Bell Awards	2015	Popularity Award	Tazza: The Hidden Card	Nominated	
KBS Drama Awards	2009	Best New Actor	Iris	Nominated	
Korean Film Awards	2010	Best New Actor	71: Into the Fire	Nominated	
Max Movie Awards	2010	Best New Actor	71: Into the Fire	Won	
Prudential Eye Awards	2015	Visual Culture Award	T.O.P	Won	
Singapore Entertainment Awards	2014	Most Popular K-pop Music Video	"Doom Dada"	Nominated	
Style Icon Awards	2010	New Icon (Movie)	71: Into the Fire	Won	
Gold Derby TV Awards	2025	Best Supporting Actor	Squid Game 2	Won	

== Proposed spaceflight ==
After applying, in 2022, T.O.P was selected to participate in a lunar spaceflight as part of the DearMoon project crew. The mission was scheduled to occur in 2023 aboard the SpaceX Starship. The project was cancelled in 2024, with organizers citing delays to the Starship program as the reason for the cancellation.
