= Jinu =

American rapper

- 김진우
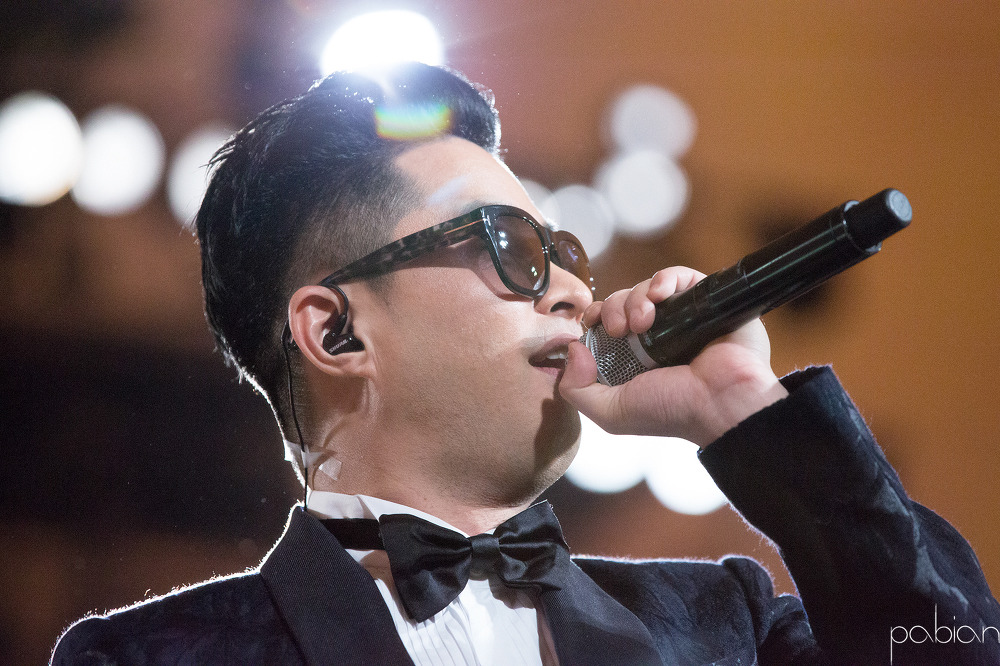
- Jinu in 2015
- Born: Kim Jin-woo; October 23, 1971 (age 55); California, United States
- Education: Louisiana State University
- Occupations: Rapper; singer; songwriter; entrepreneur
- Spouse: Kim Jun-hee (m. 2006; div. 2008)
- Musical career
- Genres: K-pop; R&B; hip hop
- Years active: 1994–present
- Label: YG Entertainment
- Formerly of: YG Family; Jinusean
- Website: JINUSEAN

- Korean name
- Hangul: 김진우
- RR: Gim Jinu
- MR: Kim Chinu

Kim Jin-woo (Korean: 김진우; born October 23, 1971), known professionally as Jinu (지누), is an American rapper, singer, songwriter, and entrepreneur. He debuted in 1994 as a solo singer before teaming up with Sean to create a hip-hop duo Jinusean in 1997 under YG Entertainment.

== Early life ==
Kim Jin-woo was born in California. He is fluent in English and Korean.

== Career ==
=== 1994: Solo debut ===
On March 9, 1994, Kim released his first album Kim Jin Woo Vol.1 with "I Am Awesome" (나는 캡이었어) as his first single. After hearing about his album, Yang Hyun-suk, former Seo Taiji and Boys' member, picked Kim to be in a hip hop duo under his label, YG Entertainment with Sean.

=== 1997: Jinusean debut ===
Jinu and Sean debuted as Jinusean with the single, "Gasoline," in 1997 under the guidance of YG Entertainment CEO and former Seo Taiji and Boys member Yang Hyun-suk and former Deux member Lee Hyun Do. Their second single, "Tell Me" (featuring singer Uhm Jung-hwa), was the duo's first hit and propelled them to stardom.

=== 2004–present: Extended hiatus and Work at YG Entertainment ===
Between 2004 and 2014, the duo went on an extended hiatus. They remained at YG Entertainment working in various behind-the-scenes roles. Jinu was appointed as the Director of Overseas Operations. He was in charge of matters overseas including auditions and concerts. He discovered Bobby of iKon in New York then brought him to Korea to train under YG Entertainment.

In 2014, Jinusean made his first appearance in 10 years on a Korean variety TV show called Infinite Challenge. In 2015, they released the single "Tell Me One More Time" which marked the end of their hiatus.

As of 2018, Jinu is confirmed to star in a new series by Netflix and YG Entertainment, YG Future Strategy Office.

== Personal life ==
On May 14, 2006, Jinu married actress Kim Jun-hee. They divorced in 2008, after two years of marriage due to irreconcilable differences.

Kim is a Christian.

== Discography ==
=== Solo album ===
Year	Album information	Track listing
1994	Kim Jin Woo Vol.1: Released: March 9, 1994; Label: RIAK; Language: Korean	Track listing: 1. Mo' Bass (Instrumental); 2. I was Awesome; 3. Dangerous Curiosity (The Innocence of Desire); 4. Escape; 5. Farewell Alone; 6. Blue Sunday (Interlude); 7. Afternoon with Freesia Scent; 8. Automatic Responding Telephone; 9. Trial and Error; 10. Can't See You Again; 11. Sweet Dream (Outro); 12. Dangerous Curiosity

=== Singles ===
==== As a lead artist ====
Title	Year	Sales	Album
"I Am Awesome"	1994	—N/a	Kim Jin Woo Vol.1

==== As a featured artist ====
Title	Year	Sales	Album
"가요 톱 10" (Turbo featuring. Lee Ha-neul, Jinu, and Lee Sang-min)	2015	—N/a	10집 Again

== Filmography ==
Year	Channel	Title	Role	Note
2014-2015	MBC	Infinite Challenge	Himself	Saturday, Saturday's: I am a Singer
2015	Mnet	Show Me the Money 4	Judge	Team YG (with Sean of Jinusean and Tablo)
2017	SBS	Fantastic Duo 2	Himself	with Sean of Jinusean
2018	Netflix	YG Future Strategy Office	Cast member	
