= Lexy (singer) =

South Korean singer

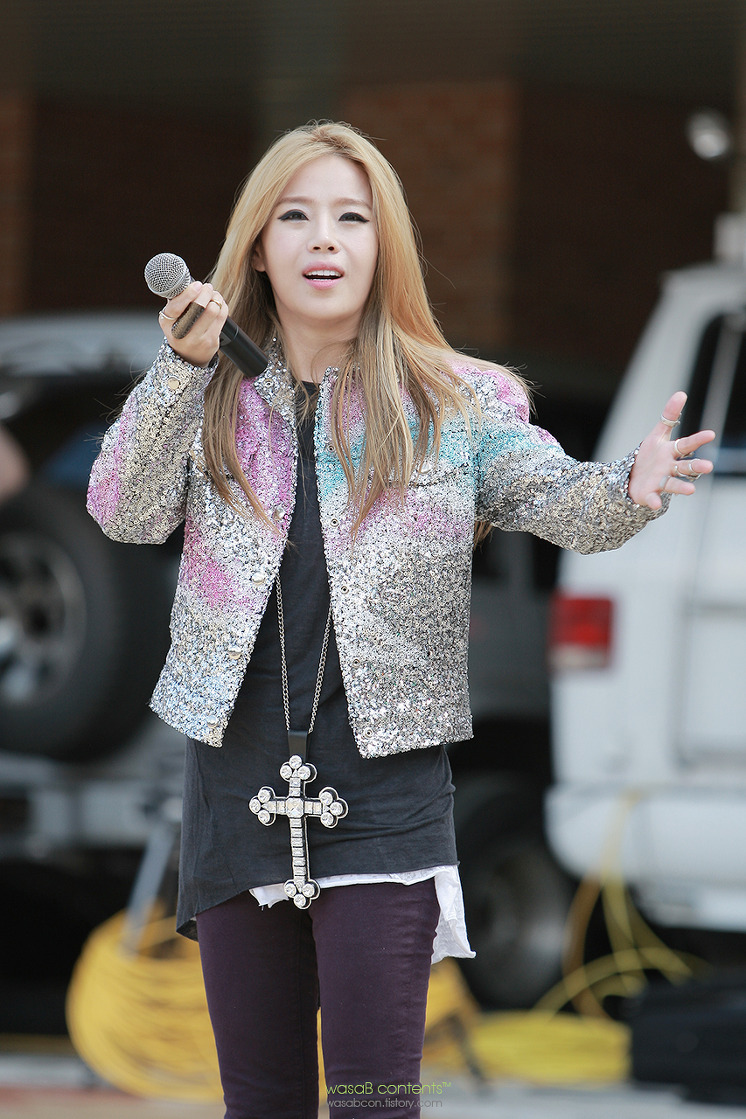
- Lexy in 2014

Background information
- Also known as: Lexy
- Born: Hwang Hyo-sook; May 3, 1977 (age 49)
- Genres: R&B; Hip hop
- Occupations: Singer; rapper
- Years active: 2003–present
- Labels: YG Entertainment; Sony BMG

Hwang Hyo-sook (Korean: 황효숙; born May 3, 1977), better known by her stage name Lexy (Hangul: 렉시), is a South Korean singer and rapper who debuted in 2003 under YG Entertainment. She was the first solo female rap artist to debut under the company.

== Career ==
=== 2003—present: Career beginnings, YG Entertainment, debut album and label changes ===
Lexy has been featured in songs with many other YG artists, such as Se7en, 1TYM, Jinusean and Wheesung. She was marketed by YG as a hip-hop artist with a little mix of R&B vibe as well. Her debut album, LEXURY (released on October 6, 2003), was fairly well received and with her growing popularity she became a rival with popular singer Lee Hyori for a while. Though her debut album was well received, her second album Lextacy (released on August 26, 2005) didn't achieve as much commercial success when it was released and due to the poor sales it prompted a decision by YG Entertainment to not renew her contract. It was mutually decided that there wouldn't be a re-signing of her contract, but they still wanted to carry out the third album. Titled RUSH, it was released on April 18, 2007, and was on the charts for a few weeks, thanks to her title song "Above The Sky", but the album sales were still not as strong as her debut album.

On September 12, 2007, when Yang Hyun Suk announced that Lexy left YG Entertainment, as signing with the agency did not happen, he also revealed that because of that, he felt like he was giving away his younger sister for marriage. Lexy's contract actually ended in October 2006. There has been no problems on money or ill-feelings toward both parties. It was just decided they would go on separate ways.

On Lexy's first album, LEXURY, Teddy Park of 1TYM composed the song "Let Me Dance" and Song Baek Kyoung, also from 1TYM, composed the song "Up And Down".

After transferring to SB&W Entertainment (joint venture of Sony BMG (now Sony Music) & now-defunct SK Telecom subsidiary WiderThan), Lexy released a new album, THE LEXY, featuring few hip hop artists such as Crown J and VOS. The album consisted of different music style by Lexy going more on the electronic hip hop genre, plus ballads and jazz and was released on March 24, 2008.

In February 2012, Lexy blogged about her return to the music industry and her scheduled 6th album release in August.

== Discography ==
=== Studio albums ===
Title	Album details	Peak chart positions	Sales
Title	Album details	KOR	Sales
Lexury	Released: October 6, 2003; Label: YG Entertainment; Formats: CD, cassette; Track listing: 1. Lextro; 2. 맹세; 3. 내게서 벗어나 (feat. Big Mama); 4. Up and Down (Clubin') (feat. Gummy); 5. Let Me Dance (feat. Teddy); 6. 애송이 (feat. Psy); 7. 클레오파트라; 8. 잊어줄께; 9. Lexylude; 10. Move; 11. Girls; 12. Tomboy; 13. Baby Come On (feat. Perry); 14. 빠져 나와 (feat. Danny & Teddy); 15. 너를 사랑해 (feat. Jinu); 16. Real Love; 17. Outro	9	KOR: 89,765+
Lextacy	Released: July 25, 2005; Label: YG Entertainment; Formats: CD, cassette; Track listing: 1. 눈물 씻고 화장하고; 2. 그만 그만 (feat. Kim Ji Eun); 3. Animal; 4. Get Out; 5. Hey Everybody (feat. Gummy & Perry); 6. Oh Yeah; 7. Every Day; 8. 내일 걱정은 내일 해 (feat. Stony Skunk); 9. Party; 10. Touch Me; 11. 너를 잊으리 (Interlude); 12. 기꺼이 (feat. Gummy); 13. L.E.X.Y. (Bonus Track)	14	KOR: 25,505+
Rush	Released: April 19, 2007; Label: YG Entertainment; Formats: CD, cassette; Track listing: 1. Get Up (Intro) (feat. Taeyang); 2. Rush (feat. Taeyang); 3. 쿵쿵 (Kung Kung); 4. 하늘 위로 (feat. Kim Ji Eun); 5. Baby Boy (feat. Park Bom); 6. Hit This Party (feat. Kim Ji Eun); 7. Super Fly (feat. T.O.P, G-Dragon, Taeyang); 8. Get That (feat. Perry); 9. Left To The Right (feat. Masta Wu); 10. Big Lexy; 11. 하늘 위로 (Remix)	—	—N/a
The Lexy	Released: March 17, 2008; Label: SB&W Entertainment, Sony BMG; Formats: CD; Track listing: 1. I Told Ya! (Intro); 2. Ma People; 3. Don't Lie; 4. Let Me Dance 2 (feat. Hyun Jun); 5. Immature Girl; 6. Tonight; 7. 번호를 지워; 8. Selfish Love; 9. 두사람; 10. 난 여자라; 11. Don't Lie (Remix)	10	KOR: 4,588+
"—" denotes releases that did not chart or were not released in that region

=== Singles ===
Ano	Title	Peak chart positions	Sales	Album
Ano	Title	KOR	Sales	Album
2003	"Ae song" (애송이)	—	N/A	Lexury
2005	"Tears" (눈물씻고 화장하고)	—	N/A	Lextacy
2007	"Above the Sky" (하늘위로 (Remix))	—	N/A	Rush
2008	"Ma People"	—	N/A	The Lexy
2012	"NOLZA" (놀자 feat. JC Jieun)	32	191,944	Non-album single
"—" denotes releases that did not chart or were not released in that region

=== Participation in albums ===
Year	Artist(s)	Title	Album
1997	Jinusean feat. Perry, Lexy	"Jinusean Bomb"	Jinusean
1999	YG Family (Yang Goon & Lexy)	"Hurry Up"	Famillenium
1999	Yoon Hee-jung feat. Lexy	"Sad Destiny" (슬픈 인연)	3534
1999	Yoon Hee-jung feat. Lexy	"Poet Designer (Real Mc)"	3534
1999	Yoon Hee-jung feat. Lexy	"Camp 30"	3534
1999	YG Family (Jinusean (feat. Perry, Lexy, YJP))	"JS-REMIX YG Bounce"	Y.G Best of Album
2001	Jinusean feat. Masta Wu, Lexy	"HIPHOP" (힙合)	The Reign
2001	Perry feat. Jinusean, Danny, Masta Wu, Lexy	"Get Ready"	Perry By Storm
2001	Perry feat. Lexy	"Baby Come On"	Perry By Storm
2002	Swi.T feat. Lexy	"Go"	Swi.T
2002	Rain feat. Danny, Lexy, Byul, and JYP	"What's Love"	Bad Guy
2002	YG Family (Jinusean, Danny of 1TYM, Lexy, G-Dragon, Wheesung)	"YMCA Baseball Team" (YMCA 야구단)	Why Be Normal?
2002	YG Family (Jinusean, 1TYM, G-Dragon & Lexy)	"A-YO!"	Why Be Normal?
2003	Seven feat. Wheesung & Lexy	"Luz control"	Just Listen
2003	1TYM feat. Lexy	"OK"	ONCE N 4 ALL
2004	Wanted Narration Masta Wu, Lexy	"Naneun" (나는)	Like The First
2004	Gummy feat. Lexy, Jinu	"Round 1"	It's Different
2004	Jinusean feat. Lexy	"Welcome"	Let's Play (노.라.보.세.)
2005	Psy	"Girls" (사노라면)	Remake & Mix 18 Beon
2006	YG Family (Lexy)	"Ae song" (애송이)	YG 10th
2006	YG Family (Lexy)	"Tears" (눈물씻고 화장하고)	YG 10th

=== Music videos ===
Year	Music video
2003	"Ae song (애송이 feat. Psy)"
2003	"Let Me Dance (feat. Teddy)"
2003	"Girls"
2003	"4th (맹세)"
2005	"Tears (涙を拭いて化粧して)"
2007	"Sky (空の上に)"
2008	"Ma People"
2012	"NOLZA (feat. JC Jieun)"

== Awards ==
=== Mnet Asian Music Awards ===
Year	Category	Work	Result
2003	Best New Female Artist	"Grasshopper" (애송이)	Nominated
2005	Best Female Artist	"Tears" (눈물 씻고 화장하고)	Nominated
2007	Best House & Electronic	"Above The Sky"	Nominated
