= Blue Moon World Tour =

2013–14 concert tour by CNBLUE

2013 CNBLUE Blue Moon World Tour
- World tour by CNBLUE
- Promotional poster for the tour
- Associated album: Re:Blue
- Start date: 6 April 2013
- End date: 31 January 2014

CNBLUE concert chronology
- CNBLUE Live : Blue Night in Seoul (2012); Blue Moon World Tour (2013)

2013 CNBLUE Blue Moon World Tour was the 2013 live concert tour of South Korean rock band CNBLUE in support of their fifth EP, Re:Blue, which was released on 14 January 2013. The world tour commenced, at the conclusion of promotional activities in South Korea, with one show in Taiwan in April 2013 and scheduled concerts for Singapore, Thailand, Hong Kong, South Korea, Australia, Philippines and Malaysia, thru August 2013. Subsequent concert dates added China and Indonesia; and extended the tour into January 2014, for concerts in the United States, Mexico, Peru, and the final concert in Chile, for a total of 20 concerts in 14 countries and 18 cities.

== Background ==
The tour was announced on 23 January 2013, by FNC Entertainment, with the official poster released on 28 February. This marked the band's first world live tour following their joint concert with labelmates FT Island in Los Angeles, USA in May 2012 and exclusive concert at IndigO2 in London in September 2012.

In March 2013 FNC Entertainment announced they were in negotiations for concerts in China, namely Beijing and Shanghai, Europe, North America and South America, which would make the band the first South Korean rock band to hold a world tour of this kind.

== Concerts ==
The Australian concerts marked the first time the band performed solo in Sydney and Melbourne, also the first Korean band to do so. The tickets for the 11 May Hong Kong concert went on sale 11 March and the 7,000 tickets were sold out within five minutes. An additional show on 10 May was added and tickets went on sale on 20 March. An extra show in Malaysia was added after tickets for the Singapore concert were sold out.

The first concert of the world tour in Taipei was played to an audience of 11,000 people, where the band played 24 tracks. During a press conference held on 5 April, leader Jung Yong-hwa performed an acoustic version of his self-composed lead track "I′m Sorry" from EP Re:Blue. The two concerts in Hong Kong were played to an audience of 15,000 people, where the band celebrated Lee Jong-hyun′s birthday on the second and last day of the concerts.

The tour continued into 2014, and the year's first concert was in New York City in Times Square. It was the band's first United States solo concert and their first concert on the East Coast. The 21 January date coincided with a major snowstorm, and the band worried about fans waiting outside in lines. The city's DramaFever's coverage included photos, and a review that referred to the band member's participation as actors in Korean drama or k-drama for Television in South Korea, and noted Jung Yong-hwa's "flawless English." In their only pre-concert interview, with Billboard K-Town, Lee Jung-shin said that the strong chart showing and sales of EP Re:Blue gave them the opportunity for the world tour and the trip to the U.S. Jung Yong-hwa, who wore a guitar strap with an American flag design, said the band had dreamed of playing New York City for a long time and was glad it was happening. The band discussed their comparisons to America's Maroon 5 and Jason Mraz; and influences of Bruno Mars and Kings of Leon, as they are recording new music. The band had a photo shoot and interview session with the city's MTV K and did additional photo shoots in Times Square and on the Brooklyn Bridge, which were used for a teaser campaign for their fifth mini album Can't Stop. The first and second teaser photos were entitled "Before Sunset in NY" and "Before Midnight in NY."

For the second leg of their U.S. tour, the band made a return visit to Los Angeles, having done a previous concert there with F.T. Island in 2012. Their interview with Dumbfoundead aired as a special on Mnet America's show, "Danny From LA", hosted by Danny Im and Dumbfoundead. During questions and answers, Lee Jong-hyun said that the hardest part of being in a rock band was headbanging, stating "after the New York concert, my body is still aching." Kang Min-hyuk explained the meaning behind the name of the tour, that like a Blue moon which is rare to see, "we wanted this concert to be, a more special and meaningful tour." Mnet America aired an additional special of the band, "Mnet America Headliner Special #5 – CNBLUE", which referenced both U.S. concerts; with footage of the New York City snowstorm on concert day, and panel members noting the attraction of a variety of fans to the band, "ages from 12 through 79", both male and female. The panelists note the band's love of American music, their similarity to Maroon 5, and their greatest inspirations, Jon Bon Jovi and Great Britain's Eric Clapton.

The Mexico City concert was the band's first concert in Mexico, with an audience of 6,000. In an interview on 26 January, the band said that, due to their skills as musicians, they had received encouraging reviews and good sales in countries of Latin America. They said they were willing to learn more Spanish and collaborate with Spanish speaking musicians. The band spoke Spanish to the audience, Jung Yong-hwa called "Mamacitas" to them, and the audience blew soap bubbles during the song "Love Light". The band said, "We are thankful and amazed by the fact that there are fans who like our music, even though they are half the world away from us. We were impressed by their passionate response to our performance."

The concert in Lima, Peru was another first for the band. The city's newspaper, El Comercio, covered the event, documenting the growing popularity of k-pop in Peru, from JYJ's 2012 concert, thru 2013's list of shows, which included Super Junior and Kim Hyun Joong, among others. The articles cite differences with previous k-pop's scenic choreographies and CN Blue's live music, played by musicians. The band chose Peru, along with Mexico and Chile, where record sales had peaked. Local media filmed videos of fans singing the band's songs, dressed in traditional Peruvian clothing for the airport greeting, and an announcement of the band's travel plans (visits to an art museum, Government Palace, Park of the Exposition's gardens and a local restaurant). The city's k-pop internet radio station, Radio Kpopway's DJ, videoed some of the concert for YouTube. Events included a press conference and a promotional fan Meet and Greet. The concert was listed in About.com's Peru Travel section, stating that South Korean rock and pop bands were coming to Lima in increasing numbers. A late concert venue change took the concert to the busy vacation area of Costa Verde, Miraflores District, which made Lee Jong-hyun happy, as he said the beach reminded him of his birthplace city of Busan.

The last concert of the tour was 31 January 2014, in Santiago, Chile, where the band arrived in time to enjoy the Lunar New Year with traditional rice cake soup Tteokguk. This was the first solo Chilean concert for the band, who had performed in Viña del Mar in 2012 with the Music Bank World Tour. Having arrived on 29 January, the band toured the capital city and took photos with some lucky fans. After the show, Lee Jong-hyun and Jung Yong-hwa posted Twitter messages of thanks to the Chilean fans, blessings for the New Year, and gratitude to all the fans who supported their World Tour.

== Media ==
On 26 September 2013, the band released their first photo book since their debut, "Blue Travel," 180-pages (along with DVD of making), featuring the band in Sydney, one of the two Australian venues in the tour. The photos represent the members' four different styles with themes called 'Nostalgia,' 'Shelter,' 'Experience,' and 'Healing.' Preorders began on 5 September, and on both 8 and 9 September, the release ranked number one on Japan's HMV and Tower Records charts and on 9 September, ranked number one on Korea's Kyobo Book Centre order chart.

On 24 February 2014, Mnet America released a video documentary series, "Go! CNBLUE" with footage from the tour's concerts and behind-the-scenes in New York City, Los Angeles, and Mexico City. Lee Jung-shin narrates, with English subtitles.

On 30 April 2014, the band released videos of the tour on their official YouTube channel, with footage by individual band members. On 14 May, the band released another 110-page photo book of the entire 18 city tour, "CNBLUE WORLD TOUR [BLUE MOON] MAKING BOOK", including two DVDs 'Special Interview' and 'World Tour Making Film', in Korean and Japanese versions.

== Setlist ==
Taiwan (6 April 2013)

Main Set

1. "Opening"
2. "Where You Are"
3. "Get Away"
4. "One Time"
5. "Naran Namja"
6. "Coffee Shop"
7. "Have A Good Night"
8. "Wake Up"
9. "More Than You"
10. "Love Light"
11. "Y, Why..."
12. "Feeling"
13. "These Days"
14. "LaLaLa"
15. "Just Please"
16. "Tattoo"
17. "In My Head"
18. "Intuition"
19. "I'm A Loner"

Encore

1. "I'm Sorry"
2. "Hey You"
3. "Love Girl"
4. "You've Fallen For Me"
5. "Love"
6. "Try Again, Smile again"
7. "I'm Sorry" (Sang with audience)
Singapore (13 April 2013)

Main Set

1. "Opening"
2. "Where You Are"
3. "Get Away"
4. "One Time"
5. "Naran Namja"
6. "Coffee Shop"
7. "Have A Good Night"
8. "Wake Up"
9. "Love Light" (Mobile phone torchlight fan project)
10. "Feeling"
11. "These Days (Korean version)"
12. "Y,Why (Korean version)"
13. "LaLaLa"
14. "Just Please (Korean version)"
15. "Tattoo"
16. "In My Head (Korean version)"
17. "Intuition"
18. "I'm A Loner"
19. "I'm Sorry"

Encore

1. "Hey You"
2. "Love Girl"
3. "You've Fallen For Me"
4. "Love"
5. "Adlib Song (About Singapore)"
6. "Try Again, Smile again" ("I miss you" fan event)
Thailand (4 May 2013)

Main Set

1. "Opening"
2. "Where You Are"
3. "Get Away"
4. "One Time"
5. "Man like Me"
6. "Coffee Shop"
7. "Have A Good Night"
8. "Wake Up"
9. "Love Light" (HBD Lee Jonghyun Project)
10. "Feeling"
11. "These Days"
12. "Y,Why"
13. "La La La"
14. "Just Please"
15. "Tattoo"
16. "In My Head"
17. "Intuition"
18. "I'm A Loner"
19. "I'm Sorry"

Encore

1. "Hey You"
2. "Love Girl"
3. "You've Fallen For Me"
4. "Love"
5. "Try Again, Smile again"
Hong Kong (11 May 2013)

Main Set

1. "Opening"
2. "Where You Are"
3. "Get Away"
4. "One Time"
5. "Man like Me"
6. "Coffee Shop"
7. "Have A Good Night"
8. "Wake Up"
9. "Love Light"
10. "Feeling"
11. "These Days"
12. "Y,Why"
13. "La La La"
14. "Just Please"
15. "Tattoo"
16. "In My Head"
17. "Intuition"
18. "I'm A Loner"
19. "I'm Sorry"

Encore

1. "Hey You"
2. "Love Girl"
3. "You've Fallen For Me"
4. "Love"
5. "Try Again, Smile again"
Seoul (25 May 2013)

Main Set

1. "Opening"
2. "Where You Are"
3. "Get Away"
4. "One Time"
5. "Man like Me"
6. "Coffee Shop"
7. "Have A Good Night"
8. "Wake Up"
9. "Love Light"
10. "Feeling"
11. "These Days" (Kor. ver)
12. "Y,Why" (Kor. ver)
13. "La La La"
14. "Just Please" (Kor. ver)
15. "Tattoo"
16. "In My Head" (Kor. ver)
17. "Intuition"
18. "I'm A Loner"
19. "I'm Sorry"

Encore

1. "Hey You"
2. "Love Girl"
3. Impromptu Song
4. "You've Fallen For Me"
5. "Love"
6. "Try Again, Smile again"
Seoul (26 May 2013)

Main Set

1. "Opening"
2. "Where You Are"
3. "Get Away"
4. "One Time"
5. "Man like Me"
6. "Coffee Shop"
7. "Have A Good Night"
8. "Wake Up"
9. "Love Light"
10. "Feeling"
11. "These Days" (Kor. ver)
12. "Y,Why" (Kor. ver)
13. "La La La"
14. "Just Please" (Kor. ver)
15. "Tattoo"
16. "In My Head" (Kor. ver)
17. "Intuition"
18. "I'm A Loner"
19. "I'm Sorry"

Encore

1. "Hey You"
2. "Love Girl"
3. Impromptu Song
4. "You've Fallen For Me"
5. "Love"
6. "Try Again, Smile again"

2nd Encore

1. "Home"
2. "These Days"
3. "I'm Sorry"
Australia – Melbourne (31 May 2013)

Main Set

1. "Opening"
2. "Where You Are"
3. "Get Away"
4. "One Time"
5. "Man like Me"
6. "Coffee Shop"
7. "Have A Good Night"
8. "Wake Up"
9. "Love Light"
10. "Feeling"
11. "These Days"
12. "Y,Why"
13. "La La La"
14. "Just Please"
15. "Tattoo"
16. "In My Head"
17. "Intuition"
18. "I'm A Loner"
19. "I'm Sorry"

Encore

1. "Hey You"
2. "Love Girl"
3. "You've Fallen For Me"
4. "Love"
5. "Try Again, Smile again"
Australia – Sydney (1 June 2013)

Main Set

1. "Opening"
2. "Where You Are"
3. "Get Away"
4. "One Time"
5. "Man like Me"
6. "Coffee Shop"
7. "Have A Good Night"
8. "Wake Up"
9. "Love Light"
10. "Feeling"
11. "These Days"
12. "Y,Why"
13. "La La La"
14. "Just Please"
15. "Tattoo"
16. "In My Head"
17. "Intuition"
18. "I'm A Loner"
19. "I'm Sorry"

Encore

1. "Hey You"
2. "Love Girl"
3. "You've Fallen For Me"
4. "Love"
5. "Try Again, Smile again"
Philippines (15 June 2013)

Main Set

1. "Opening"
2. "Where You Are"
3. "Get Away"
4. "One Time"
5. "Man like Me"
6. "Coffee Shop"
7. "Have A Good Night"
8. "Wake Up"
9. "Love Light"
10. "Feeling"
11. "These Days"
12. "Y,Why"
13. "La La La"
14. "Just Please"
15. "Tattoo"
16. "In My Head"
17. "Intuition"
18. "I'm A Loner"
19. "I'm Sorry"

Encore

1. "Hey You"
2. "Love Girl"
3. "Adlib song"
4. "You've Fallen For Me"
5. "Love"
6. "Try Again, Smile again"
Kuala Lumpur – Malaysia (24 August 2013)

Main Set

1. "Opening"
2. "Where You Are"
3. "Get Away"
4. "One Time"
5. "Man like Me"
6. "Coffee Shop"
7. "Have A Good Night"
8. "Wake Up"
9. "Love Light"
10. "Feeling"
11. "These Days"
12. "Y,Why (Kor Ver)"
13. "La La La"
14. "Just Please"
15. "Tattoo"
16. "In My Head"
17. "Intuition"
18. "I'm A Loner"
19. "I'm Sorry"

Encore

1. "Hey You"
2. "Feel Good"
3. "Love Girl"
4. "Adlib song"
5. "You've Fallen For Me"
6. "Love"
7. "Try Again, Smile again (English Ver)"
Jakarta – Indonesia (19 October 2013)

Main Set

1. "Opening"
2. "Where You Are"
3. "Get Away"
4. "One Time"
5. "Man like Me"
6. "Coffee Shop"
7. "Have A Good Night"
8. "Wake Up"
9. "Love Light"
10. "Feeling"
11. "These Days"
12. "Y,Why (Kor Ver)"
13. "La La La"
14. "Just Please"
15. "Tattoo"
16. "In My Head"
17. "Intuition"
18. "I'm A Loner"
19. "I'm Sorry"

Encore

1. "Hey You"
2. "Love Girl"
3. "Adlib song – Feel Good"
4. "You've Fallen For Me"
5. "Love"
6. "Try Again, Smile again (English Ver)"
United States – New York City (21 January 2014)

Main Set

1. "Opening"
2. "Where You Are"
3. "Get Away"
4. "One Time"
5. "Man like Me"
6. "Coffee Shop"
7. "Have A Good Night"
8. "Wake Up"
9. "Love Light"
10. "Feeling"
11. "These Days"
12. "Y,Why (Kor Ver)"
13. "Just Please"
14. "Tattoo"
15. "In My Head"
16. "Intuition"
17. "I'm A Loner"
18. "I'm Sorry"

Encore

1. "Hey You"
2. "Love Girl"
3. "You've Fallen For Me"
4. "Love"
5. "Try Again, Smile again (English Ver)"
United States – Los Angeles (24 January 2014)

Main Set

1. "Opening"
2. "Where You Are"
3. "Get Away"
4. "One Time"
5. "Man like Me"
6. "Coffee Shop"
7. "Have A Good Night"
8. "Wake Up"
9. "Love Light"
10. "Feeling"
11. "These Days"
12. "Y,Why (Kor Ver)"
13. "Just Please"
14. "Tattoo"
15. "In My Head"
16. "Intuition"
17. "I'm A Loner"
18. "I'm Sorry"

Encore

1. "Hey You"
2. "Love Girl"
3. "You've Fallen For Me"
4. "Love"
5. "Try Again, Smile again (English Ver)"
Mexico – Mexico City (26 January 2014)

Main Set

1. "Opening"
2. "Where You Are"
3. "Get Away"
4. "One Time"
5. "Man like Me"
6. "Coffee Shop"
7. "Have A Good Night"
8. "Wake Up"
9. "Love Light"
10. "Feeling"
11. "These Days"
12. "Y,Why (Kor Ver)"
13. "Just Please"
14. "Tattoo"
15. "In My Head"
16. "Intuition"
17. "I'm A Loner"
18. "I'm Sorry"

Encore

1. "Hey You"
2. "Love Girl"
3. "You've Fallen For Me"
4. "Love"
5. "Try Again, Smile again (English Ver)"
Peru – Lima (28 January 2014)

Main Set

1. "Opening"
2. "Where You Are"
3. "Get Away"
4. "One Time"
5. "Man like Me"
6. "Coffee Shop"
7. "Have A Good Night"
8. "Wake Up"
9. "Love Light"
10. "Feeling"
11. "These Days"
12. "Y,Why (Kor Ver)"
13. "Just Please"
14. "Tattoo"
15. "In My Head"
16. "Intuition"
17. "I'm A Loner"
18. "I'm Sorry"

Encore

1. "Hey You"
2. "Love Girl"
3. "You've Fallen For Me"
4. "Love"
5. "Try Again, Smile again (English Ver)"
Chile – Santiago (31 January 2014)

Main Set

1. "Opening"
2. "Where You Are"
3. "Get Away"
4. "One Time"
5. "Man like Me"
6. "Coffee Shop"
7. "Have A Good Night"
8. "Wake Up"
9. Special Stage "Love Me Tender" (Elvis Presley Cover)
10. "Love Light"
11. "Feeling"
12. "These Days"
13. "Y,Why (Kor Ver)"
14. "Just Please"
15. "Tattoo"
16. "In My Head"
17. "Intuition"
18. "I'm A Loner"
19. "I'm Sorry"

Encore

1. "Hey You"
2. "Love Girl"
3. "You've Fallen For Me"
4. "Love"
5. "Try Again, Smile again"
6. "I'm Sorry" (Sang with audience)

== Tour dates ==
Date	City	Country	Venue	Attendance
Asia
6 April 2013	Taipei	Taiwan	Taipei Arena	11,000
13 April 2013	Singapore		Singapore Indoor Stadium	6,500
4 May 2013	Bangkok	Thailand	Impact Arena	10,000
10 May 2013	Hong Kong	China	AsiaWorld–Arena	15,000
11 May 2013	Hong Kong	China	AsiaWorld–Arena	15,000
25 May 2013	Seoul	South Korea	Jamsil Indoor Stadium	12,000
26 May 2013	Seoul	South Korea	Jamsil Indoor Stadium	12,000
Australia
31 May 2013	Melbourne	Australia	Festival Hall	—
1 June 2013	Sydney	Australia	Big Top Sydney	—
Asia
15 June 2013	Quezon City	Philippines	Araneta Coliseum	4,000
29 June 2013	Beijing	China	Beijing Capital Gymnasium	8,000
24 August 2013	Kuala Lumpur	Malaysia	Stadium Negara	4,500
7 September 2013	Guangzhou	China	Guangzhou International Sports Arena	7,500
30 September 2013	Shanghai	China	Shanghai Indoor Stadium	7,000
19 October 2013	Jakarta	Indonesia	Tennis Indoor Senayan	—
North America
21 January 2014	New York City	United States	Best Buy Theater	—
24 January 2014	Los Angeles	United States	Pasadena Civic Auditorium	—
Latin America
26 January 2014	Mexico City	Mexico	Pepsi Center WTC	6,000
28 January 2014	Lima	Peru	Costa Verde Magdalena	—
31 January 2014	Santiago	Chile	Movistar Arena	—
Estimated total				91,500

== Personnel ==
- Musician: CNBLUE
- Tour organizer: FNC Entertainment
