= 1TYM =

South Korean hip hop group

- Origin: South Korea
- Genres: K-pop, hip hop
- Years active: 1998–2006; 2008
- Label: YG Entertainment
- Formerly of: YG Family
- Members: Oh Jinhwan; Teddy; Song Baekyoung; Danny

1TYM (Korean: 원타임, pronounced as "One Time") was a four-member South Korean group. They were Teddy Park (also known as Park Hong-jun), Oh Jinhwan, Song Baekyoung, and Danny Im (also known as Im Taebin).

== History ==
In the late 1990s, YG CEO Yang Hyun Suk had his trainees perform as a group named MF family which was named after an apparel brand called Majah Flavah! created by Sean of the Korean hiphop group Jinusean. The group initially had seven members, which three of them later departed. They originally participated in the song "No more" (이제 더 이상) in the album "The Real" by Jinusean as a featured artist in January 1998.

Teddy and Danny grew up in Los Angeles and were discovered there when they were teenagers by a producer who worked with Yang Hyun-suk. After auditioning for Yang, the two were signed to his new label, YG Entertainment, and moved to South Korea. The main producer of YG Entertainment at the time, Perry, came up with the group name “1TYM” for the four members Teddy, Jinhwan, Baekyoung, and Danny. They debuted in November as 1TYM in 1998 with the album, One Time for Your Mind. It was one of the best-selling albums of the year and won several major awards.

== Hiatus ==
1TYM went on hiatus in 2006 due to Oh's mandatory military service. Although they never officially disbanded they have not been active as a group since then. Their last performance was in 2008, when they were guests for BIGBANG's Japan Concert "Stand Up".

Oh and Song both left the entertainment industry and have since married and started their own families. Song most recently made an appearance on Radio Star alongside fellow first-generation K-pop idol singers Joon Park and Kim Tae-woo of g.o.d and Jun Jin of Shinhwa. He stated that he and Oh were business partners and run a restaurant together.

== Members ==
- Teddy – rap, leader
- Oh Jin-hwan – rap
- Song Baek-kyoung – rap
- Danny – vocals

== Discography ==
=== Studio albums ===
Title	Album details	Peak chart positions	Sales
Title	Album details	KOR	Sales
One Time For Your Mind	Released: November 15, 1998; Label: YG Entertainment; Formats: CD, cassette; Track listing: 1. 1TYM; 2. 널 일으켜 (Get Up); 3. 탈출 (Escape); 4. Good Love; 5. Falling In Love; 6. 뭘 위한 세상인가 (What Is This World For); 7. My Life; 8. Heaven; 9. 나를 기다려 (Wait for Me)	6	KOR: 232,418+
2nd Round	Released: April 1, 2000; Label: YG Entertainment; Formats: CD, cassette; Track listing: 1. 악 (Ack); 2. 흑과백 (Black and White); 3. Ready Or Not Yo!; 4. 쾌지나 칭칭 (It Passes); 5. 구제불능 (Impossible Relief); 6. One Love; 7. 21세가기란게 뭐야 (What Does 21st Century Mean); 8. 1TYMillenium; 9. 향해가 (Headed That Way); 10. 너와나 우리 영원히 또 하나 (You and Me, Us Forever As One!)	6	KOR: 275,618+
Third Time Fo Yo' Mind	Released: December 13, 2001; Label: YG Entertainment; Formats: CD, cassette; Track listing: 1. Nasty; 2. Hello; 3. 우와 (Wow); 4. Make it Last; 5. 어젯밤 이야기 (Last Night Story); 6. Hip Hop Kids; 7. 어머니 (Mother); 8. 버스 (Bus); 9. Sucka Busta	12	KOR: 128,924+
Once N 4 All	Released: November 26, 2003; Label: YG Entertainment; Formats: CD, cassette; Track listing: 1. Freeflo; 2. Uh-oh; 3. 떠나자 (Set It Off); 4. Hot 뜨거; 5. Without You; 6. Cry; 7. Danny's Interlude; 8. Everyday and Night; 9. Kiss Me; 10. It's Over; 11. Teddy's Interlude; 12. Ok (feat. Perry & Lexy); 13. Put'Em Up	4	KOR: 110,348+
One Way	Released: November 1, 2005; Label: YG Entertainment; Formats: CD, cassette; Track listing: 1. One Way (Intro); 2. 니가 날 알어 (Do You Know Me?); 3. 어쩔겁니까 (What You Gunna Do?); 4. 몇 번이나 (How Many Times?); 5. The Instruction (Interlude); 6. 위험해 (Danger); 7. Summer Night (feat. Big Mama); 8. Can't Let U Go; 9. Take It Slow; 10. Supa Funk; 11. Get Them Hands Up; 12. How It Go; 13. Hippy To Da Happa (Outro); 14. 어쩔겁니까 (What You Gunna Do?) (YG Remix); 15. 니가 날 알어 (Do You Know Me?) (Instrumental)	4	KOR: 34,119+

=== Music videos ===
Music Video	Year	Length
"1TYM"	1998	3:51
"Good Love"	1998	3:48
"One Love"	2000	4:23
"Nasty"	2001	4:45
"Mother"	2001	5:34
"Make It Last"	2001	4:41
"Hot"	2003	4:10
"Without You"	2003	4:41
"Cry"	2003	4:03
"Do You Know Me?"	2005	3:25
"How Many Times"	2005	4:43

== Awards ==
=== KMTV Music Awards ===
Year	Award	Nominated work	Result
1998	Best Hip Hop Artist	1TYM	Won
2002	Best Hip Hop Artist	1TYM	Won

=== Golden Disk Awards ===
Year	Award	Nominated work	Result
1998	Rookie of the Year	1TYM	Won

=== SBS Music Awards ===
Year	Award	Nominated work	Result
1998	Rookie of the Year	1TYM	Won
2000	Best Hip Hop Artist	1TYM	Won
2002	Best Hip Hop Artist	1TYM	Won
