= Taebin =

American singer (born 1980)

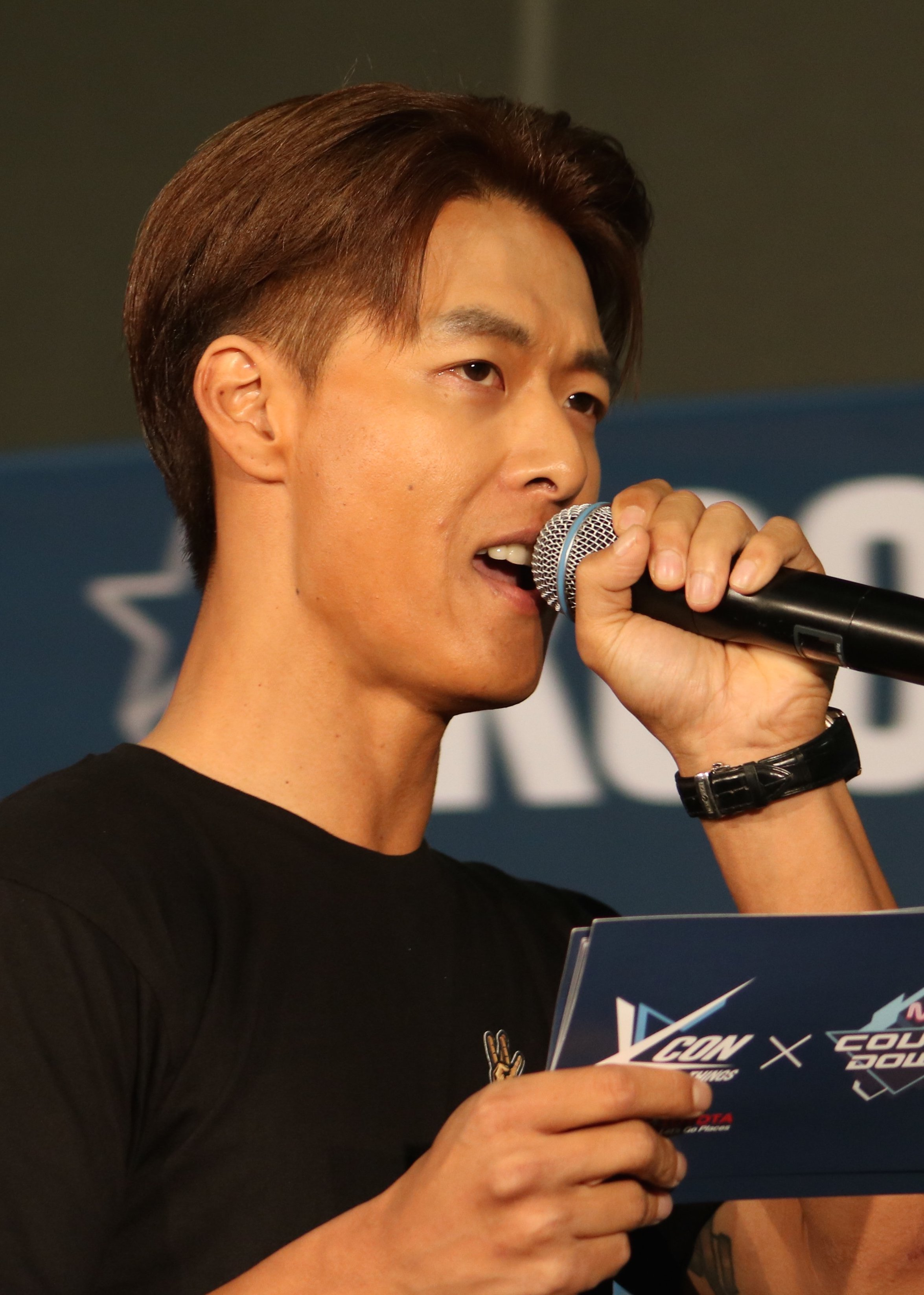
- Taebin in August 2016

Background information
- Born: Danny Im; May 6, 1980 (age 46); Los Angeles, California, U.S.
- Origin: Diamond Bar, California, U.S.
- Genres: Hip hop
- Occupations: Singer, television host
- Years active: 1998-present
- Label: YG Entertainment

Danny Im (born May 6, 1980), known professionally as Taebin (Korean: 태빈), is an American singer and television host. He debuted as a member of the hip hop group 1TYM in 1998, and he released his first solo album in 2004. Im began hosting the Mnet America talk show Danny From L.A. in 2012.

== Early life ==
Danny Im grew up in Diamond Bar, California. He attended Diamond Bar High School with future fellow 1TYM member Teddy Park, and graduated in 1998.

== Career ==
Im debuted as a singer in 1998 as a member of Korean hip hop group 1TYM. Im promoted under the stage name Taebin, which his grandfather chose when Im asked him for a Korean name.

While he was the leading vocalist for 1TYM, he also rapped like the rest of the members of the group in various songs such as 'What You Gonna Do,' and 'One Time For Your Mind' . After the release of 1TYM's fourth album Once N 4 All in 2003, Im returned to his fans with the release of his solo album "TAEBIN of 1TYM", which showcased the full range of his sound potential rather than hip-hop sounds to which his fans were accustomed. The main track of this album "The Reason Why I Close My Eyes" is a mid-tempo song featuring mellow vocals and string arrangements. His album also features songs composed by Kim Do Hoon with lyrics by Wheesung.

The second track, "The Reason Why I Close my Eyes", is the only song on the album with a music video made for it and stars Koo Hye Sun. The twelfth track, "TaBu (featuring Park Teddy)" was banned in Korea due to the song 'being thick with sexual intentions.' A music video was supposed to be filmed for the song, but as it was banned, the video was never made. Taebin expressed his disappointment on this ban by stating that "TaBu" was one of his favorite tracks on the album, and that he only wanted to show an amazing love through his voice.

In 2012, he began his own TV show, "Danny from LA", which premiered on Mnet America in September. The show talks about the latest trends in Kpop, as well as his time in 1TYM.

== Personal life ==
On December 1, 2012, Danny officially revealed a photo of himself and his son through his personal Twitter account @Dannyim. The news of Danny having a son first broke out through one of Seungri's Diary entries. Danny then officially confirmed his marriage and child at Danny From LA's episode with Big Bang. After mistaken reports of the birth of a son, Danny announced the birth of a daughter on a Danny From LA special for CN Blue Blue Moon World Tour concert, which aired on February 20, 2014.

== Discography ==
Studio albums

Title	Album details	Peak chart positions	Sales
Title	Album details	KOR	Sales
Taebin of 1TYM	Released: June 10, 2004; Label: YG Entertainment, Fat Dog; Format: CD, cassette	10	KOR: 31,370
