= Jinusean =

South Korean hip hop duo

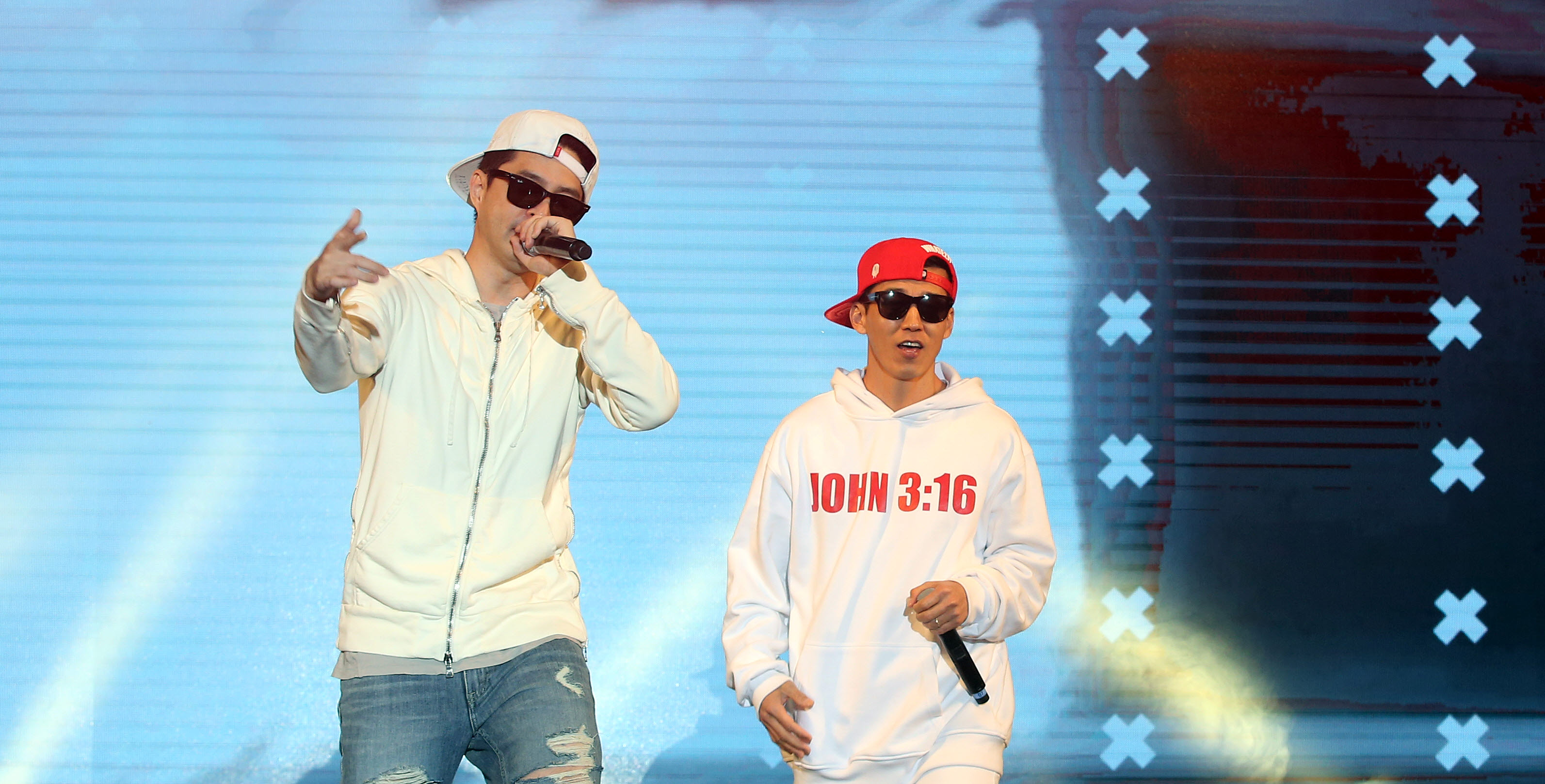
- Jinusean in 2016

Background information
- Origin: South Korea
- Genres: K-pop; Korean hip hop
- Years active: 1997–2004; 2015–2020
- Label: YG Entertainment
- Past members: Jinu; Sean
- Website: Official website

Korean name
- Hangul: 지누션
- RR: Jinusyeon
- MR: Chinusyŏn

Jinusean (stylized in all caps; Korean: 지누션) was a South Korean hip hop duo signed to YG Entertainment. The duo, which is made up of Jinu and Sean, debuted in 1997 and rose to fame with the single, "Tell Me." They are considered pioneers of Korean hip hop.

== History ==
Prior to forming Jinusean, Sean worked as a back-up dancer for legendary K-pop group Seo Taiji and Boys in the early 1990s, and Jinu debuted as a solo artist with the song, "I Was The Captain" in 1994. The two debuted as Jinusean with the single, "Gasoline," in 1997 under the guidance of YG Entertainment CEO and former Seo Taiji and Boys member Yang Hyun-suk and former Deux member Lee Hyun Do. Their second single, "Tell Me" (featuring singer Uhm Jung-hwa), was the duo's first hit and propelled them to stardom. Notably, Jinusean became the first hip hop artist to sell over 700,000 copies in South Korea.

Between 2004 and 2014, the duo went on an extended hiatus but remained at YG Entertainment working in various behind-the-scenes roles. They also individually made guest appearances at several YG Family concerts. In 2014 they made an appearance in the Infinite Challenge special "Saturday, Saturday is for Singers" (ToToGa), which features popular singers and groups from the 1990s, and performed as a duo on television for the first time in a decade. In 2015 they released their comeback single "Tell Me One More Time", their first release since 2004. They also appeared in the fourth season of the rap competition Show Me the Money as judges.

== Members ==
- Jinu (지누)
- Sean (션)

== Discography ==
=== Studio albums ===
Title	Album details	Peak chart positions	Sales
Title	Album details	KOR	Sales
Jinusean	Released: March 1, 1997; Label: YG Entertainment; Formats: CD, cassette; Track listing: 1. Jinusean Bomb (Feat. Perry, Legacy); 2. Gasoline; 3. 내가; 4. 말해줘 (Feat. Uhm Jung-hwa); 5. Celebrate; 6. Young Nation (Feat. D.O, Yang Hyun-suk); 7. 미행; 8. 서로; 9. Celebrate (English Ver.) (Feat. Lee Sae-yeong, Perry); 10. Gasoline (D.O Edit Ver.) (Feat. Yang Hyun-suk)	No data	No data
The Real	Released: January 5, 1998; Label: YG Entertainment; Formats: CD, cassette; Track listing: 1. Jinusean Bomb (remix) (Feat. Perry); 2. 이제 더 이상 (MF Family Ver.) (Feat. Yang Hyun-suk FM New Group); 3. Gasoline (English Ver.); 4. Celebrate (remix) (Feat. Lee Sae-yeong, Perry); 5. Throw Them Hands Up (Feat. Perry, FM New Group); 6. Gasoline (remix); 7. Like This, Like That (Feat. Jo Wonsun); 8. What U Wanna Do (English Ver.) (Feat. Perry, FM New Group); 9. Jinusean Bomb (Original Ver.) (Feat. Perry); 10. Celebrate (Original Ver.)	No data	No data
Taekwon V	Released: March 9, 1999; Label: YG Entertainment; Formats: CD, cassette; Track listing: 1. Intro; 2. Taekwon V 3. How Deep Is Your Love; 4. Baby Come Back; 5. Return Of The Bomb; 6. 자유; 7. 자나깨나; 8. Freestyle; 9. 너를 기억해	4	KOR: 254,031+
The Reign	Released: February 7, 2001; Label: YG Entertainment; Formats: CD, cassette; Track listing: 1. Holdin’ Down (Feat. Mobb Deep, Perry); 2. A-Yo!; 3. Real Wunz (Feat. Cypress Hill); 4. 빙빙빙; 5. Hip Hop Seoul-자(者) (Feat. Chino XL, Masta Wu, Teddy); 6. Ooh Boy (Feat. J); 7. 2 Run Hip Hop; 8. 힙合 (Feat. Masta Wu, Lexy); 9. Follow Me (Feat. M-Flo); 10. Js Anthem; 11. Outro (Feat. 3534, Lexy, Vanessa); 12. Ooh Boy (The Black Crow Remix) (Feat. Perry, Lexy, Yoon Hee-joong	4	KOR: 218,135+
Let's Play (노.라.보.세.)	Released: November 12, 2004; Label: YG Entertainment; Formats: CD, cassette; Track listing: 1. What’s Up (Intro) (Feat. Perry, Kim Ji-eun); 2. Phone Number (전화번호); 3. 요술방망이; 4. 신나는 힙합; 5. Tonight (Feat. Kim Ji-eun); 6. 미스터 지누션 (Feat. Wheesung, Masta Wu); 7. Good Time (Feat. Wheesung); 8. 보이네 (Feat. Gummy); 9. 2 All My People (Feat. Snoop Dogg, Warren G, Perry); 10. Welcome (Feat. Lexy); 11. Micro Phone (Feat. Teddy and Danny of 1TYM); 12. What’s Up (Outro) (Feat. Perry); 13. 열정 리믹스 (Remix) (Feat. Seven)	12	KOR: 24,391+

=== Singles ===
Name of the single, year released, selected chart position, sales figure, and name of the album
Title	Year	Peak positions	Sales	Album
Title	Year	KOR	Sales	Album
Tell Me One More Time (한번 더 말해줘) (feat. Jang Hanna)	2015	5	KOR: 675,611	Non-album single

== Videography ==
=== Music videos ===
List of music videos, showing year released and name of the directors
Year	Title	Director(s)	Ref.
1997	"Gasoline"	Unknown	
1998	"What U Wanna Do"	Unknown	
1999	"Taekwon V"	Unknown	
1999	"How Deep is Your Love"	Unknown	
2001	"A-Yo!"	Unknown	
2004	"Phone Number" (전화번호)	Unknown	
2015	"Tell Me One More Time" (한번 더 말해줘)	Unknown	
2015	"Oppa's Car" (오빠차) (featuring Incredivle, Tablo)	Unknown	

== Filmography ==
=== Television shows ===
Year	Title		Network	Role	Notes	Ref.
Year	English	Korean	Network	Role	Notes	Ref.
2015	Show Me the Money 4	쇼미더머니 4	Mnet	Producer	with Tablo	

== Concerts ==
Date	Title	City	Country	Venue	Attendance	Ref.
December 13, 2015	Jinusean Bomb	Seoul	South Korea	Olympic Hall	± 3.500	

== Awards and nominations ==
Name of the award ceremony, year presented, category, nominee of the award, and the result of the nomination
Award ceremony	Year	Category	Nominee / work	Result	Ref.
Golden Disc Awards	1997	Rookie Artist Award	Jinusean	Won	
Seoul Music Awards	1997	Main Prize (Bonsang)	Jinusean	Won	
Mnet Asian Music Awards	2001	Best Hip-hop Performance	"A-yo"	Nominated	
Mnet Asian Music Awards	2001	Best Male Group	"A-yo"	Nominated	
Mnet Asian Music Awards	2005	Best Hip-hop Performance	"Phone Number"	Nominated	
