= Mapo =

Mapo may refer to:

- Mapo District (마포구 / 麻浦區), a district of Seoul, South Korea
- Mapo Station (마포역 / 麻浦驛), on the Seoul Metropolitan Subway, South Korea
- MiG MAPO, a major Russian state-owned military aircraft manufacturer
- Mapo doufu (麻婆豆腐), or tofu, a popular Chinese dish from Sichuan province
- the MAPO (MAry POppins), train safety system used on the Walt Disney World Monorail System
- Mapo (magazine), magazine published in Albania
- Mapo, Beijing (马坡地区), area of Shunyi District
