= YG Entertainment =

South Korean entertainment company

YG Entertainment Inc.
- Logo used since March 2013
- Native name: YG 엔터테인먼트
- Type: Public
- Traded as: KRX: 122870
- Industry: Entertainment; retail
- Founded: February 24, 1996; 30 years ago
- Founder: Yang Hyun-suk
- Headquarters: 7, Huiujeong-ro 1-gil, Mapo-gu, Seoul, South Korea
- Area served: Worldwide
- Key people: Kim Dong-hyun (Chairman); Yang Min-suk (CEO and President); Hwang Bo-kyung (CAO and VP); Lee Kyung-jun (COO and VP)
- Services: Music production, publishing, new artist development, and artist management
- Revenue: ▲ ₩545.4 billion (US$406.93 million) (2025)
- Net income: ▲ ₩53.8 billion (US$40.14 million) (2025)
- Total assets: ▲ ₩838.78 billion (US$625.83 million) (2025)
- Total equity: ▲ ₩650.85 billion (US$485.61 million) (2025)
- Owner: Yang Hyun-suk (19.33%); Naver Corporation (8.89%); Others (75.78%)
- Number of employees: 438 (2025)
- Subsidiaries: YG Plus
- Website: ygfamily.com

YG Entertainment Inc. (Korean: YG 엔터테인먼트) is a South Korean multinational entertainment agency established on 24 February 1996 by Yang Hyun-suk. The company operates as a record label, talent agency, music production company, event management and concert production company, and music publishing house. In addition, the company operates a number of subsidiary ventures under a separate public traded company, YG Plus, which includes a clothing line, a golf management agency, and a cosmetics brand. However, despite various business expansions, most of the ventures were discontinued due to a lack of profitability.

Current artists include Eun Ji-won, BigBang, 2NE1, Winner, Blackpink, Treasure, and Babymonster.

Former artists include Swi.T, Moogadang, Wheesung, 1TYM, Big Mama, Gummy, Seven, Nam Tae-hyun, Psy, Epik High, One, Lee Hi, Jinusean, Bang Yedam, Mashiho, iKon, Jisoo, Jennie, Rosé, Lisa, Sechs Kies, and AKMU.

== History ==
=== 1990–2005: Pop culture roots, early success and first generation K-pop ===
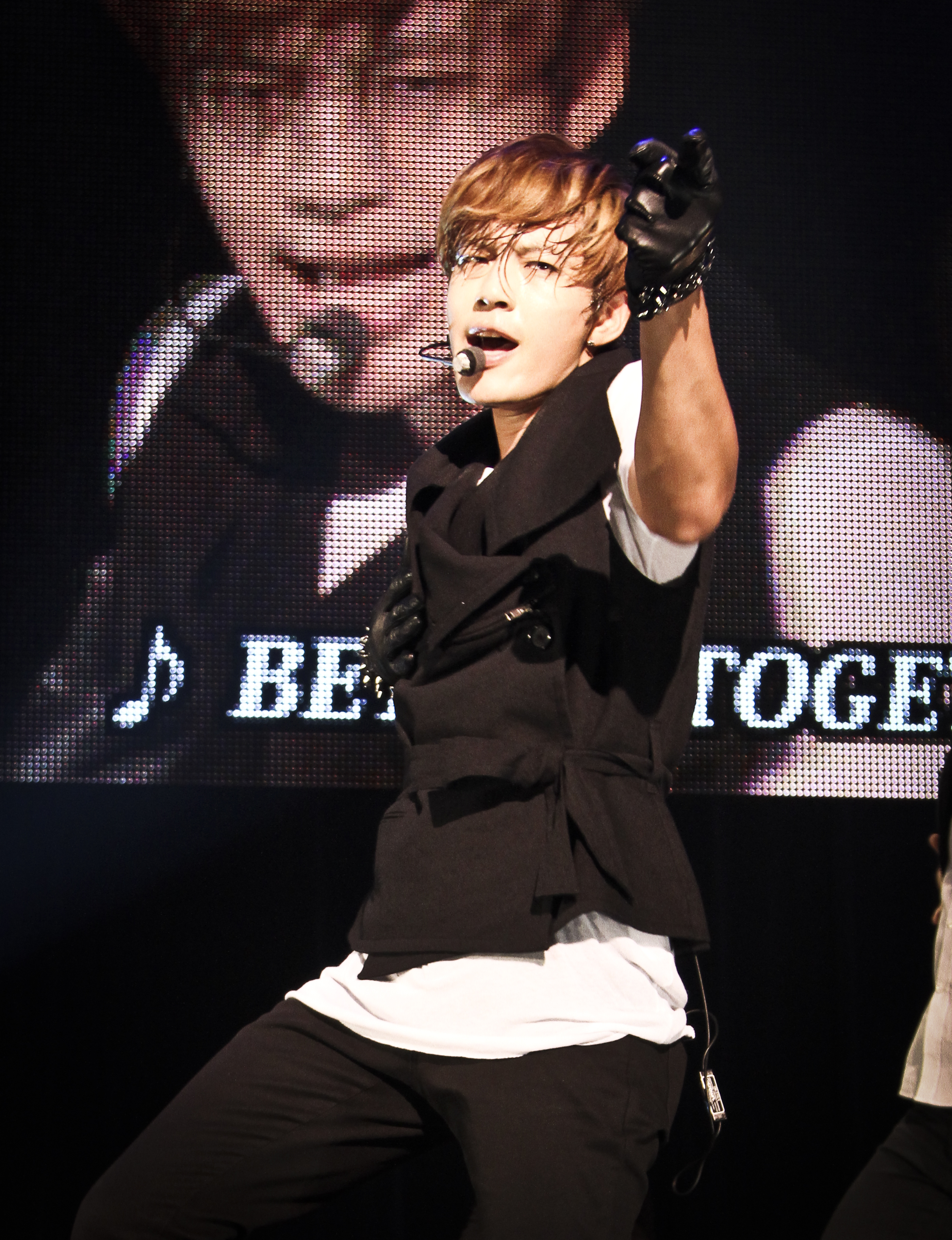
Se7en debuted under YG Entertainment in 2003

In March 1996, Yang Hyun-suk, a former member of the first-generation K-pop group Seo Taiji and Boys, founded YG Entertainment under the name Hyun Planning (Korean: 현기획). The company's first act was the hip-hop trio Keep Six. The group did not attract much popularity, and their failure sent Yang into debts of 400 million won. After Keep Six, the company changed its named to MF Planning, and launched the groups Jinusean and 1TYM. Yang credits the success of both acts for bringing YG and the hip hop genre into mainstream Korean music. In 1998, YG changed its name once again to Yang Goon Planning, after Yang Hyun-suk's nickname Yang Goon (양군).

In 1999, YG's artists released a collaborative album under the name YG Family. The label followed with releases from artists such as Perry, Masta Wu, Swi.T, Big Mama, Lexy, Gummy and Wheesung. It also established the "YG Underground" label, which housed 45RPM and Stony Skunk. In 2001, YG changed to its current name, YG Entertainment, which was named from the initials of Yang Goon, and a second YG Family album was released. Among others, the album featured a 13-year-old G-Dragon, who was then a trainee.

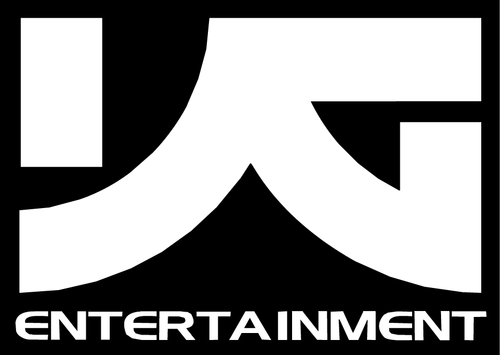
Logo used from 2004 to 2013

The agency found success in both Korea and Japan with its first "idol" singer Seven in 2003, who became the company's first artist to attempt to cross over into the US music scene, though his US debut failed to gain momentum.

=== 2006–2011: Mainstream breakthrough ===
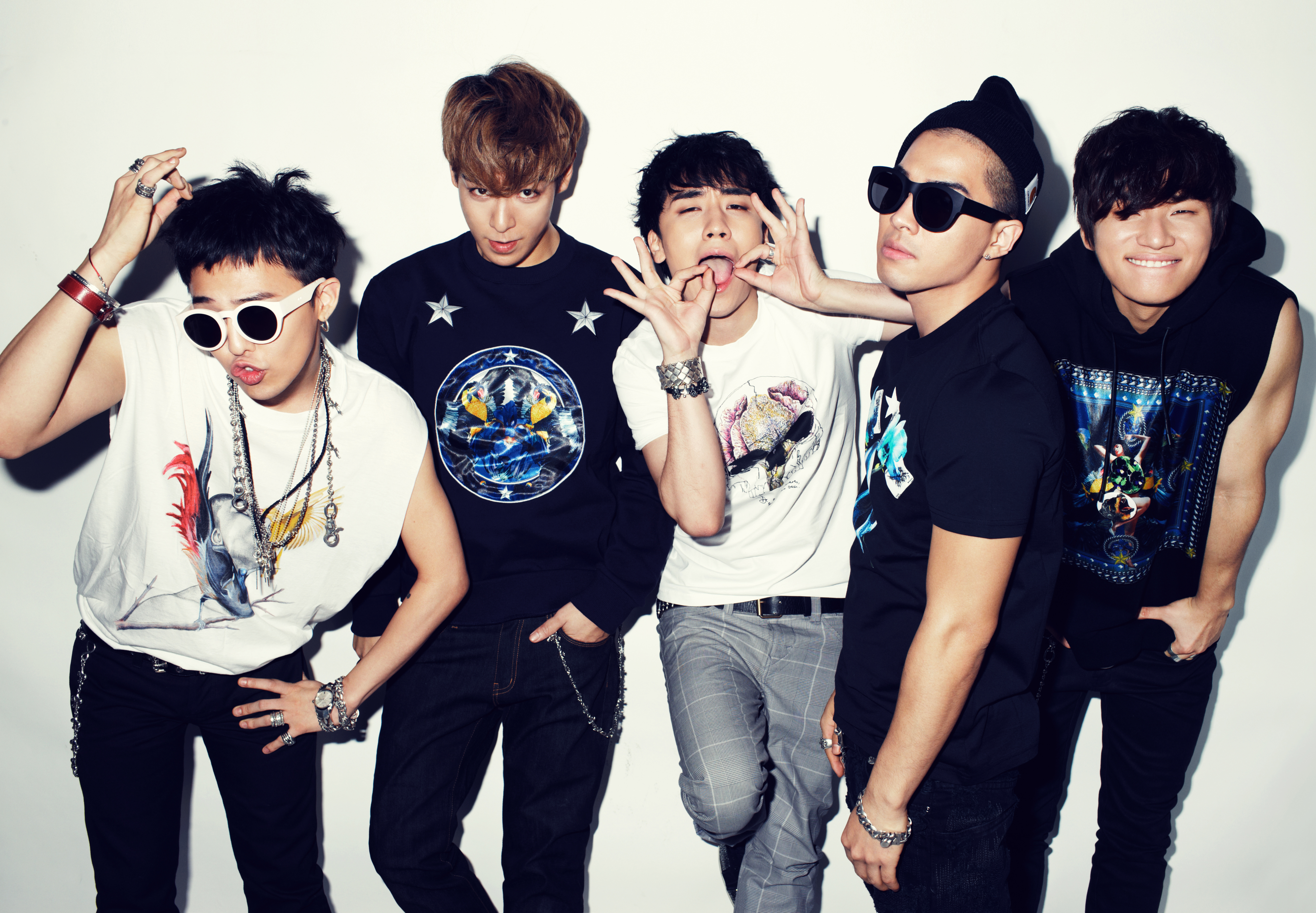
Big Bang debuted in 2006 and was responsible for more than half of YG's albums sold in Korea from 2014 to 2017.

Following Se7en's success, YG formed its first idol group Big Bang in 2006. Despite an initial lukewarm reception, the group's breakthrough the following year and their consistent popularity have made them one of the biggest and most bankable boy bands in the world. This was followed by YG's first successful girl group 2NE1 in 2009, who, prior to their split in 2016, were considered one of the most successful and popular girl groups in South Korea. Similarly to Seven, both groups conducted successful careers in Japan.

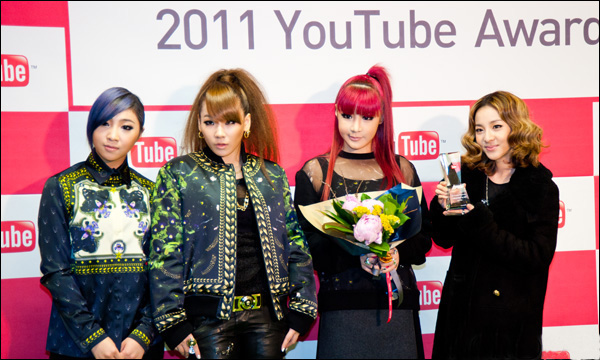
2NE1 debuted in 2009 as the first major girl group under YG and became the first group to achieve nine number-one songs on the Gaon Digital Chart.

In 2010, YG made a highly publicized move into a new building, while the old headquarters became a training facility. In the same year, the company unsuccessfully applied for listing on the stock exchange; it was suspected that this was because the company had too few active music groups and an unstable cash flow, despite an increase in earnings in 2009. Later that year, the label signed established artist Psy.

=== 2012–2016: International recognition and business expansion ===
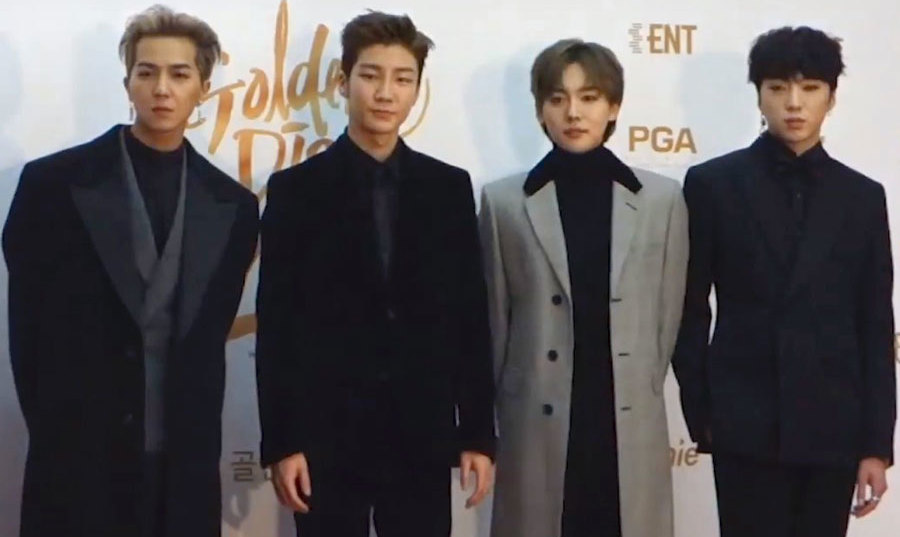
Winner successfully debuted in 2014 and became the fastest K-Pop group to win #1 at music shows. They grabbed their first music show win just six days into their debut.

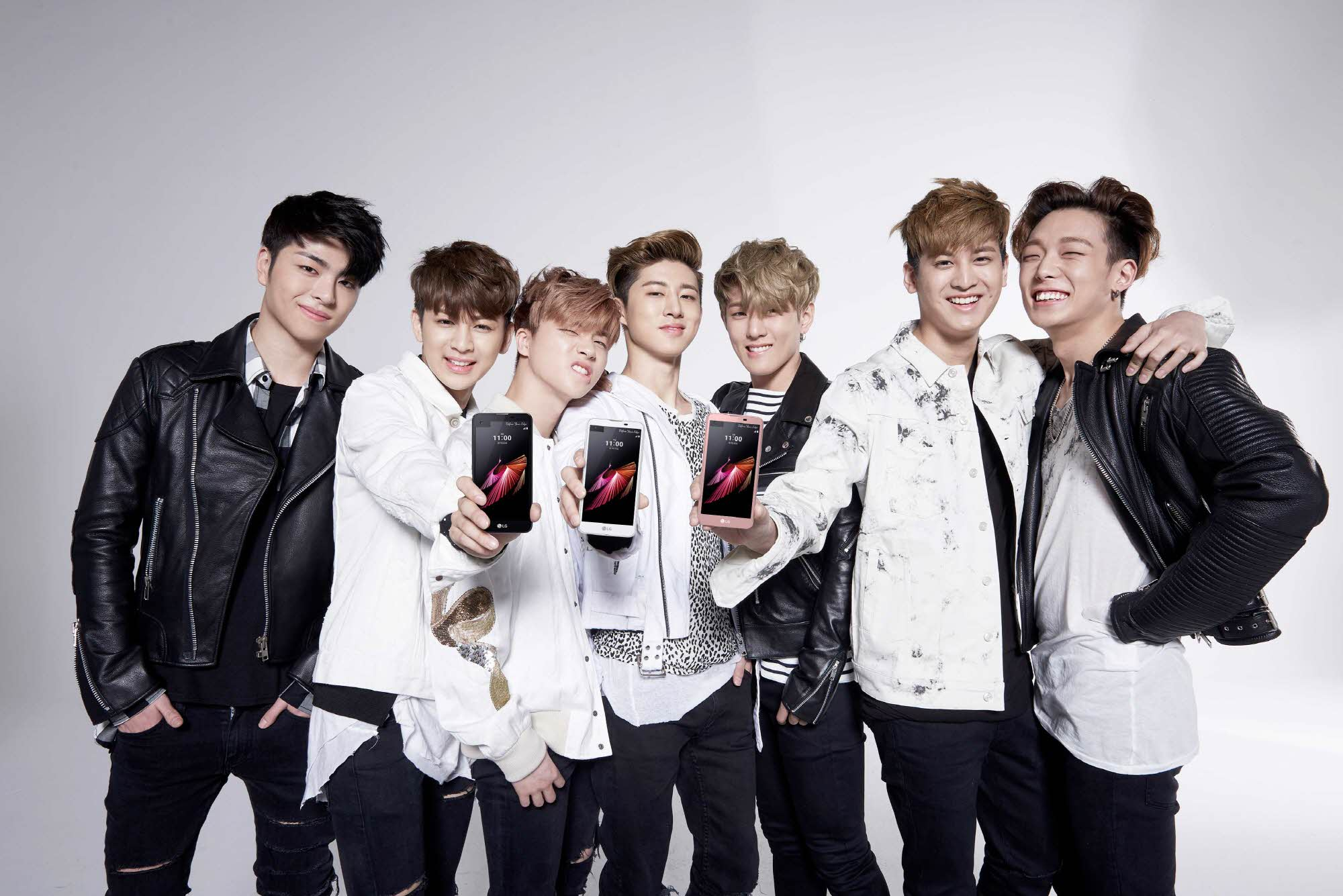
iKon debuted in 2015. Their 2018 single, "Love Scenario", broke several records at the time; including the longest run as the top-charting song, the most hours of 'perfect all-kills,' and the first song to be certified Platinum by the KCMA.

2012 brought YG international recognition when Psy's "Gangnam Style" gained worldwide popularity as a viral video. On August 21, it charted at number one on the iTunes Music Video Charts. This feat was a first for a South Korean artist. By November 24, "Gangnam Style" had become the most viewed video in YouTube history, and the first video to surpass a billion views. The song was credited as the main reason for YG's share prices increasing by more than 60 per cent, with the record label subsequently filing its first annual report in 2012 with profits of over 50% after going public on the KOSDAQ the year before.

That same year, the label signed rapper and producer Tablo, leader of the hip hop group Epik High, relaunching his career after a musical hiatus following his Stanford controversy. Tablo's band Epik High later transitioned into the record label following his success.

Yang's increased involvement on competitive reality television series led to several record deals with contestants, starting with K-pop Star's first season runner-up Lee Hi. Other participants on the show were signed as potential members of the label's future boy groups. On the second season of the show, both the winners, sibling duo Akdong Musician as well as runner-up Bang Ye-dam, signed under the agency. The reality program Win: Who is Next was later launched by YG, in which two teams of male trainees competed against each other for the chance to sign a contract with the label to debut as the company's next boy band. The conclusion of the reality series saw the formation of Winner.

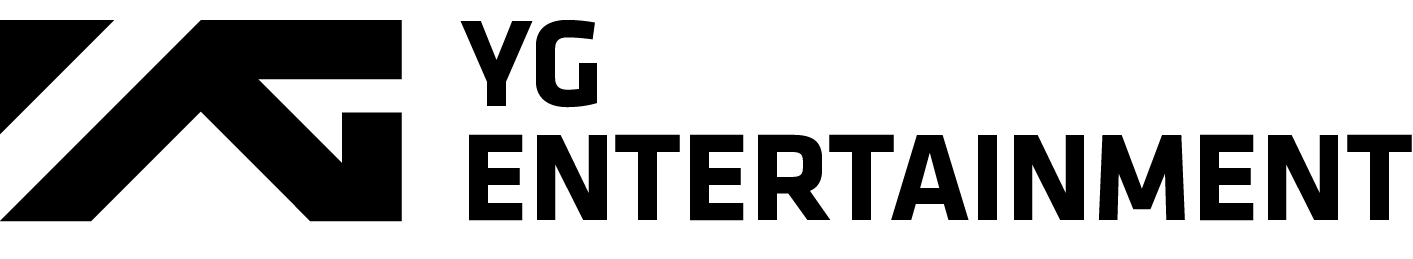
Alternative logo since 2013

In 2014, YG acquired T Entertainment's staff and actors including Cha Seung-won, Im Ye-jin, and Jang Hyun-sung. Through the acquisition of modelling agency KPlus, it expanded its acting division through the acting debuts of models Lee Sung-kyung and Nam Joo-hyuk. YG also signed a contract with actress Choi Ji-woo. French luxury giant LVMH's private equity arm, L Capital Asia, later announced that it would be investing up to US$80 million in YG. Headquartered in Singapore, L Capital Asia would become the second-largest investor in YG with an 11.5% stake, second only to Yang Hyun-suk's 28%. In 2014 YG expanded into the beauty industry with the creation of its cosmetics brand Moonshot.

In 2015, YG invested nearly US$100 million in a new Gyeonggi Province-based industrial complex which was slated to be complete by December 2018. Real estate in Seoul worth ₩16 billion (US$14 million) was also purchased for the purpose of expanding their headquarters. In that year, the company also saw the creation of two sub-labels, the first led by Tablo and the second headed by YG producers Teddy Park of 1TYM and Kush of Stony Skunk. The members of the losing team from the reality series WIN: Who is Next regrouped and debuted as iKon, along with a new member.

When Gong Minji, the youngest member of 2NE1 announced that she had left the group in April 2016, YG Entertainment stated that the group would continue as a trio. In November 2016, YG announced that CL and Dara had renewed their contracts as solo artists, indicating Park Bom's departure from the agency and the disbandment of 2NE1. On January 21, 2017, 2NE1 appeared as a trio and released "Goodbye" as a farewell song that CL wrote when she heard the news of Minji's departure.

Sixteen years after the group's disbandment, first-generation K-pop boy band Sechs Kies signed a contract with YG in May 2016 to relaunch their career. In the same month, Chinese technology enterprises Tencent and Weiying Technology announced an investment of US$85 million in YG. Weiying took an 8.2% stake in the company and Tencent a 4.5% stake. YG later added Lee Jong-suk, Kang Dong-won, and Kim Hee-jung to their list of actors. YG debuted their second girl group Blackpink in 2016, their first since 2NE1, followed by the solo rapper One the following year.

=== 2017–2019: Scandals, controversies, and artists' departure ===
At the end of 2017, YG with JTBC launched a talent survival show entitled Mix Nine, a contest between trainees from different agencies. Although the winning team was scheduled to debut as idols, YG revealed that the debut for the male winning group had been cancelled. The failure of the show led to incurred losses of ₩7 billion won in the first quarter and ₩4 billion won in the last three months of 2017, causing JYP Entertainment to surpass YG as the second-highest valued K-pop company.

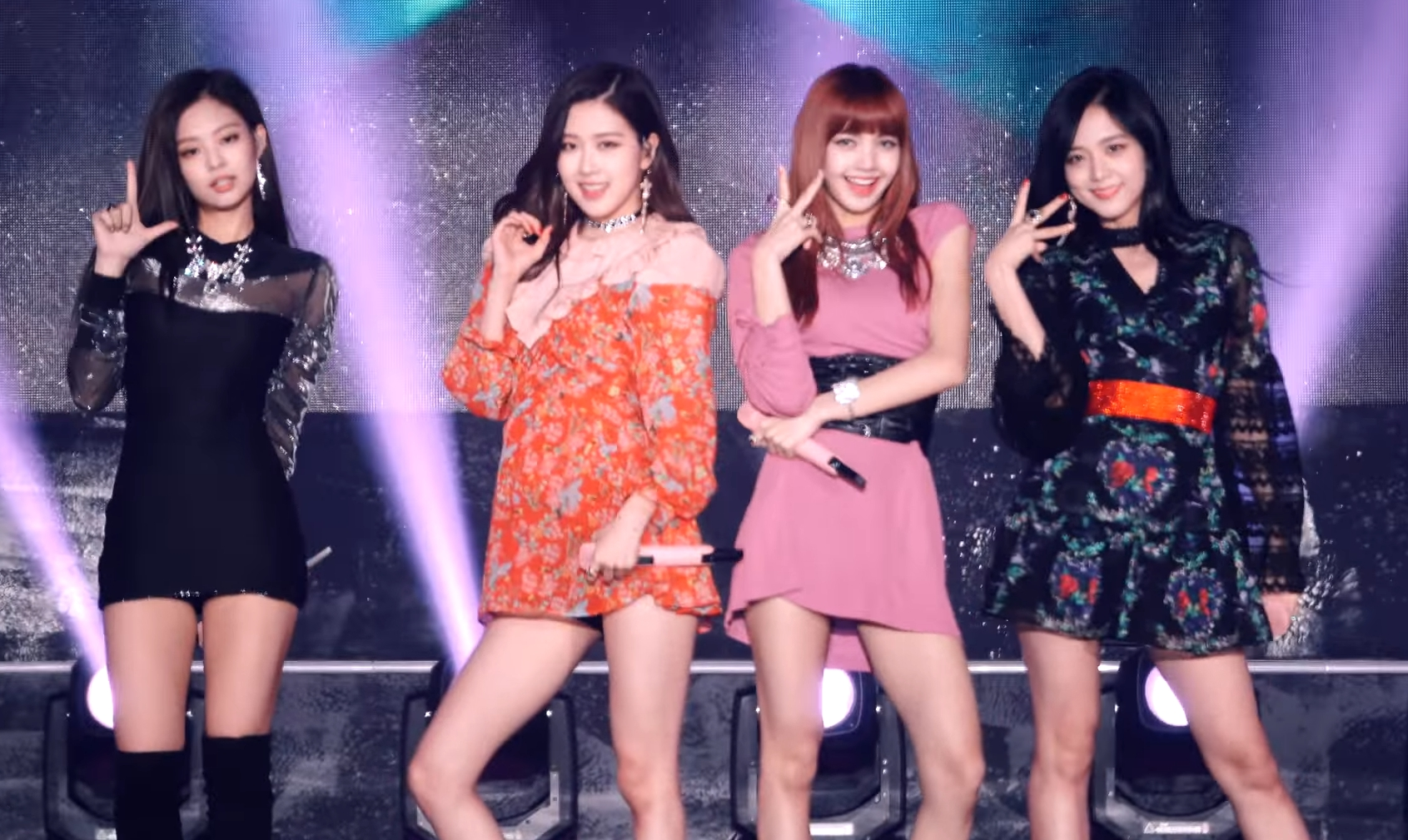
Blackpink debuted in 2016 and became the first female K-pop group to have four number-one singles on Billboard's World Digital Song Sales chart.

In May 2018, Psy left the company after eight years. Epik High member Tablo announced that his hip-hop group had terminated its contract with YG after six years of working together in October 2018. At the same time, HIGHGRND and it artist have been released from YG and Epik High. In November 2018, YG announced YG Treasure Box, a talent survival show to determine the line-up for their next boy group scheduled to debut in 2019. YG later announced that this event would produce two groups, Treasure and Magnum, both of whom would be active as Treasure 13.

In 2019, the Burning Sun scandal involving Big Bang member Seungri heated up, which resulted in Seungri's decision to retire from the entertainment industry on March 11, 2019. Seungri was then sentenced to 3 years in prison in August 2021, which was reduced to 18 months in January 2022. Comedian Yoo Byung-jae decided to leave YG before his contract ended, after this scandal further dragged the name of the agency. In early June 2019, B.I, the leader of iKon, was reported to have attempted to purchase LSD and marijuana illegally in 2016; he announced his apology to fans and declared his departure from iKon and YG Entertainment. Yang was also reported to have colluded with the police to cover up the B.I case.

Yang is also accused of money laundering, illegal gambling, and preparing sexual services for potential investors. Due to this series of scandals and controversies, Yang Hyun Suk resigned from all his positions at the agency. Likewise, his younger brother, Yang Min Suk, relinquished his position as CEO of YG Entertainment as a form of accountability. This resignation was officially announced on June 14, 2019. CFO Hwang Bo-kyung was appointed as the new CEO of YG on June 20, 2019.

In July 2019, rapper One announced that he had parted ways with YG and founded his own sole agency. Following 2NE1's disbandment in 2016, CL announced that she would not be renewing her contract with YG Entertainment in November 2019. At the end of December 2019, solo singer Lee Hi announced that YG was no longer her agency, not long after that she released a new album with AOMG.

=== 2020–present: Recent developments ===
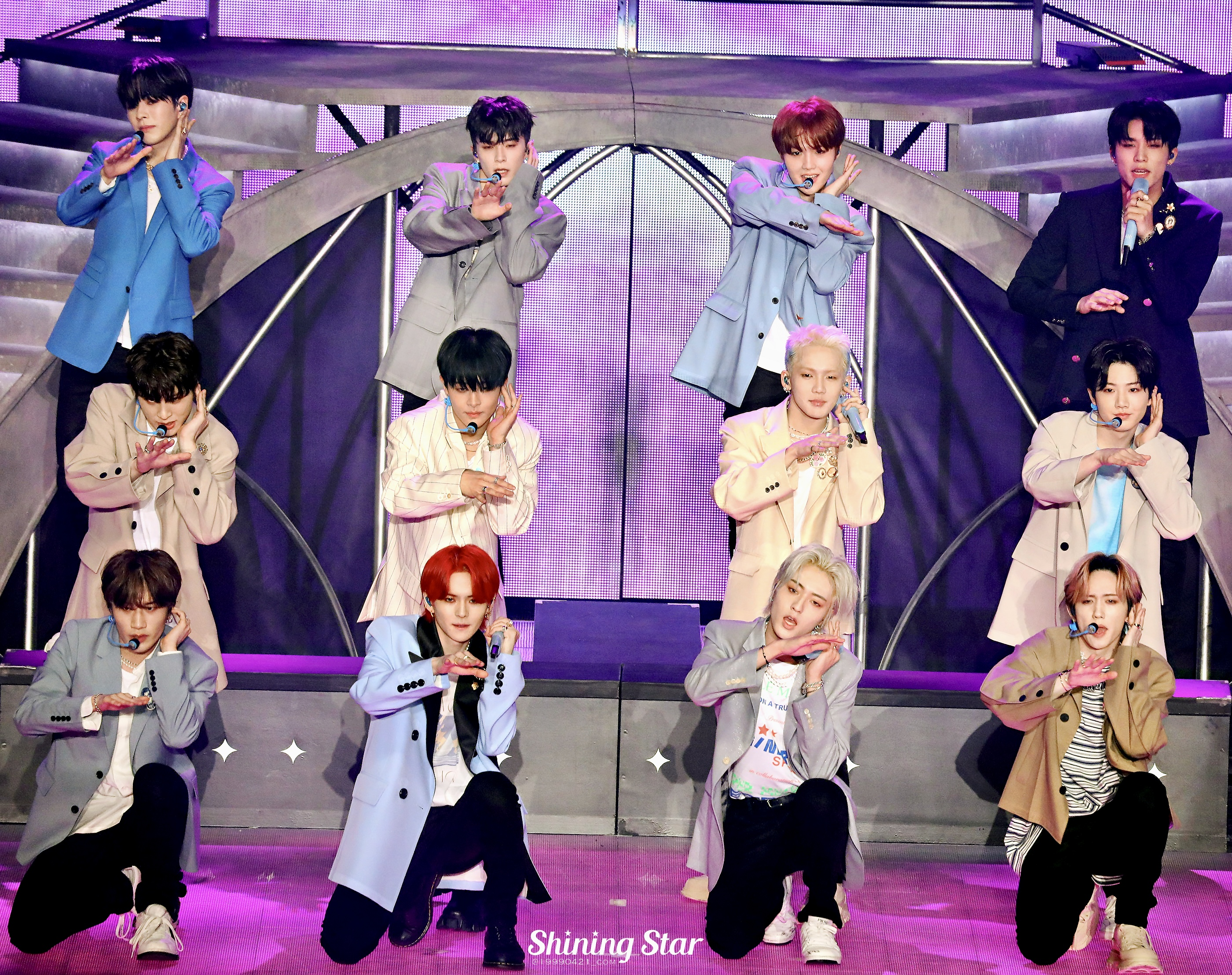
Treasure in April 2022

In 2020, YG announced plans for Treasure's debut which had been delayed since 2019, Blackpink's first full album and Big Bang's comeback which was eventually delayed until 2022. They were expected to appear at the 2020 Coachella festival, until it was cancelled due to the COVID-19 pandemic. During the first half of 2020, YG's financial growth slowly rebounded after the slump. This was assisted by the direction of its business strategy which was primarily international fan oriented. Domestic public sentiment had not yet recovered, but overseas demand remained strong, with approximately 70% of YG Entertainment’s digital music sales in 1Q20 coming from international markets. Most of YG’s global music demand at the time was driven by Blackpink in the US and growing brand recognition of G-Dragon in China.

During the second half of 2020, YG displayed a positive financial trend due to Treasure's debut album series, Blackpink's full album, Winner's Mino, Yoon's solo activities and AKMU's Suhyun's solo activities. Although not in line with the expected target, this value is thought to be due to COVID-19, which caused some concerts to be cancelled. The construction of the new YG Entertainment building was declared complete in September 2020, this building was chosen as the most luxurious and most expensive entertainment agency building in South Korea.

In January 2021, it was reported that Big Hit Entertainment and its tech division beNX had invested a total of 70 billion won (US$63 million) in YG Entertainment's subsidiary YG Plus, or 17.9% of the company's total shares. This investment was made as a form of strategic collaboration between Big Hit Entertainment, beNX, YG Entertainment, and YG Plus, which will work together in various business areas such as platform, distribution, content, and merchandise. YG Plus is the main distributor of Hybe Corporation's products and beNX (now known as Weverse Company) provides content and a platform for YG artists.

On May 4, 2021, The Korea Exchange announced that YG was demoted in status from blue-chip companies to regular mid-sized businesses. The blue-chip status had been acquired in April 2013. The company recorded a net loss of 1.8 billion won and a return on equity of -0.5%. Its main business, music production and management, has experienced operational losses over the past two years.

In 2022, YG Entertainment announced that Treasure will be coming back with their new album, the album will be released in February 2022. After Jinwoo and Seunghoon finished their mandatory military service in January 2022, Winner gathered with a full lineup and announced that they would soon return with a new album and a full lineup after Seungyoon and Mino actively released solo albums during the group's break, YG Entertainment announced that Seungyoon will be releasing a single album in March 2022. Treasure and Winner will be holding concerts in April 2022, separately.

In February 2022, YG Entertainment announced that Big Bang would be releasing their first comeback after a hiatus which lasted for five years. In addition, they also announced that T.O.P terminated his contract with YG. On July 1, 2022, Yang Min-suk, brother of YG Entertainment founder, Yang Hyun-suk, returned to the agency after 3 years as co-CEO, joining with the current CEO, Hwang Bo-kyung.

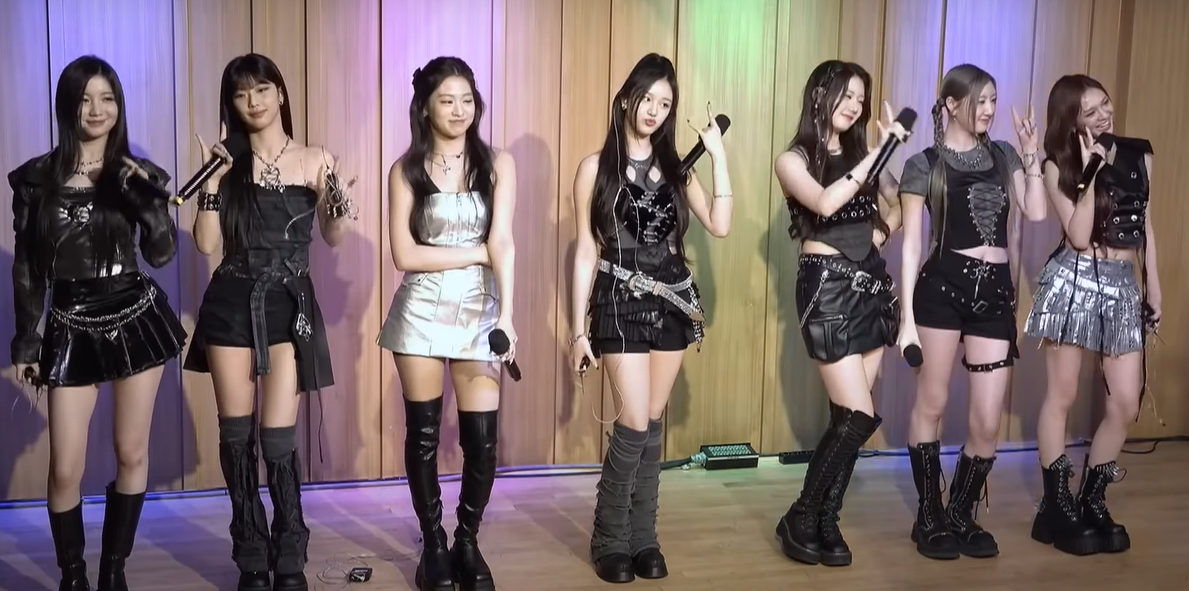
BABYMONSTER in April 2024

On December 26, 2022, it was announced that both Taeyang and Daesung would be leaving YG Entertainment after 16 years. Taeyang joined The Black Label whereas Daesung is looking for a new start under a new agency, and both reassured that they will remain BigBang members. On December 30, 2022, YG announced that all remaining members of iKon had decided not to renew their contracts after 7 years in the industry. The debut of YG's new girl group in seven years, Babymonster, was also teased, before their debut date was announced to be on November 27, 2023.

On July 22, 2024, 2NE1 re-signed with YG and would celebrate their 15th anniversary world tour starting in October 2024. In October 2024, 2NE1 officially kicked off their much-anticipated 15th anniversary reunion tour, titled "Welcome Back", starting with a concert in Seoul at the Olympic Hall.

In January 2025, YG announced that it would no longer manage actors, which is called YG Stage, in order to focus on their artists.

In May 2025, YG announced its plans for their current artists along with revealing plans to debut 2 new girl groups and 2 new boy groups in the upcoming years. In the following weeks YG released performance videos for Evelli and Chanya, two members of their upcoming four member girl group temporarily titled "YG Next Monster". In April 2026, 3rd member Kayci was revealed.

== Partnerships ==
=== Music distribution ===
YG Entertainment's records are distributed by the following:

- YG Plus (Overall since 2019), Kakao Entertainment (Specific releases only) – South Korea
- YGEX – Japan
- Tencent – China (online only)
- WMG – rest of Asia (Taiwan, Singapore, Hong Kong, Macau, India, Malaysia etc.)
- Interscope (2019 until 2023), The Orchard (Since 2024) – Europe, Oceania, North America, and Japan (for Blackpink only)
- Universal Records (until 2012), Warner Music Philippines and MCA Music Philippines – Philippines
- Columbia – (for Treasure only)

=== Genie Music ===
In March 2010, seven record labels in Korea (including the three biggest agencies: YG, SM Entertainment, JYP Entertainment, Star Empire Entertainment, Medialine, CAN Entertainment, and Music Factory) jointly established KMP Holdings, a service platform aiming to provide digital music distribution and television program productions. It was speculated that this was in challenge to the duopoly on music distribution in Korea by Mnet Media and LOEN Entertainment. In November 2012, KMP Holdings was acquired by KT Music. In January 2014, the seven agencies behind KMP Holdings formed a collective bond partnership and purchased 13.48% of KT Music's stocks, leaving parent company KT Corporation with 49.99%.

=== YGEX ===
YGEX was established on April 12, 2011, as a partnership between Avex and YG for the promotion and release of all YG's material in Japan. Prior to this, YG's Japanese releases had been in partnership with Nexstar Records, a Nippon Columbia label that managed Japanese releases for Seven, and Universal Music Japan (which signed a three-year exclusive contract in 2008 for Big Bang's Japanese releases).

=== YG"MM ===
YG"MM was established in May 2021 as a form of collaboration with GMM Grammy, Thailand's largest entertainment company with a capital of 200 billion baht (US$5 billion), the company will focus on entertainment and consulting businesses for concerts, theater and acting. GMM Grammy is one of the longest-serving mainstream entertainment companies in Thailand having a number of music labels along with TV and film productions. GMM Grammy is set to hold a 51% stake in the company, while the other 49% belongs to YG Entertainment.

YG"MM is a fully integrated artist development company with the goal of making Thailand a comprehensive development base for artists. From the audition, training, creation, and promotion to becoming a professional artist, as well as organizing concerts, stage plays, and various performances in the future.

On September 27, 2021, YG"MM opened the audition for idol artists for the first time. In 2022, the company has unveiled their first big project, YG"MM Boy Audition 2022.

=== Other partnerships ===
==== United Asia Management ====
In April 2011, United Asia Management was formed as a joint talent management agency between YG, SM, JYP, KeyEast, AMENT, and Star J Entertainment.

==== Live Nation ====
YG first collaborated with Californian concert promotion company Live Nation to produce BigBang's Alive Galaxy Tour (2012). Live Nation subsequently directed 2NE1's New Evolution World Tour (2012) and G-Dragon's One of a Kind World Tour (2013). General Manager of Live Nation Asia, Mats Brandt, said in an interview that the company considered BigBang to have the most potential to become a "global artist".

==== Asiana Airlines ====
Asiana Airlines signed a deal with YG in January 2013, providing transportation for its personnel to and from domestic and international destinations in return for advertising.

== Subsidiaries ==
=== Sub-labels ===
==== YG Plus ====
YG Plus Inc., previously named Phoenix Holdings Inc., is a publicly traded media and advertising company acquired by YG Entertainment in November 2014. In 2019, the company entered the music distribution industry and also engages in production, distribution, and licensing of merchandise related to music artists. In January 2021, Hybe Corporation and its technology subsidiary, Weverse Company, acquired 17.9% of the company in a merchandising and distribution deal that would see YG Entertainment's artists join Weverse in return.

=== Associate labels ===
==== The Black Label ====
Former YG Entertainment headquarter in Seoul, currently occupied by The Black Label

Following the successful formation of HIGHGRND, on September 22, 2015, YG Entertainment announced the creation of another independent sub-label, to be headed by YG producers Teddy and Kush. On November 16, 2020, as per the quarterly stock report of YG Entertainment, the label was converted to an associate company status. In April 2023, The Black Label formed a joint venture with Thailand's largest conglomerate Charoen Pokphand called The Black Sea to expand its label into the Southeast Asian region. The label currently houses artists: Meovv, AllDay Project, Jeon Somi, Taeyang, Rosé, CL and Vince.

=== Former sub-labels ===
==== Highgrnd ====
Highgrnd (read as "high ground") was an independent sub-label headed by Epik High's Tablo. Announced in March 2015, the label was set up by Yang Hyun-suk under the YG Entertainment umbrella as part of a long-term goal to reach out to the Korean indie and alternative scene. On June 21, 2015, Tablo introduced the band Hyukoh via Instagram as the label's first official artist.

The company had fostered artists Millic, offonoff, Punchnello, Code Kunst, Way Ched, The Black Skirts, Idiotape, and Incredivle. However, on April 11, 2018, an article was released that Highgrnd was no longer active due to Tablo's resignation as CEO the previous year. As of the release of this article, the artists in the label soon revealed that they had signed in with other labels and had other companies to distribute their new releases that year. Epik High eventually left YG Entertainment in October as all three members declined to renew their contracts.

In June 2019, YG Plus took over the social media accounts of Highgrnd and relaunched them under the name SEOUL MUSIC.

==== PsyG ====
On September 1, 2016, representatives of YG announced that Psy would be leading an independent sub-label titled PsyG, a portmanteau of "Psy" and "YG". The label was registered as a corporate subsidiary in June and marked another chapter in the collaboration between Psy and long-time friend Yang Hyun-suk, as it was revealed that the YG CEO had implicitly promised the creation of a sub-label when Psy had signed on to the company in 2010 amidst personal difficulties, having been encouraged by his wife to work with the YG founder. As Psy left the company in mid-2018, PsyG has ended its operations and closed its doors.

==== YGX ====
Yang Hyun-suk announced, in May 2018, that a subsidiary company called YGX Entertainment would merge with Seungri's DJ label NHR. On June 4, on his official Instagram account, he posted a picture of a business card showing Seungri as the CEO of YGX. In 2018, the label launched a dance and vocal academy, called X ACADEMY, where students could potentially be scouted by YG as trainees.

In 2020, the label was converted to a full-fledged dance group and academy with all of its actors, recording artists, and producers transferred to YG Entertainment.

The YGX academy announced its end of operations on 30 April 2024.

=== KPlus ===
KPlus (formerly YG K+) is a partnership between YG and Chorokbaem Media as a Korean model management company. As of 2014, KPlus model agency housed over 170 models, including Kang Seung-hyun, Park Hyeong-seop, Lee Sung-kyung, Nam Joo-hyuk, Jang Ki-yong, Sandara Park, and Choi Sora. Since the partnership, KPlus models have appeared in YG recording artists' music videos, as well as YG-owned brands' advertisement campaigns. YG has also reportedly provided YG K+ models with roles in TV dramas, notably Nam Joo-hyuk in Who Are You: School 2015 and Lee Sung-kyung in It's Okay, That's Love, and have formally transitioned models to their acting division.

In May 2022, Chorokbaem Media acquired 50% of the company's shares. On August 22, 2022, it was announced that the company would change its name from YGKPLUS to KPLUS after the acquisition, while still collaborating with YG in the future.

== Philanthropy ==
YG pledged to donate 100 won for every album sold, 1% of all merchandise sales, and 1,000 won for every concert ticket, to charities. In 2009, they raised US$141,000, and in 2010 $160,000. The company has also directly delivered US$4,400 worth of charcoal to families in need during the winter season. It announced that it would be donating around US$500,000 for disaster relief to Japan after the 2011 Tōhoku earthquake and tsunami.

In 2013, Yang Hyun-suk made headlines when he donated all of the dividends he received as a shareholder of YG to help young children needing surgery. His dividends totalled around US$922,000.

In 2015, YG donated a total of ₩100 million (US$92,450) to the Korean Committee for UNICEF in disaster relief following the earthquake in Nepal.

In March 2022, YG donated ₩500 million to Hope Bridge Disaster Relief Association to help residents affected by wildfires in Uljin, Gyeongbuk, Samcheok, and Gangwon.

== Artists and producers ==
All musical artists under YG Entertainment are collectively known respectively as YG Family.

=== Recording artists ===
Groups

- BigBang
- 2NE1
- Winner
- Blackpink
- Treasure
- Babymonster

Project groups

- T5
- Hyunhayo

Soloists

- Eun Ji-won
- Yoon
- Mino
- Jinu
- Hoony

=== Producers ===
- YG
- Choice37
- Future Bounce
  - P.K
  - Dee.P
- Kang Uk-jin
- Airplay
- iHwak
- Rovin
- Bigtone
- Q
- Where the Noise
- Diggy
- Lil G
- Sonny
- LP
- Illjun
- Se.A
- Hae
- Ends
- 2K
- J.DOOR
- Lil Shark
- 1105

== Former artists, actors, producers and talents ==
=== Former artists ===
- Keep Six (1996)
- Jinusean (1997–2020) (Note: While no official disbandment was announced, Jinusean's artist profile was removed in 2020, signifying the group is no longer active under the label.)
- 1TYM (1998–2006) (Note: While no official disbandment was announced, 1TYM's artist profile was removed in 2014, signifying the group is no longer active under the label.)
- Perry (2001–?)
- Swi.T (2002–2005)
- Wheesung (2002–2006)
- Masta Wu (2003–2016)
- Digital Masta (2003–2011)
- Gummy (2003–2013)
- Big Mama (2003–2007)
- Seven (2003–2015)
- Lexy (2003–2007)
- XO (2003–2004)
- Wanted (2004–2006)
- Stony Skunk (2005–2008)
- 45RPM (2005–2008)
- SoulStaR (2005–2007)
- Moogadang (2006-?)
- BigBang (2006–2024) (Note: While no official disbandment was announced, Bigbang's artist profile was removed in 2024, signifying the group is no longer active under the label.)
  - Seungri (2006–2019)
  - T.O.P (2006–2022)
  - Taeyang (2006–2022)
  - Daesung (2006–2022)
  - G-Dragon (2006–2023)
- GD & TOP (2010–2022) (Note: While no official disbandment was announced, GD & TOP's artist profile was removed in 2022, signifying the group is no longer active under the label.)
- GD X Taeyang (2014–2023) (Note: While no official disbandment was announced, GD X Taeyang's artist profile was removed in 2023, signifying the group is no longer active under the label.)
- Jieun (2007–2008)
- YMGA (2008–2011)
- 2NE1 (2009–2017)
  - Minzy (2009–2016)
  - Park Bom (2009–2017)
  - CL (2009–2019)
  - Dara (2009–2021)
- Psy (2010–2018)
- Lee Hi (2012–2019)
- Epik High (2012–2018)
- AKMU (2014–2025)
  - Lee Su-hyun (2014–2025)
  - Lee Chan-hyuk (2014–2025)
- Winner
  - Taehyun (2014–2016)
- BOM&HI (2014–2017)
- Hi Suhyun (2014–2019) (Note: While no official disbandment was announced, Hi Suhyun's artist profile was removed in 2019, signifying the group is no longer active under the label.)
- HIGHGRND Artists (2015–2018) (Note: Artists: Hyukoh, Punchnello, OffonOff, Incredivle, The Black Skirts, Idiotape Producers: Way Ched, Code Kunst & Millic)
- Katie (2015–2018)
- One (2015–2019)
- iKon (2015–2022)
  - B.I (2015–2019)
  - Jay (2015–2022)
  - Song (2015–2022)
  - Bobby (2015–2022)
  - DK (2015–2022)
  - Ju-ne (2015–2022)
  - Chan (2015–2022)
- MOBB (2016–2019) (Note: While no official disbandment was announced, MOBB's artist profile was removed in 2019, signifying the group is no longer active under the label.)
- Sechs Kies (2016–2024) (Note: While no official disbandment was announced, Sechskies artist profile was removed in 2024, signifying the group is no longer active under the label.)
  - Kang Sung-hoon (2016–2019)
  - Lee Jai-jin (2016–2024)
  - Kim Jae-duck (2016–2024)
  - Jang Su-won (2016–2024)
- Blackpink (Note: Despite all 4 members no longer being under YG, they still promote as Blackpink under the label.)
  - Jisoo (2016–2023)
  - Jennie (2016–2023)
  - Rosé (2016–2023)
  - Lisa (2016–2023)
- Anda (2018–2021)
- Zayvo (2019–2020)
- Blue.D (2019–2020)
- Viini (2019–2024)
- Treasure
  - Mashiho (2020–2022)
  - Bang Ye-dam (2020–2022)
- Lee Sung-kyung (2023–2025)

=== Former producers ===
- Teddy (1998–2018)
- Kush (2003–2019)
- Brave Brothers (2004–2008)
- Ham Seung-chun
- Lydia Paek
- R.Tee (2016–2020)
- Millennium

=== Former actors ===
- Park Han-byul (2002–2004)
- Huh Yi-Jae (2008–2011)
- Jung Sung-il (2009–2011)
- Heo Yi-jae (2009–2011)
- Kang Hye-jung (2001–2013)
- Stephanie Lee (2014–2017)
- Lee Yong-woo (2014–2017)
- Koo Hye-sun (2003–2017)
- Jung Yoo-jin (2016–2018)
- Lee Jong-suk (2016–2018)
- Go Joon-hee (2017–2019)
- Oh Sang-jin (2017–2019)
- Kim Hee-jung (2016–2019)
- Kim Sae-ron (2016–2019)
- Im Ye-jin (2014–2019)
- Wang Ji-won (2018–2020)
- Nam Joo-hyuk (2013–2020)
- Sandara Park (2009–2021)
- Son Ho-jun (2016–2021)
- Jo Hye-joo (2017–2021)
- Lee Ji-ni (?–2021)
- Bae Jung-nam (2015–2021)
- Jung Yoon-seok (2019–2022) (Note: transferred from now-defunct YGX)
- Kwon Han-sol (2019–2022)
- Lee Hyun-wook (?–2022) (Note: formerly part of YGKPlus)
- Lee Woo-je (c. 2020–2022)
- Park Soo-yeon (?–2022)
- Park Tae-in (2019–2022)
- Seo Lee-seo (?–2022)
- Gang Dong-won (2016–2022)
- Kim Ji-soo (2016–2023)
- Choi Ji-woo (2014–2024)
- Kwon Hyun-bin (2019–2024)
- Kang Hui (?–2024)
- Mun Ji-hyo (?–2024)
- Yu Yeon-su (2021–2024)
- Jang Doek-su (?–2024)
- Cha Jae-yi (?–2024)
- Park Hyung-seop (?–2024)
- Choi Da-hye (?–2024)
- Shim Young-eun (2021–2024)
- Lee Joo-myung (2016–2024)
- Yoo Seung-ho (2022–2025)
- Kim Hee-ae (2016–2025)
- Cha Seung-won (2014–2025)
- Jang Hyun-sung (?–2025)
- Yoo In-na (2006–2025)
- Jung Hye-young (?–2025)
- Claudia Kim (2021–2025)
- Lee Sung-kyung (2014–2025)
- Jang Ki-yong (?–2025)
- Lee Soo-hyuk (2017–2025)
- Kyung Soo-jin (2018–2025)
- Han Seung-yeon (2020–2025)
- Son Na-eun (2021–2025)
- Seo Jeong-yeon (?–2025)
- Jin Kyung (2020–2025)
- Kal So-won (2014–2025)
- Park So-yi (2021–2025)
- Lee Ho-jung (2015–2025)
- Joo Woo-jae (?–2025)
- Lee Ki-taek (?–2025)
- Nam Kyu-hee (2020–2025)
- Park You-na (2023–2025)
- Kim Hyun-jin (2015–2025)
- Kim Seung-yun (?–2025)

=== Former talents ===
- Yoo Byung-jae (2015–2019)
- Ahn Young-mi (2015–2020)

== See also ==
- Korean hip hop
- List of South Korean musicians
