= BigBang discography =

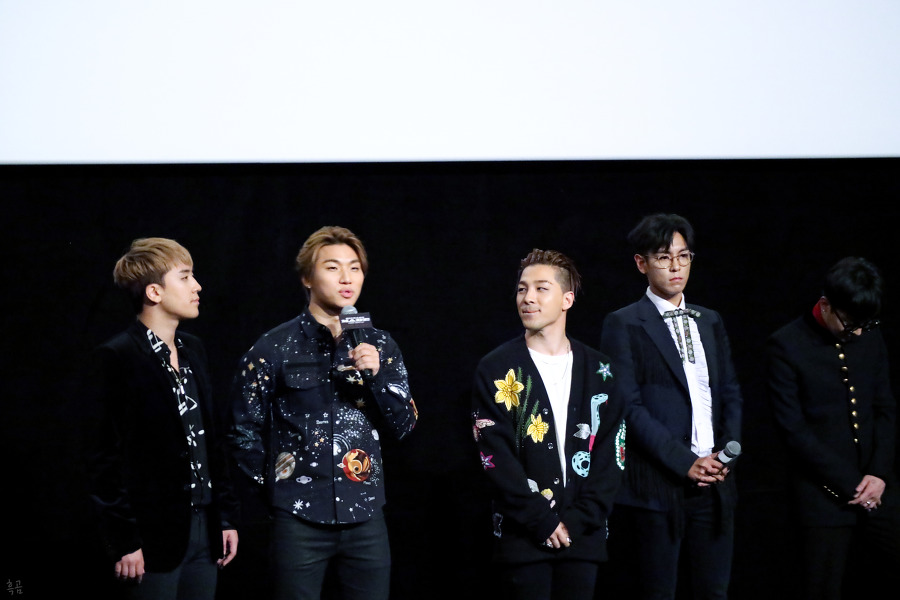
- BigBang at the premiere of their movie Big Bang Made on June 28, 2016
- Studio albums: 8
- Extended plays: 8
- Live albums: 10
- Compilation albums: 8
- Singles: 36
- Single albums: 7

South Korean boy band Big Bang have released eight studio albums, eight extended plays, two reissues, eight compilation albums, ten live albums, seven single albums, and 36 singles. As of May 2017, the group has sold over 4.3 million physical albums in South Korea and Japan alone.

BigBang's debut studio album was released in December 2006. It spawned several singles, including "La La La" and "A Fool's Only Tears". The group achieved commercial success with "Lies", the lead single of their first extended play, Always (2007), which topped the Melon Chart for six consecutive weeks. Their second and third extended plays followed their predecessor's success; Hot Issue (2007) yielded "Last Farewell" while Stand Up (2008) spawned "Haru Haru", which topped the Melon Chart for eight and seven consecutive weeks, respectively. Their second studio album, Remember (2008), was also a commercial success and yielded two hit singles in South Korea, "Sunset Glow" and "Strong Baby", with the latter being performed solely by member Seungri.

The group ventured into the Japanese market with two extended plays, For the World (2008) and With U (2008), as well as two studio albums, Number 1 (2009) and Big Bang (2009). The latter was promoted with two singles: "My Heaven", which debuted at number three on the Oricon Chart, and "Gara Gara Go!", which was certified gold by the Recording Industry Association of Japan (RIAJ).

They resumed their activities in South Korea in early 2009, with the release of the song "Lollipop" with their labelmate 2NE1, which was used to promote the LG Cyon's Lollipop phone. The song topped various online charts in South Korea and became an instant viral hit. In February 2011, BigBang returned to the Korean music scene after two years of hiatus with the release of their fourth Korean extended play, Tonight, which became their first number-one album on the Gaon Album Chart, which was established one year prior. The EP spawned a chart-topping single of the same name and was reissued as a repackaged album under the title Big Bang Special Edition, which spawned "Love Song", their second number-one hit. Later in the same year, BigBang released their second Japanese studio album, Big Bang 2 (2011), which topped the Oricon Albums Charts and was certified gold by the RIAJ. Two singles from the album, "Koe o Kikasete" and "Tell Me Goodbye", also received the same certification.

In 2012, BigBang released their fifth Korean extended play, Alive, which made the group the first ever Korean act to chart on the Billboard 200 with an album purely in the Korean language, debuting at number 150. The EP's lead single, "Blue", quickly topped all major music charts in South Korea while the next two singles, "Bad Boy" and "Fantastic Baby", charted at number two and three on the Gaon Digital Chart, respectively. All three singles from Alive charted separately at number three on the Billboard World Song Sales chart. The EP was later reissued under the title Still Alive (2012), which spawned the single "Monster", their fourth number-one hit on the Gaon Digital Chart.

After a three-year hiatus, BigBang made their comeback in mid-2015 by releasing four single albums from their first studio album in eight years, Made (2016). All songs from the album charted within the top three positions on the Gaon Digital Chart and Billboard World Digital Songs chart (with the exception of "Girlfriend"). BigBang's final release as a five-member group, "Flower Road", topped both the Gaon Digital Chart and the Billboard World Digital Songs chart in March 2018. It was eventually certified platinum by the Korea Music Content Association. In 2022, BigBang released the single "Still Life" as a four-member group, which topped the charts in South Korea, Hong Kong, Malaysia, Singapore and Vietnam.

== Albums ==
=== Korean studio albums ===
List of Korean studio albums, showing selected details, selected chart positions, sales figures and certifications
Title	Album details	Peak chart positions							Sales	Certifications
Title	Album details	KOR	FRA Dig.	JPN	UK Dig.	US	US Heat	US World	Sales	Certifications
Big Bang Vol.1	Released: December 21, 2006; Label: YG Entertainment; Format: CD, digital download	3 (Note: Prior to the Gaon Music Chart, which launched in 2010, the Music Industry Association of Korea (MIAK) compiled sales figures for music releases until 2008. The album Big Bang Vol.1, which was released in 2006, peaked at number three on the monthly MIAK chart for December 2006.)	—	—	—	—	—	—	KOR: 86,759	—N/a
Remember	Released: November 5, 2008; Label: YG Entertainment; Format: CD, digital download	5	—	—	—	—	—	—	KOR: 219,572	—N/a
Made	Released: December 12, 2016; Label: YG Entertainment, YGEX; Format: CD, digital download	1	39	1	67	172	1	1	KOR: 278,010; JPN: 138,203 (Note: Japan sales figures for Made as of July 2017.); US: 4,000	RIAJ: Gold
"—" denotes releases that did not chart or were not released in that region.

=== Japanese studio albums ===
List of Japanese studio albums, showing selected details, selected chart positions, sales figures and certifications
Title	Album details	Peak chart positions		Sales	Certifications
Title	Album details	JPN	JPN Sales	Sales	Certifications
Number 1	Released: October 22, 2008; Label: YG Entertainment Japan; Format: CD, digital download	13	16	—N/a	—N/a
Big Bang	Released: August 19, 2009; Label: Universal Music Japan; Format: CD, digital download	3	3	JPN: 67,285	RIAJ: Gold
Big Bang 2	Released: May 11, 2011; Label: Universal Music Japan; Format: CD, digital download	1	1	JPN: 98,854	RIAJ: Gold
Alive	Released: March 28, 2012; Re-released: June 20, 2012; Label: YGEX; Format: CD, digital download	3	3	JPN: 217,000	RIAJ: Gold
Made Series	Released: February 3, 2016; Label: YGEX; Format: CD, digital download	1	1	JPN: 202,600	RIAJ: Gold

=== Compilation albums ===
List of compilation albums, showing selected details, selected chart positions, sales figures and certifications
Title	Album details	Peak positions	Sales	Certifications
Title	Album details	JPN	Sales	Certifications
Asia Best 2006–2009	Released: August 19, 2009; Label: YG Entertainment Japan; Format: CD, digital download	20	—N/a	—N/a
The Ultimate: International Best	Released: May 25, 2011; Label: YG Entertainment Japan; Format: CD, digital download	7	—N/a	—N/a
The Best of Big Bang	Released: December 14, 2011; Label: YGEX; Format: CD, digital download	2	JPN: 100,000	RIAJ: Gold
BigBang the Non Stop Mix	Released: April 4, 2012; Label: YGEX; Format: CD, digital download	31	—N/a	—N/a
BigBang Best Selection	Released: June 6, 2012; Label: YGEX; Format: CD, digital download	47	JPN: 779	—N/a
BigBang Non Stop Mega Mix mixed by DJ Wildparty	Released: December 18, 2013; Label: YGEX; Format: CD, digital download	85	—N/a	—N/a
The Best of Big Bang 2006–2014	Released: November 26, 2014; Label: YGEX; Format: CD, digital download	1	JPN: 223,690	RIAJ: Gold
Best Selection Hi Quality CD	Released: October 17, 2015; Labels: Universal Music; Format: CD, digital download	169	—N/a	—N/a

=== Live albums ===
List of live albums, showing selected details, selected chart positions and sales figures
Title	Album details	Peak chart positions		Sales
Title	Album details	KOR	JPN	Sales
First Live Concert: The Real	Released: February 8, 2007; Label: YG Entertainment; Format: CD, digital download	—	—	KOR: 26,787
Second Live Concert: The Great	Released: February 29, 2008; Label: YG Entertainment; Format: CD, digital download	—	—	—N/a
2009 Big Show	Released: April 22, 2009; Label: YG Entertainment; Format: CD, digital download	—	5	—N/a
2010 Big Show	Released: August 19, 2010; Label: YG Entertainment; Format: CD, digital download	1	2	KOR: 37,161
2011 Big Show	Released: June 17, 2011; Label: YG Entertainment; Format: CD, digital download	1	2	KOR: 30,650
Alive Tour 2012: Live in Seoul	Released: January 10, 2013; Label: YG Entertainment; Format: CD, digital download	2	—	KOR: 20,126
Alive Galaxy Tour 2013: The Final in Seoul	Released: May 30, 2013; Label: YG Entertainment; Format: CD, digital download	1	—	KOR: 18,656
2014 BigBang +α in Seoul	Released: May 28, 2014; Label: YG Entertainment; Format: CD, digital download	16	—	KOR: 11,001
2016 Big Bang World Tour (Made) Final in Seoul Live	Released: June 3, 2016; Label: YG Entertainment; Format: CD, digital download	6	—	KOR: 15,102
Big Bang 10 the Concert 0.TO.10 Final in Seoul Live	Released: May 25, 2017; Label: YG Entertainment; Format: CD, digital download	—	—	—N/a
"—" denotes releases that did not chart or were not released in that region.

=== Box sets ===
List of box sets
Title	Album details	Notes	Ref.
BigBang10 The Vinyl LP: Limited Edition	Released: October 13, 2016; Label: YG Entertainment; Format: 7-inch record	A box set distributed exclusively by YG Entertainment. It consists of vinyl of 12 songs from Big Bang, posters of visual art works by members, 4 archive books about the group image, fashion, album, and the exhibition.	
BigBang10 The Collection – 'A to Z'	Released: October 25, 2016; Label: YG Entertainment; Format: Photo-book	A box set distributed exclusively by YG Entertainment. It consists of a new photoshoot from March 2016 to June 2016 from Big Bang, Eco bag and a film showing the making of the BIGBANG photo book	

== Extended plays ==
=== Korean extended plays ===
List of Korean extended plays, showing selected details, selected chart positions and sales figures
Title	EP details	Peak chart positions					Sales
Title	EP details	KOR	JPN	US	US Heat	US World	Sales
Always	Released: August 16, 2007; Label: YG Entertainment; Format: CD, digital download	11 (Note: The EP Always, peaked at number four on the monthly MIAK chart for September 2007.)	—	—	—	—	KOR: 101,089
Hot Issue	Released: November 22, 2007; Label: YG Entertainment; Format: CD, digital download	8	—	—	—	—	KOR: 94,405
Stand Up	Released: August 8, 2008; Label: YG Entertainment; Format: CD, digital download	9 (Note: The EP Stand Up, peaked at number two on the monthly MIAK chart for September 2008.)	—	—	—	—	KOR: 168,024
Tonight	Released: February 24, 2011; Label: YG Entertainment; Format: CD, digital download	1	10	—	7	3	KOR: 172,422; JPN: 27,000
Alive	Released: February 29, 2012; Label: YG Entertainment; Format: CD, digital download	1	6	150	4	4	KOR: 283,507; US: 4,100
"—" denotes releases that did not chart or were not released in that region.

=== Japanese extended plays ===
List of Japanese extended plays, showing selected details and selected chart positions
Title	EP details	Peak chart positions
Title	EP details	JPN
For the World	Released: January 4, 2008; Label: YG Entertainment Japan; Format: CD, digital download	53
With U	Released: May 28, 2008; Label: YG Entertainment Japan; Format: CD, digital download	45
Special Final in Dome Memorial Collection	Released: December 5, 2012; Label: YGEX; Format: CD, digital download	6

=== Reissues ===
List of reissues, showing selected details, selected chart positions and sales figures
Title	Album details	Peak chart positions			Sales
Title	Album details	KOR	US Heat	US World	Sales
Big Bang Special Edition	Released: April 8, 2011; Label: YG Entertainment; Format: CD, digital download	1	—	—	KOR: 99,309
Still Alive	Released: June 3, 2012; Label: YG Entertainment; Format: CD, digital download	1	20	3	KOR: 176,627
"—" denotes releases that did not chart or were not released in that region.

== Single albums ==
List of single albums, showing selected details, selected chart positions and sales figures
Title	Details	Peak chart positions		Sales
Title	Details	KOR (Note: Prior to September 2008, monthly album charts were published by the MIAK and RIAK.)	JPN	Sales
Big Bang First Single	Released: August 28, 2006; Label: YG Entertainment; Formats: CD, digital download	5	—	KOR: 54,333
Big Bang Is V.I.P	Released: September 28, 2006; Label: YG Entertainment; Formats: CD, digital download	8	—	KOR: 39,232
Big Bang 03	Released: November 21, 2006; Label: YG Entertainment; Formats: CD, digital download	7	—	KOR: 32,348
M	Released: May 1, 2015; Label: YG Entertainment; Formats: CD, digital download	1	—	KOR: 141,109
A	Released: June 1, 2015; Label: YG Entertainment; Formats: CD, digital download	2	—	KOR: 104,849
D	Released: July 1, 2015; Label: YG Entertainment; Formats: CD, digital download	1	16	KOR: 96,689; JPN: 9,000
E	Released: August 5, 2015; Label: YG Entertainment; Formats: CD, digital download	1	15	KOR: 129,680; JPN: 13,888
"—" denotes releases that did not chart or were not released in that region.

== Singles ==
=== As lead artist ===
==== 2000s ====
List of singles released in the 2000s decade, showing year released, selected chart positions, sales, certifications, and associated album
Title	Year	Peak chart positions						Sales	Certifications	Album
Title	Year	KOR	JPN	JPN Hot	SGP	TWN	US World	Sales	Certifications	Album
"We Belong Together" (featuring Park Bom)	2006	—	—	—	—	—	—	—N/a	—N/a	Big Bang First Single
"La La La"	2006	—	—	—	—	—	—	—N/a	—N/a	Big Bang Is V.I.P
"Forever with U" (featuring Park Bom)	2006	—	—	—	—	—	—	—N/a	—N/a	Big Bang 03
"Dirty Cash"	2006	—	—	—	—	—	—	—N/a	—N/a	Vol.1
"Lies" (거짓말)	2007	105 (Note: Charted in 2024 and 2025.)	—	—	—	—	24	—N/a	—N/a	Always
"Last Farewell" (마지막 인사)	2007	—	—	—	—	—	—	—N/a	—N/a	Hot Issue
"How Gee"	2008	—	—	—	—	—	—	—N/a	—N/a	For the World
"With U"	2008	—	—	—	—	—	—	—N/a	—N/a	With U
"Haru Haru" (하루하루)	2008	78 (Note: Charted in 2026.)	—	—	12 (Note: Charted in 2026.)	20 (Note: Charted in 2026.)	13	—N/a	—N/a	Stand Up
"Number 1"	2008	—	—	—	—	—	—	—N/a	—N/a	Number 1
"Sunset Glow" (붉은 노을)	2008	80	—	—	—	—	—	—N/a	—N/a	Remember
"My Heaven"	2009	—	3	4	—	—	—	—N/a	—N/a	Big Bang
"Gara Gara Go!" (ガラガラ GO!)	2009	—	5	15	—	—	—	JPN: 100,000	RIAJ: Gold (dig.)	Big Bang
"Bringing You Love"	2009	—	—	88	—	—	—	—N/a	—N/a	Big Bang
"Koe o Kikasete" (声をきかせて)	2009	—	4	10	—	—	—	JPN: 250,000	RIAJ: Platinum (dig.); RIAJ: Gold (str.)	Big Bang 2
"—" denotes a single that did not chart or was not released in that territory.

==== 2010s ====
List of singles released in the 2010s decade, showing year released, selected chart positions, sales, certifications, and associated album
Title	Year	Peak chart positions								Sales	Certifications	Album
Title	Year	KOR	KOR Hot (Note: The K-pop Hot 100 was first published on August 25, 2011. Chart data was temporarily discontinued from May 2014 to June 2017.)	CAN	FIN Dig. (Note: The Official Finnish Download chart was launched in 2007 and discontinued in November 2017.)	JPN	JPN Hot	UK Indie	US World	Sales	Certifications	Album
"Tell Me Goodbye"	2010	34	—	—	—	5	16	—	—	KOR: 288,000; JPN: 100,000	RIAJ: Gold (dig.)	Big Bang 2
"Beautiful Hangover"	2010	—	—	—	—	7	14	—	—	—N/a	—N/a	Big Bang 2
"Tonight" (Note: Released in Japan in mid 2011. Japan Hot 100 combined Korean and Japanese version in one.)	2011	1	—	—	—	—	65	—	19	KOR: 2,454,000; JPN: 100,000	RIAJ: Gold (dig.)	Tonight
"Love Song"	2011	1	—	—	—	—	—	—	2	KOR: 2,118,000	—N/a	Big Bang Special Edition
"Blue"	2012	1	1	—	—	—	—	—	3	KOR: 3,568,000	—N/a	Alive
"Bad Boy"	2012	2	3	—	—	—	—	—	3	KOR: 2,368,000	—N/a	Alive
"Fantastic Baby" (Note: Released in Japan in 2012 one month after the Korean version. Japan Hot 100 combined Korean and Japanese version in one.)	2012	3	2	—	—	—	8	—	3	KOR: 4,036,000; JPN: 500,000	RIAJ: 2× Platinum (dig.); RIAJ: Platinum (str.)	Alive
"Monster" (Note: Released in Japan in mid 2012 the same month as the Korean version. Japan Hot 100 combined Korean and Japanese version in one.)	2012	1	1	—	—	—	6	—	3	KOR: 2,439,000	—N/a	Still Alive
"Loser"	2015	1	—	—	26	—	42	— (Note: "Loser" peaked at number 9 on the UK Independent Singles Breakers chart.)	1	KOR: 1,842,000; US: 9,000	—N/a	Made
"Bae Bae"	2015	2	—	—	30	—	69	—	2	KOR: 1,739,000; US: 8,000	—N/a	Made
"Bang Bang Bang" (뱅뱅뱅) (Note: Released in Japan in 2016. Japan Hot 100 combined Korean and Japanese version in one.)	2015	1	—	—	30	—	2	44	1	KOR: 2,500,000; JPN: 100,000; US: 11,000	RIAJ: Gold (dig.); RIAJ: Platinum (str.); RMNZ: Gold	Made
"We Like 2 Party"	2015	3	—	—	—	—	27	—	2	KOR: 1,206,000; US: 7,000	—N/a	Made
"If You"	2015	1	—	—	—	—	29	— (Note: "If You" peaked at number 11 on the UK Independent Singles Breakers chart.)	2	KOR: 1,445,000	—N/a	Made
"Sober" (맨정신)	2015	2	—	—	—	—	24	—	3	KOR: 1,317,000	—N/a	Made
"Zutter" (쩔어) (GD & TOP)	2015	2	—	—	30	—	—	— (Note: "Zutter" peaked at number 15 on the UK Independent Singles Breakers chart.)	2	KOR: 1,015,000; US: 6,000	—N/a	Made
"Let's Not Fall in Love" (우리 사랑하지 말아요)	2015	1	—	—	—	—	82	—	1	KOR: 1,400,000; US: 7,000	—N/a	Made
"Fxxk It" (에라 모르겠다)	2016	1	—	98	23	—	7	—	2	KOR: 2,500,000; US: 6,000	—N/a	Made
"Last Dance"	2016	2	—	—	—	—	9	—	3	KOR: 1,201,000; US: 4,000	—N/a	Made
"Flower Road" (꽃길)	2018	1	2	—	—	— (Note: "Flower Road" did not enter Oricon Singles Chart, but peaked at number three on the Oricon Digital Singles Chart.)	10	—	1	KOR: 2,500,000; JPN: 20,170; US: 5,000	KMCA: Platinum (dig.); KMCA: Platinum (str.)	Non-album single
"—" denotes a single that did not chart or was not released in that territory.

==== 2020s ====
List of singles released in the 2020s decade, showing year released, selected chart positions, sales, and associated album
Title	Year	Peak chart positions										Sales	Certifications	Album
Title	Year	KOR	CAN	HK	JPN Cmb.	JPN Hot	MLY (Note: Prior the establishment of the Official Malaysia Chart on 23 January 2025, the RIM International Chart was used.)	SGP	TWN	VIE Hot	WW	Sales	Certifications	Album
"Still Life" (봄여름가을겨울)	2022	1	87	1	11	7	1	1	3	1	9	JPN: 11,904; WW: 29,700	KMCA: Platinum (str.)	Non-album singles
"Biiig"	2026	3	—	13	— (Note: "Biiig" did not enter the Oricon Combined Singles Chart, but peaked at number 7 on the digital download component chart.)	77	13	7	3	22	124	JPN: 2,427		Non-album singles
"GiiiRIP"	2026													
"—" denotes a single that did not chart or was not released in that territory.

=== Promotional singles ===
List of promotional singles, showing year released, selected chart positions, sales, and associated album
Title	Year	Peak position	Sales	Album
Title	Year	KOR	Sales	Album
"Stylish"	2008	—	—N/a	Gara Gara Go! (single)
"Lollipop" (with 2NE1)	2009	—	KOR: 3,000,000	2NE1
"So Fresh So Cool"	2009	—	—N/a	Non-album singles
"Lollipop Pt. 2"	2010	3	KOR: 1,337,000	Non-album singles
"The Shouts of Red Part 2" (with Trans Fixion ft. Yuna Kim)	2010	47	—N/a	Non-album singles
"The North Face Song"	2011	—	—N/a	Non-album singles
"Never Stop Dreaming"	2012	—	—N/a	Non-album singles
"—" denotes releases that did not chart or were not released in that region.

== Other charted songs ==
List of other charted songs, showing year released, selected chart positions, sales, and associated album
Title	Year	Peak chart positions			Sales	Album
Title	Year	KOR	KOR Hot	US World	Sales	Album
"Cafe"	2011	2	—	—	KOR: 1,563,637	Tonight
"What Is Right"	2011	3	—	—	KOR: 1,310,288	Tonight
"Somebody to Love"	2011	5	—	—	KOR: 963,732	Tonight
"Hands Up"	2011	7	—	—	KOR: 828,404	Tonight
"Intro (Thank You & You)"	2011	20	—	—	KOR: 110,148	Tonight
"Stupid Liar"	2011	3	—	6	KOR: 1,275,166	Big Bang Special Edition
"Baby Don't Cry" (Daesung solo)	2011	3	—	19	KOR: 368,679	Big Bang Special Edition
"Intro (Alive)"	2012	18	11	12	KOR: 593,718	Alive
"Love Dust" (사랑먼지)	2012	3	2	6	KOR: 1,892,834	Alive
"Ain't No Fun" (재미없어)	2012	6	8	7	KOR: 1,371,815	Alive
"Wings" (날개) (Daesung solo)	2012	8	12	10	KOR: 1,096,474	Alive
"Still Alive"	2012	3	5	5	KOR: 1,349,551	Still Alive
"Ego"	2012	4	10	8	KOR: 876,736	Still Alive
"Feeling"	2012	5	11	9	KOR: 727,415	Still Alive
"Bingle Bingle" (빙글빙글)	2012	6	12	7	KOR: 752,952	Still Alive
"Girlfriend"	2016	3	—	4	KOR: 548,948; US: 3,000	Made
"—" denotes releases that did not chart or were not released in that region.

== See also ==
- List of songs recorded by Big Bang
- Big Bang videography

Individual discographies

- G-Dragon
- Taeyang
- T.O.P
- Daesung
- Seungri

Sub-units

- GD & TOP discography
- GD X TAEYANG discography
