= List of songs recorded by BigBang =

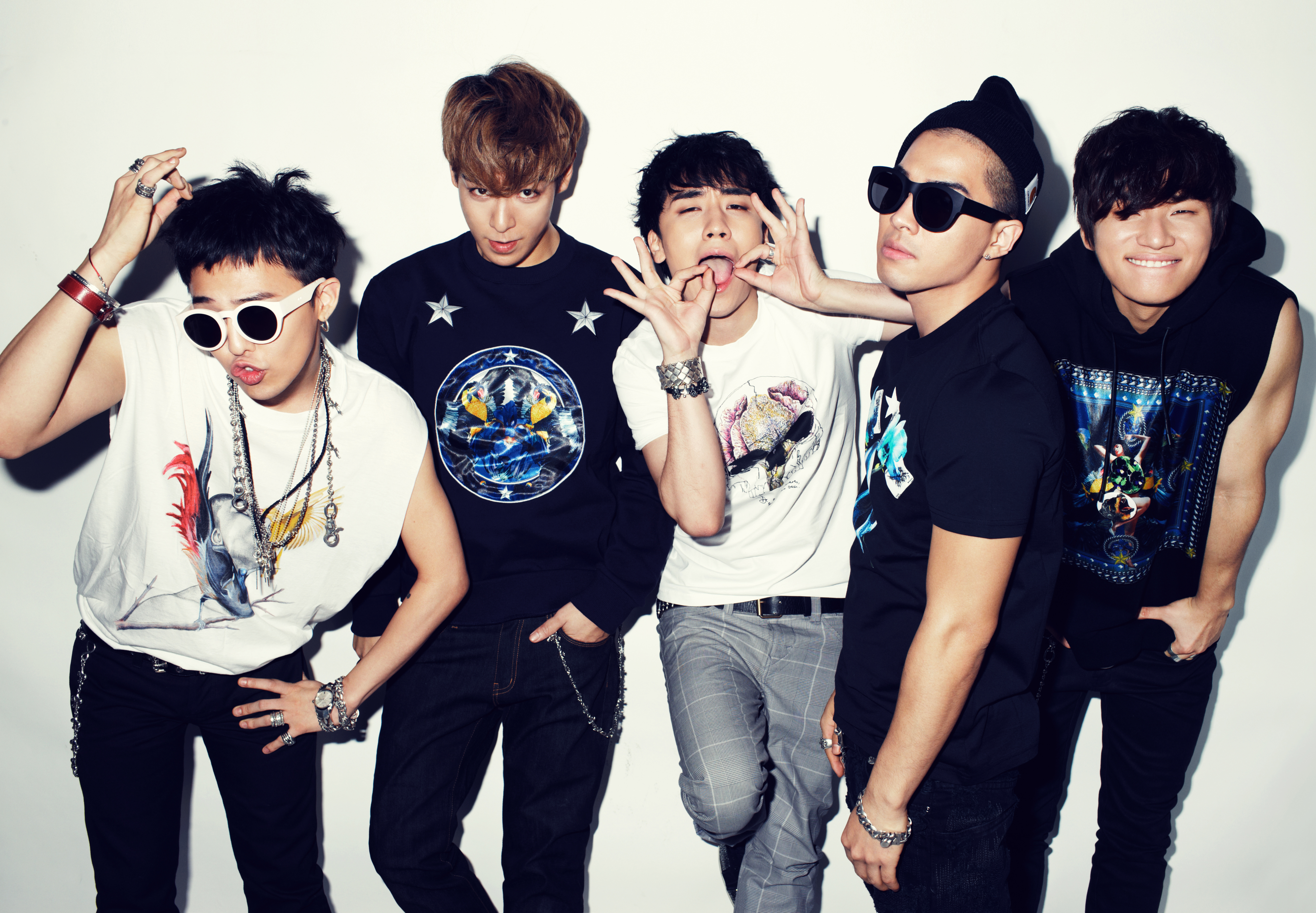
Big Bang in 2012

South Korean boy band Big Bang have released three Korean-language studio albums, five Japanese-language studio albums, five Korean EPs, two Japanese EPs, six Japanese compilations albums, 27 Korean singles, and eight Japanese singles. BigBang is known for composing and producing their own music, especially G-Dragon.

== Group released songs ==
Key
†	Indicates single release
#	Indicates song not written by anyone from BigBang

Song	Writer(s)	Originating album	Language	Year
"A Fool of Tears" †	G-Dragon, An Young Min	Bigbang Vol.1 / First Single	Korean	2006
"A Good Man"	T.o.p	Stand Up	Korean	2008
"Ain't No Fun"	G-Dragon, T.O.P	Alive	Korean	2012
"Ain't No Fun"	G-Dragon, T.O.P	Alive	Korean	2012
"Always" †	G-Dragon, Teddy	Always	Korean	2012
"Always" †	BigBang, Perry, Rina Moon	Number 1 / For the World		
"Always" †	Rina Moon #	Big Bang		
"Bad Boy" †	G-Dragon, T.O.P	Alive		
"Bad Boy" †	G-Dragon	Alive		
"Bae Bae" †	G-Dragon, Teddy, T.O.P	MADE / M	Korean	2015
"Bang Bang Bang" †	Teddy, G-Dragon, T.O.P		Korean	2015
"Bang Bang Bang" †	Verbal #	Made Series	Japanese	2016
"Beautiful Hangover" †	G-Dragon, SHIKATA, iNoZzi, Perry Borja	Big Bang 2	Japanese	2011
"Big Bang"	G-Dragon	Third Single	Korean	2006
"Big Bang"	Perry, G-Dragon	For the World	English	2008
"Bingle Bingle" ("Round and Round")	G-Dragon	Alive Monster Edition	Japanese	2012
"Bingle Bingle" ("Round and Round")	G-Dragon, T.O.P	Still Alive	Korean	2012
"Blue" †	G-Dragon, Teddy, T.O.P	Alive	Korean	2012
"Blue" †	G-Dragon	Alive	Japanese	2012
"Bringing You Love"	G-Dragon	Big Bang	Japanese	2009
"Café"	G-Dragon, T.O.P	Tonight	Korean	2011
"Candle"	Perry, BigBang, Komu	Number 1	Japanese	2008
"Come Be My Lady"	Jimmy Thornfeldt, Martin Hanzen, Mohombi Moupondo #	Number 1	English	2008
"Crazy Dog"	G-Dragon	Hot Issue	Korean	2007
"Dirty Cash" †	Hang	Bigbang Vol.1	Korean	2006
"Ego"	G-Dragon, T.O.P	Still Alive	Korean	2012
"Ego"	G-Dragon	Alive	Japanese	2012
"Emotion"	G-Dragon, Komu	Big Bang	Japanese	2009
"Everything"	Perry #	Number 1	English	2008
"Fantastic Baby" †	G-Dragon, T.O.P	Alive EP	Korean	2012
"Fantastic Baby" †	G-Dragon, Verbal	Alive	Japanese	2012
"Feeling"	G-Dragon, T.O.P	Still Alive	Korean	2012
"Feeling"	G-Dragon	Alive	Japanese	2012
"Flower Road"	G-Dragon, T.O.P	—N/a	Korean	2018
"Follow Me"	Steve I #	Big Bang	Japanese	2009
"Fool" ("Mad About You")	G-Dragon	Hot Issue	Korean	2007
"Fool" ("Mad About You")	G-Dragon	With U	Japanese	2008
"Foolish Love"	G-Dragon	Remember	Korean	2008
"Forever With U" (feat. Park Bom) † (Note: Performed by G-Dragon and T.O.P)	G-Dragon, T.O.P	Third Single	Korean	2006
"Fxxk It" †	Teddy, G-Dragon, T.O.P	MADE	Korean	2016
"Gara Gara Go!" †	BIG-RON / Shion / Ricci / YUG JAPAN #	Big Bang	Japanese	2009
"Girlfriend"	Teddy, G-Dragon, T.O.P	MADE	Korean	2016
"Good Bye Baby" †	Taeyang, G-Dragon, T.O.P	Third Single	Korean	2006
"Hallelujah" (Note: Performed by G-Dragon, T.O.P and Taeyang)	G-Dragon	Iris: Original Sound Track	Korean	2009
"Hands Up"	G-Dragon, T.O.P	Big Bang 2	Japanese	2011
"Hands Up"	G-Dragon, T.O.P	Tonight	Korean	2011
"Haru Haru" †	G-Dragon	Stand Up	Korean	2008
"Haru Haru" †	Shikata, iNoZzi, Shoko Fujibayashi, G-Dragon	Number 1	Japanese	2008
"Heaven" ("My Heaven") (Note: The Japanese version was released as a single)	G-Dragon	Stand Up	Korean	2008
"Heaven" ("My Heaven")	G-Dragon, Fujibayashi Shoko, Komu	Number 1 / Big Bang	Japanese	2008
"How Gee" †	BigBang, Perry	Number 1 / For the World	English	2008
"I Don't Understand"	G-Dragon	Hot Issue	Korean	2007
"If You"†	G-Dragon	MADE / D	Korean	2015
"If You"†	Shoko Fujibayashi #	Made Series	Japanese	2016
"Intro (Alive)"	G-Dragon, Teddy, T.O.P	Alive	Korean	2012
"Intro (Alive)"	G-Dragon, Teddy, T.O.P	Alive	Japanese	2012
"Intro (Big Bang)"	G-Dragon	Bigbang Vol.1	Korean	2006
"Intro (Everybody Scream)"	G-Dragon	Remember	Korean	2008
"Intro (Hot Issue)" (feat. CL)	G-Dragon	Hot Issue	Korean	2007
"Intro (Put Your Hands Up)"	G-Dragon	First Single	Korean	2006
"Intro (Stand Up)"	G-Dragon	Stand Up	Korean	2008
"Intro (Thank You & You)"	G-Dragon	Tonight	Korean	2011
"Intro (Thank You & You)"	G-Dragon	Big Bang 2	Japanese	2011
"Intro"	G-Dragon	Number 1	Japanese	2008
"Koe o Kikasete" †	Yamamoto Narumi, Robin #	Big Bang 2	Japanese	2011
"La La La" †	BigBang	Bigbang Vol.1 / Second Single	Korean	2006
"La La La" †	Perry, BigBang	For the World	English	2008
"Lady"	G-Dragon	Stand Up	Korean	2008
"Last Dance" †	G-Dragon, T.O.P, Taeyang	MADE	Korean	2016
"Last Farewell" ("Baby Baby") †	G-Dragon	Hot Issue	Korean	2007
"Last Farewell" ("Baby Baby") †	Perry, Emi K.Lynn #	Number 1 / With U	English	2008
"Last Farewell" ("Baby Baby") †	Emi K.Lynn #	Big Bang	Japanese	2009
"Let's Not Fall in Love" †	Teddy, G-Dragon	MADE / E	Korean	2015
"Lies" †	G-Dragon	Always	Korean	2007
"Lies" †	Perry, G-Dragon	For the World	English	2008
"Loser" †	Teddy, T.O.P, Taeyang, G-Dragon	MADE / M	Korean	2015
"Loser" †	Sunny Boy #	Made Series	Japanese	2016
"Love Club"	Rina Moon #	Big Bang	Japanese	2009
"Lollipop" (with 2NE1) † (Note: Recorded as an advertisement for the Ly Cyon Lollipop phone)	Teddy Park #	2NE1	Korean	2009
"Lollipop Pt. 2" † (Note: Recorded as an advertisement for the Ly Cyon Lollipop phone)	Teddy, G-Dragon, T.O.P	—N/a	Korean	2010
"Love Dust"	G-Dragon, Teddy, T.O.P	Alive	Korean	2012
"Love Dust"	G-Dragon, Teddy, T.O.P	Alive	Japanese	2012
"Love Song" †	G-Dragon, T.O.P, Teddy	Big Bang Special Edition	Korean	2011
"Love Song" †	G-Dragon, Teddy, T.O.P	Big Bang 2	Japanese	2011
"Make Love"	Kush, Daniel Im, Steve-I #	Number 1	English	2008
"Monster" †	G-Dragon, T.O.P	Still Alive	Korean	2012
"Monster" †	G-Dragon	Alive Monster Edition	Japanese	2012
"The North Face Song" (Note: Recorded as an advertisement for The North Face Korea)	G-Dragon	—N/a	Korean	2011
"Number 1" †	Jimmy Thornfeldt, Martin #	Number 1	English	2008
"Oh Ma Baby"	G-Dragon	Always	Korean	2007
"Oh My Friend" (feat. No Brain)	G-Dragon	Stand Up	Korean	2008
"Oh, Ah, Oh"	G-Dragon	Remember	Korean	2008
"Ora Yeah!"	Fujibayashi Shoko #	Big Bang 2	Japanese	2011
"Remember"	Yang Hyun Suk #	Remember	Korean	2008
"Remember"	Yang Hyun Suk, G-Dragon, T.O.P	Number 1	English	2008
"Shake It" (feat Lee Eun-ju) †	G-Dragon	Bigbang Vol.1	Korean	2006
"Shake It" (feat Lee Eun-ju) †	G-Dragon	With U	English	2008
"She Can't Get Enough"	G-Dragon, Kim Ina	Bigbang Vol.1	Korean	2006
"Sober" †	Teddy, G-Dragon, T.O.P	MADE / D	Korean	2015
"So Fresh, So Cool" (Note: Recorded as an advertisement for Hite Brewery)	G-Dragon	—N/a	Korean	2009
"Somebody to Love" ("Somebody to Luv")	G-Dragon, T.O.P	Tonight	Korean	2011
"Somebody to Love" ("Somebody to Luv")	G-Dragon, T.O.P	Big Bang 2	Japanese	2011
"Stay"	Fujibayashi Shoko #	Big Bang	Japanese	2009
"Still Alive"	G-Dragon, Teddy Park, T.O.P	Still Alive	Korean	2012
"Still Alive"	G-Dragon	Alive Monster Edition	Japanese	2012
"Stupid Liar" ("Ms. Liar")	G-Dragon, T.O.P	Big Bang Special Edition	Korean	2011
"Stupid Liar" ("Ms. Liar")	G-Dragon, T.O.P	Big Bang 2	Japanese	2011
"Sunset Glow" †	G-Dragon	Remember	Korean	2008
"Stylish"	G-Dragon	Gara Gara Go!	Japanese	2009
"Tell Me Goodbye" †	Fujibayashi Shouko, Perry, Taeyang	Big Bang 2	Japanese	2011
"Together Forever"	Perry, BigBang	For the World / With U	English	2008
"Tonight" †	G-Dragon, T.O.P	Tonight	Korean	2011
"Tonight" †	G-Dragon, T.O.P	Big Bang 2	Japanese	2011
"Top of the World"	Shikata #	Big Bang	Japanese	2009
"Twinkle Twinkle"	Kush #	Remember	Korean	2008
"Until Whenever"	G-Dragon	Global Warning Tour DVD	Korean	2008
"V.I.P"	BigBang	For the World	English	2008
"V.I.P"	BigBang	Second Single	Korean	2006
"Victory (Intro)"	G-Dragon	Third Single	Korean	2006
"We are Big Bang (Intro)"	BigBang	Always	Korean	2007
"We Belong Together" (feat. Park Bom) † (Note: Performed by G-Dragon and T.O.P)	G-Dragon, T.O.P	First Single	Korean	2006
"We Like 2 Party" †	Teddy, Kush, G-Dragon, T.O.P	MADE / A	Korean	2015
"What is Right"	G-Dragon, T.O.P	Tonight	Korean	2011
"With U" †	G-Dragon, Perry	Number 1 / With U	English	2008
"Wonderful"	G-Dragon	Remember	Korean	2008
"Wrong Number" ("So Beautiful")	Yang Hyun Suk #	Always	Korean	2007
"Wrong Number" ("So Beautiful")	BigBang, Perry	Number 1 / For the World	English	2008

== Solo released songs ==
Key
†	Indicates single release
#	Indicates song not written by anyone from BigBang

=== G-Dragon ===
Song	Writer(s)	Originating album	Language	Year
"This Love" †	G-Dragon	Bigbang Vol.1	Korean	2006
"But I Love U"	G-Dragon	Hot Issue	Korean	2007
"A Boy" †	G-Dragon	Heartbreaker	Korean	2009
"Heartbreaker" †	G-Dragon	Heartbreaker	Korean	2009
"Breathe" †	G-Dragon	Heartbreaker	Korean	2009
"Butterfly"(feat. Jin Jung) †	G-Dragon	Heartbreaker	Korean	2009
"Hello" (feat. Sandara Park)	G-Dragon	Heartbreaker	Korean	2009
"Gossip Man" (feat. Kim Gun-mo)	G-Dragon	Heartbreaker	Korean	2009
"Korean Dream" (feat. Taeyang)	G-Dragon	Heartbreaker	Korean	2009
"The Leaders" (feat. Teddy Park & CL)	G-Dragon, Teddy, CL	Heartbreaker	Korean	2009
"She's Gone" (feat. Kush)	G-Dragon	Heartbreaker	Korean	2009
"1 Year Station"	G-Dragon	Heartbreaker	Korean	2009
"Obsession"	G-Dragon	GD & TOP	Korean	2010
"What Do You Want?"	G-Dragon	GD & TOP	Korean	2010
"One of a Kind" †	G-Dragon	One of a Kind	Korean	2012
"Crayon" †	G-Dragon, Teddy	One of a Kind	Korean	2012
"Without You" (feat. Rosé)	G-Dragon	One of a Kind	Korean	2012
"That XX" †	G-Dragon, Teddy	One of a Kind	Korean	2012
"That XX" †	G-Dragon, Verbal	Coup d'Etat + One of a Kind & Heartbreaker	Japanese	2013
"Missing You" (feat. Kim Yoon-ah)	G-Dragon, Teddy	One of a Kind	Korean	2012
"Today" (feat. Kim Jong Wan)	G-Dragon	One of a Kind	Korean	2012
"Light it Up"(feat. Tablo & Dok2) (Note: Only available in the physical edition)	G-Dragon, Tablo, Dok2	One of a Kind	Korean	2012
"Coup d'Etat" (feat. Diplo & Baauer) †	G-Dragon	Coup d'Etat	Korean	2013
"Niliria" (feat. Missy Elliott)	G-Dragon, Missy Elliott	Coup d'Etat	Korean	2013
"R.O.D" (feat. Lydia Paek)	Teddy, G-Dragon, Choice37	Coup d'Etat	Korean	2013
"Black" (feat. Jennie Kim or Park Bom or Sky Ferreira) (Note: The Japanese version features Park Bom. Another version with an English chorus features Sky Ferreira.)	Teddy, G-Dragon	Coup d'Etat	Korean	2013
"Black" (feat. Jennie Kim or Park Bom or Sky Ferreira)	Teddy, G-Dragon, Verbal	Coup d'Etat + One of a Kind & Heartbreaker	Japanese	2013
"Who You?" †	G-Dragon	Coup d'Etat	Korean	2013
"Shake the World"	G-Dragon	Coup d'Etat	Korean	2013
"MichiGO" †	G-Dragon	Coup d'Etat	Korean	2013
"Crooked" †	G-Dragon, Teddy	Coup d'Etat	Korean	2013
"Crooked" †	G-Dragon, Teddy, Verbal	Coup d'Etat + One of a Kind & Heartbreaker	Japanese	2013
"Niliria (G-Dragon ver.)"	G-Dragon, Teddy	Coup d'Etat	Korean	2013
"Runaway"	G-Dragon	Coup d'Etat	Korean	2013
"I Love It" (feat. Zion.T & Boys Noize)	G-Dragon	Coup d'Etat	Korean	2013
"You Do (Outro)"	G-Dragon	Coup d'Etat	Korean	2013
"Window" (Note: Only available in the physical edition)	G-Dragon, Teddy	Coup d'Etat	Korean	2013
"Middle Fingers-Up"	G-Dragon	Kwon Ji Yong	Korean	2017
"Bullshit"	G-Dragon	Kwon Ji Yong	Korean	2017
"Super Star"	G-Dragon, Teddy, Joe Rhee	Kwon Ji Yong	Korean	2017
"Untitled, 2014"	G-Dragon	Kwon Ji Yong	Korean	2017
"Divina Commedia"	G-Dragon, 8!, Brian Lee, Safe, Frank Dukes	Kwon Ji Yong	Korean	2017

and Übermensch (2025)

=== Taeyang ===
Song	Writer(s)	Originating album	Language	Year
"My Girl" †	G-Dragon	Bigbang Vol.1	Korean	2006
"Intro - Hot"	G-Dragon	Hot	Korean	2008
"Prayer" (feat. Teddy Park) †	Teddy #	Hot	Korean	2008
"Only Look at Me" †	Teddy #	Hot	Korean	2008
"Sinner"	Yang Hyun Suk #	Hot	Korean	2008
"Baby I'm Sorry"	G-Dragon	Hot	Korean	2008
"Make Love" (feat. Kush)	Kush #	Hot	Korean	2008
"Solar (Intro)"	Choice37 #	Solar	Korean	2010
"Superstar"	Teddy #	Solar	Korean	2010
"I Need a Girl" (feat. G-Dragon) †	Jeon Goon, Choi Gap-Won, G-Dragon	Solar / Big Bang Special Edition	Korean	2010
"Just a Feeling"	Teddy #	Solar	Korean	2010
"You're My"	Jeon Goon, Choi Gap-Won #	Solar	Korean	2010
"Move" (feat. Teddy Park)	Kush #	Solar	Korean	2010
"Break Down"	Teddy #	Solar	Korean	2010
"After You Fall Asleep" (feat. Swings)	G-Dragon, Swings	Solar	Korean	2010
"Where U At" †	Teddy #	Solar	Korean	2009
"Take it Slow"	Taeyang	Solar	Korean	2010
"Wedding Dress" †	Teddy #	Solar	Korean	2009
"Wedding Dress" †	Teddy #	Solar International Edition	English	2010
"I'll Be There" †	Perry #	Solar International Edition	Korean	2010
"I'll Be There" †	Perry #	Solar International Edition	English	2010
"Connection" (feat. Big Tone)	Big Tone, Walt Anderson #	Solar International Edition	English	2010
"Intro (Rise)"	Taeyang, Tablo, Choice37	RISE	Korean	2014
"Eyes, Nose, Lips" †	Taeyang, Teddy	RISE	Korean	2014
"Eyes, Nose, Lips" †	Taeyang, Teddy, Verbal	Rise (+ Solar & Hot)	Japanese	2014
"1AM" †	Teddy #	RISE	Korean	2014
"1AM" †	Teddy, Verbal #	Rise (+ Solar & Hot)	Japanese	2014
"Stay with Me" (feat. G-Dragon)	G-Dragon	RISE	Korean	2014
"Body"	Taeyang, Teddy	RISE	Korean	2014
"Ringa Linga" †	G-Dragon, Shockbit	RISE	Korean	2013
"Ringa Linga" †	G-Dragon, Verbal	Rise (+ Solar & Hot)	Japanese	2014
"This Ain't It"	Airplay, Jo Sung Hwak #	RISE	Korean	2014
"Let Go"	Tablo #	RISE	Korean	2014
"Love You to Death"	Tablo, Britt Burton #	RISE	Korean	2014
"White Night"	Taeyang, Joe Rhee	White Night	Korean	2017
"Wake Me Up" †	Kush, Joe Rhee #	White Night	Korean	2017
"Darling" †	Teddy #	White Night	Korean	2017
"Ride"	Taeyang, Joe Rhee, 24	White Night	Korean	2017
"Amazin'"	Taeyang, Joe Rhee, 24	White Night	Korean	2017
"Empty Road"	Kush, Taeyang, Joe Rhee	White Night	Korean	2017
"Naked"	Joe Rhee #	White Night	Korean	2017
"Tonight" (feat. Zico)	Kush, Taeyang, Zico	White Night	Korean	2017

=== Daesung ===
Song	Writer(s)	Originating album	Language	Year
"Try Smiling"	Ahn Young Min #	Bigbang Vol.1	Korean	2006
"Try Smiling"	Ahn Young Min #	D'slove	Japanese	2014
"Look at me, Gwisun" †	G-Dragon	—N/a	Korean	2008
"Look at me, Gwisun" †	G-Dragon, Kenichi Maeyamada	D'slove	Japanese	2014
"A Big Hit!" †	G-Dragon	—N/a	Korean	2008
"Baby Don't Cry"	e.knock #	Big Bang Special Edition	Korean	2011
"Baby Don't Cry"	Shoko Fujibayashi #	D'scover	Japanese	2013
"Wings" †	G-Dragon, Daesung	Alive	Korean	2012
"Wings" †	RJ Project #	D'scover	Japanese	2013
"Sunny Hill" (Note: Cover of Do As Infinity.)	Do As Infinity #	D'scover	Japanese	2013
"Love" (Note: Cover of Hata Motohiro.)	Hata Motohiro #	D'scover	Japanese	2013
"Singer's Ballad" (Note: Cover of Kazuyoshi Saito.)	Kazuyoshi Saito #	D'scover	Japanese	2013
"Powerful Boy" (Note: Cover of Sukima Switch.)	Ōhashi Takuya, Tokida Shintaro #	D'scover	Japanese	2013
"Hello" (Note: Cover of Ayaka.)	Ayaka #	D'scover	Japanese	2013
"Joyful" (Note: Cover of Ikimono-gakari.)	Mizuno Yoshiki #	D'scover	Japanese	2013
"Like Overflowing with Kindness" (Note: Cover of Juju.)	Ogura Shinko, Kameda Seiji #	D'scover	Japanese	2013
"Missing You Now" (Note: Cover of Misia.)	Misia #	D'scover	Japanese	2013
"The Flower Bud Of My Dream" (Note: Cover of Remioromen.)	Fujimaki Ryota #	D'scover	Japanese	2013
"Tonight is Boogie Back" (Note: Cover of Kenji Ozawa.)	K.Ozawa, M.Koshima, S.Matsumoto, Y.Matsumoto #	D'scover	Japanese	2013
"Rainy Rainy"	Daesung, Amon Hayashi	D'slove	Japanese	2014
"Feelings Deepened"	Daesung, Sung Hwak Cho, Shoko Fujibayashi	D'slove	Japanese	2014
"Shut Up"	G-Dragon, Kenn Kato	D'slove	Japanese	2014
"Two People? Alone"	Daesung, Kenn Kato	D'slove	Japanese	2014
"Dress"	Daesung, Amon Hayashi	D'slove	Japanese	2014
"Awake, Asleep"	Daesung, Kenn Kato	D'slove	Japanese	2014
"Even When the World Ends"	Daesung, RJ Project	D'slove	Japanese	2014
"I Love You" (feat. Taro Hakase) †	Yutaka Ozaki #	D'slove	Japanese	2014
"Old Diary" (Note: Cover of Akiko Wada.)	Yasui Kazumi #	Delight	Japanese	2014
"Just Can't Stop It" (Note: Cover of Linda Yamamoto.)	Yū Aku #	Delight	Japanese	2014
"D-Day" †	Hata Motohiro #	D-Day	Japanese	2017
"Intro (To You)"	Sung Hwak Cho, Kenn Kato #	D-Day	Japanese	2017
"Venus"	Mizuno Yoshiki #	D-Day	Japanese	2017
"The Sign"	Ayaka #	D-Day	Japanese	2017
"Spring Breeze Melody"	Daesung, Kameda Seiji, Kota76	D-Day	Japanese	2017
"Close Future"	Kameda Seiji #	D-Day	Japanese	2017
"Anymore"	Sung Hwak Cho, Yeon Jae Min #	D-Day	Japanese	2017
"Stay By My Side"	Kush, Daesung	Delight 2	Japanese	2017
"Dear Friends" (Note: Cover of Personz.)	Jill #	Delight 2	Japanese	2017
"A•Ze•Cho!"	Yoshiki Mizuno #	Delight 2	Japanese	2017
"No, It's Not Like That" (Note: Cover of Masayuki Suzuki.)	Kanata Asamizu #	Delight 2	Japanese	2017
"The Direction of My Smiling Face" (Note: Cover of Dreams Come True.)	Miwa Yoshida #	Delight 2	Japanese	2017
"Until the Day We Meet Again" (Note: Cover of Kiyohiko Ozaki.)	Kiyohiko Ozaki #	Delight 2	Japanese	2017
"It Hurts" (Note: Cover of 2ne1.)	e.knock, Sunwoo Jungah #	Delight 2	Korean	2017

=== T.O.P ===
Song	Writer(s)	Originating album	Language	Year
"Big Boy"	T.O.P	Bigbang Vol.1	Korean	2006
"Act Like Nothing's Wrong" (feat. Kim Ji Eun)	T.O.P	Always	Korean	2007
"Turn It Up" †	T.O.P	GD & TOP	Korean	2010
"Oh Mom"	T.O.P	GD & TOP	Korean	2010
"Of All Days"	T.O.P	GD & TOP	Korean	2010
"Doom Dada" †	T.O.P	—N/a	Korean	2013

== Sub-unit released songs ==
Song	Artist(s)	Writer(s)	Originating album	Language	Year
"Intro"	GD & TOP	G-Dragon, T.O.P	GD&TOP	Korean	2010
"High High" †	GD & TOP	G-Dragon, T.O.P, Teddy	GD&TOP	Korean	2010
"Oh Yeah" (feat. Park Bom) †	GD & TOP	G-Dragon, T.O.P, Teddy	GD&TOP	Korean	2010
"Don't Go Home" †	GD & TOP	G-Dragon	GD&TOP	Korean	2010
"Baby Good Night" †	GD & TOP	G-Dragon, T.O.P	GD&TOP	Korean	2010
"Knock Out" †	GD & TOP	G-Dragon, T.O.P	GD&TOP	Korean	2010
"Good Boy" †	GD X Taeyang	G-Dragon	—N/a	Korean	2014
"Zutter" †	GD & TOP	G-Dragon, Teddy, T.O.P	MADE	Korean	2015

== See also ==
- Big Bang discography
- List of awards and nominations received by Big Bang
