= The Best of Big Bang =

- Regular edition cover

Greatest hits album by Big Bang
- Released: December 14, 2011
- Recorded: 2006–2011
- Genre: K-pop; J-pop; dance-pop
- Length: 52:40
- Language: Korean; Japanese
- Label: Universal Music Japan

Big Bang chronology
The Ultimate (International Best) (2011)	The Best of Big Bang (2011)	Alive (EP) (2012)

The Best of Big Bang is the third greatest hits album by South Korean boy band Big Bang. The album was stated to release on November 23, 2011, but due to G-Dragon's scandal, it was postponed to December 14, 2011.

== Background ==
The Japanese Best album includes all singles released in Japan and songs from the albums Big Bang and Big Bang 2. It also includes a Japanese version of the song "Haru Haru". The Asia Best 2 2006–2011 album includes hits of the group during 2006 until 2011. It is the second part of the greatest hits Asia Best 2006–2009. The album was released in three different formats: a 2CD+DVD edition with a T-shirt, a 2CD+DVD edition only and a regular edition with the Japanese Best disc only.

== Chart performance ==
The album debuted at number 1 in Oricon's daily chart and number 2 in Weekly album chart with 30,043 copies sold.

== Track listing ==
CD 1: The Best of Big Bang – (Standard edition) and Japanese Best
No.	Title	From the album	Length
1.	"Haru Haru" (Japanese version)		4:17
2.	"Tonight" (Japanese version)	Big Bang 2	3:40
3.	"Hands Up"	Big Bang 2	3:59
4.	"Tell Me Goodbye"	Big Bang 2	4:06
5.	"Beautiful Hangover"	Big Bang 2	3:46
6.	"Top of the World"	Big Bang	3:01
7.	"Baby Baby" (Japanese version)	Big Bang	3:52
8.	"Always" (Japanese version)	Big Bang	3:55
9.	"Somebody to Luv"	Big Bang 2	3:33
10.	"Koe o Kikasete" (声をきかせて; Let Me Hear Your Voice)	Big Bang 2	4:15
11.	"Emotion"	Big Bang	3:19
12.	"Ms. Liar"	Big Bang 2	3:53
13.	"Gara Gara Go!!" (ガラガラ GO!!, Gotta Gotta Go!!)	Big Bang	3:19
14.	"My Heaven"	Big Bang	3:52
Total length:			52:40

CD 2: Asia Best 2 2006–2011
No.	Title	From the album	Length
1.	"A Fool of Tears" ((눈물뿐인 바보; Nunmulppunin Babo))	Big Bang (single album)	4:03
2.	"Forever with You" (featuring Park Bom)	Big Bang 03	3:39
3.	"Good Bye Baby"	Big Bang 03	3:31
4.	"Dirty Cash"	Bigbang Vol.1	3:14
5.	"Crazy Dog"	Hot Issue	3:40
6.	"A Good Man" ((착한 사람; Chaghan Salam))	Stand Up	3:23
7.	"Oh My Friend"	Stand Up	3:30
8.	"Sparking" ((반짝 반짝; Banjjak banjjak))	Remember	3:38
9.	"Haru Haru" (acoustic version) (하루하루; Day by Day)	Remember	4:26
10.	"Wonderful"	Remember	3:32
11.	"Lollipop Pt.2"	Non-album release	3:20
12.	"Love Song"	Tonight	3:47
13.	"Mad About You"	With U	3:46

CD+DVD Edition – DVD bonus tracks
No.	Title	Length
1.	"My Heaven" (music video and making of)
2.	"Gara Gara Go!!" (music video and making of)
3.	"Koe o Kikasete" (music video and making of)
4.	"Tell Me Goodbye" (music video and making of)
5.	"Beautiful Hangover" (music video)
6.	"Tonight" (music video – Japanese version)
7.	"Love Song" (music video)
8.	"Big Bang album making of"
9.	"Big Bang First Press Conference in Japan"
10.	"Gara Gara Go!!" (single release commemorative live digest)

== Charts ==
Chart performance for The Best of Big Bang
Chart (2011)	Peak position
Japanese Top Albums Sales (Billboard)	3
Japanese Daily Albums (Oricon)	1
Japanese Weekly Albums (Oricon)	2
Japanese Monthly Albums (Oricon)	18

== Sales ==
Sales for The Best of Big Bang
Chart	Amount
Oricon physical sales	51,000

== Release history ==
Release history and formats for The Best of Big Bang
Region	Date	Format	Label
Japan	December 14, 2011	CD; CD+DVD; digital download	Universal Music Japan
