= XX: Cosmos World Tour =

Concert tour by BigBang

- Tour by BigBang
- Location: Asia; Australia; Europe; North America
- Start date: August 21, 2026
- End date: February 28, 2027
- No. of shows: 41
- Website: XX: Cosmos World Tour

BigBang concert chronology
- Last Dance Tour (2017); XX: Cosmos World Tour (2026–2027)

The XX: Cosmos World Tour is the third major world concert tour by South Korean boy band BigBang and runs from 2026 to 2027. The tour marks the group's first concert series as a three-member lineup consisting of G-Dragon, Taeyang, and Daesung, and is their first concert tour since the Last Dance Tour concluded in 2017.

Coinciding with the 20th anniversary of the group's debut, the tour began on August 21, 2026, at Goyang Stadium in Goyang, South Korea. It will visit cities across Asia, North America, Europe, and Australia before concluding in Kaohsiung, Taiwan, on February 28, 2027.

== Background and promotion ==
After concluding their Last Dance Tour in December 2017, BigBang entered an extended hiatus while the members completed their mandatory military service. Promotion for the tour focused on BigBang's 20th anniversary and its first live performances as a three-member lineup. In April 2026, BigBang performed at the Coachella Valley Music and Arts Festival, presenting a set that included songs from throughout their career. Forbes described the performance as evidence that the group remained "unparalleled", while the Los Angeles Times noted the size of the audience and discussed the group's influence on K-pop. During the performance, G-Dragon announced that a world tour was being planned. On June 10, 2026, YG Entertainment and AEG Presents announced a 31-show itinerary.

== Ticketing and sales ==
Ticket sales for the XX: Cosmos World Tour were handled by several ticketing agencies, including Ticketmaster, AXS, and Coupang Play. Ticket sales were organized through several presale periods. Members of BigBang's V.I.P fan club on b.stage could register for presale access from June 16 to 21, with the membership presale beginning on June 24. Regional promoters, including AEG Presents in the United Kingdom and France, held additional presales on June 25 for concerts at venues including the Stade de France and Tottenham Hotspur Stadium.

Tickets for the tour's opening three concerts at Goyang Stadium, scheduled for August 21-23, 2026, went on sale to the general public through Coupang Play on June 25. All available seats sold out within 22 minutes. The platform recorded a peak of approximately 210,000 concurrent users and its highest single-day reservation traffic for a music or entertainment event in South Korea during the first half of 2026.

Tickets for most international dates went on sale to the general public on June 26 through distributors including AXS and Ticketmaster. Tickets for the North American opening concert at the Oakland Coliseum, scheduled for September 5, sold out within 30 minutes. Following the sellout, organizers reportedly considered adding further dates in response to demand.

== Setlist ==
This set list was taken from the August 21, 2026 show in Goyang, South Korea. It does not represent all shows throughout the tour.

1. "Fantastic Baby"
2. "Hands Up"
3. "Tonight"
4. "Blue"
5. "Loser"
6. "If You"
7. "Bad Boy"
8. "Bae Bae"
9. "Haru Haru"
10. "Lies"
11. "Universe" (Daesung solo)
12. "Wings" (Daesung solo)
13. "Hando Chogua" (Daesung solo)
14. "Look At Me, Gwisun" (Daesung solo)
15. "Bad" (Taeyang solo)
16. "Ringa Linga" (Taeyang solo)
17. "Live Fast Die Slow" (Taeyang solo)
18. "Power" (G-Dragon solo)
19. "Good Boy" (G-Dragon x Taeyang)
20. "Crayon" (G-Dragon solo)
21. "Crooked" (G-Dragon solo)
22. "Bang Bang Bang"
23. "Stupid Liar"
24. "Sober"
25. "We Like 2 Party"
26. "BiiiG"
27. "Home Sweet Home"

Encore

1. "My Heaven"
2. "Sunset Glow"
3. "Last Farewell"
4. "Feeling"
5. "Still Life"

== Tour dates ==
List of concert dates, showing date, city, country, venue, attendance and gross revenue
Date	City	Country	Venue	Attendance	Revenue
August 21, 2026	Goyang	South Korea	Goyang Stadium	110,000	$14,577,844
August 22, 2026	Goyang	South Korea	Goyang Stadium	110,000	$14,577,844
August 23, 2026	Goyang	South Korea	Goyang Stadium	110,000	$14,577,844
September 4, 2026	Oakland	United States	Oakland Coliseum	62,200	$15,200,000
September 5, 2026	Oakland	United States	Oakland Coliseum	62,200	$15,200,000
September 11, 2026	East Rutherford	United States	MetLife Stadium	50,600	$12,600,000
September 19, 2026	Saint-Denis (Note: Labelled as Paris in promotional material.)	France	Stade de France	44,000	$8,600,000
September 26, 2026	London	England	Tottenham Hotspur Stadium	41,300	$8,700,000
October 9, 2026	Taipei	Taiwan	Taipei Dome	120,000	—
October 10, 2026	Taipei	Taiwan	Taipei Dome	120,000	—
October 11, 2026	Taipei	Taiwan	Taipei Dome	120,000	—
October 17, 2026	Singapore		Singapore National Stadium	—	—
October 18, 2026	Singapore		Singapore National Stadium	—	—
October 24, 2026	Hanoi	Vietnam	Mỹ Đình National Stadium	90,000	-
October 25, 2026	Hanoi	Vietnam	Mỹ Đình National Stadium	90,000	-
October 31, 2026	Sydney	Australia	Accor Stadium	—	—
November 7, 2026	Bangkok	Thailand	Rajamangala Stadium	—	—
November 13, 2026	Hong Kong		Kai Tak Stadium	150,000	—
November 14, 2026	Hong Kong		Kai Tak Stadium	150,000	—
November 15, 2026	Hong Kong		Kai Tak Stadium	150,000	—
November 17, 2026	Hong Kong		Kai Tak Stadium	150,000	—
November 27, 2026	Osaka	Japan	Kyocera Dome Osaka	—	—
November 28, 2026	Osaka	Japan	Kyocera Dome Osaka	—	—
November 29, 2026	Osaka	Japan	Kyocera Dome Osaka	—	—
December 5, 2026	Nagoya	Japan	Vantelin Dome Nagoya	—	—
December 6, 2026	Nagoya	Japan	Vantelin Dome Nagoya	—	—
December 13, 2026	Tokyo	Japan	Tokyo Dome	—	—
December 14, 2026	Tokyo	Japan	Tokyo Dome	—	—
December 15, 2026	Tokyo	Japan	Tokyo Dome	—	—
December 26, 2026	Fukuoka	Japan	Mizuho PayPay Dome Fukuoka	—	—
December 27, 2026	Fukuoka	Japan	Mizuho PayPay Dome Fukuoka	—	—
January 9, 2027	Kuala Lumpur	Malaysia	TM Stadium Nasional	—	—
January 10, 2027	Kuala Lumpur	Malaysia	TM Stadium Nasional	—	—
January 16, 2027	Jakarta	Indonesia	Jakarta International Stadium	—	—
January 17, 2027	Jakarta	Indonesia	Jakarta International Stadium	—	—
February 20, 2027	Parañaque (Note: Labelled as Manila in promotional material.)	Philippines	SMDC Festival Grounds	—	—
February 26, 2027	Kaohsiung	Taiwan	Kaohsiung National Stadium	—	—
February 27, 2027	Kaohsiung	Taiwan	Kaohsiung National Stadium	—	—
February 28, 2027	Kaohsiung	Taiwan	Kaohsiung National Stadium	—	—
March 13, 2027	Los Angeles	United States	SoFi Stadium	—	—
Total					

=== Cancelled shows ===
List of cancelled concert dates, showing date, city, country, venue, and reason for cancellation
Date	City	Country	Venue	Reason	Ref
November 8, 2026	Bangkok	Thailand	Rajamangala Stadium	Severe weather conditions (heavy rain)	

== Personnel ==
BigBang

- G-Dragon – vocals, rap, dance
- Taeyang – vocals, dance
- Daesung – vocals

== Notes ==
Cities
