= Last Farewell =

Last Farewell may refer to:

- "Last Farewell", a song by the American folk band The New Christy Minstrels, from their 1963 album Ramblin
- "Last Farewell", a song by the British psychedelic rock band Kula Shaker, from their 1999 album Peasants, Pigs & Astronauts
- "Last Farewell", a song by the South Korean pop band Big Bang, from their 2007 extended play Hot Issue
- "The Last Farewell", a hit song by the British-Kenyan folk singer Roger Whittaker, from multiple album releases
- Last farewell USSR (Прощай, СССР), a 1991 film by Alexander Rodnyansky
- Little House: The Last Farewell, a 1984 made-for-TV movie that aired after the original run of the drama series Little House on the Prairie
- "Mi último adiós" (Spanish for "My last farewell"), an 1896 poem by the Filipino nationalist Jose Rizal
