= Second Live Concert: The Great =

Live album by BigBang
- Released: February 27, 2008
- Recorded: December 28–30, 2007
- Genre: K-pop; Hip hop; R&B
- Length: 68:57
- Language: Korean
- Label: YG

BigBang chronology
For the World (2008)	Second Live Concert: The Great (2008)	With U (2008)

Second Live Concert: The Great is the second live album of South Korean boy band BigBang, released by YG Entertainment on February 27, 2008. This album was recorded during BigBang's tour The G.R.E.A.T which was held at the Seoul Olympic Park in South Korea, from December 28 to 30, 2007.

== Track listing ==
No.	Title	Length
1.	"Crazy Dog + You In the Fantasy" (환상 속의 그대; Huansang Sogae Goodae)	4:18
2.	"Shake It" (흔들어)	4:00
3.	"Wild Wild West"	3:25
4.	"Try Smiling" (웃어본다 Daesung solo)	4:37
5.	"Next Day" (다음날 Seungri solo)	4:33
6.	"Ma Girl" (Taeyang solo)	4:31
7.	"La La La"	2:59
8.	"Fool" (바보; Babo)	4:23
9.	"This Love" (G-Dragon solo)	4:51
10.	"Lies" (거짓말; Geojitmal)	4:03
11.	"Act Like Nothing's Wrong" (아무렇지 않은 척; Amureochi Anheun Cheok) (T.O.P solo)	5:06
12.	"A Fool's Only Tears" (눈물뿐인 바보)	4:46
13.	"But I Love U" (G-Dragon solo)	4:40
14.	"Last Farewell" (마지막 인사; Majimak Insa)	4:05
15.	"Always" (Encore)	3:49
16.	"Lies" (Encore)	4:43
Total length:		68:57

Notes

- "Crazy Dog + You, in the Fantasy" is a medley that it includes BigBang's "Crazy Dog" and Seo Taiji & Boys' "You, in the Fantasy".
- "Wild Wild West" is a mixed cover as it contains BigBang's "How Gee" lyrics and Will Smith's "Wild Wild West" music and lyrics.

== Charts ==
Release	Hanteo Albums Chart	Peak position	Sales
February 27, 2008
February 27, 2008	Hanteo Monthly Albums Chart	3	7,249
February 27, 2008	Hanteo Yearly Albums Chart	45	27,567
