= Remember (BigBang album) =

2008 studio album by Big Bang

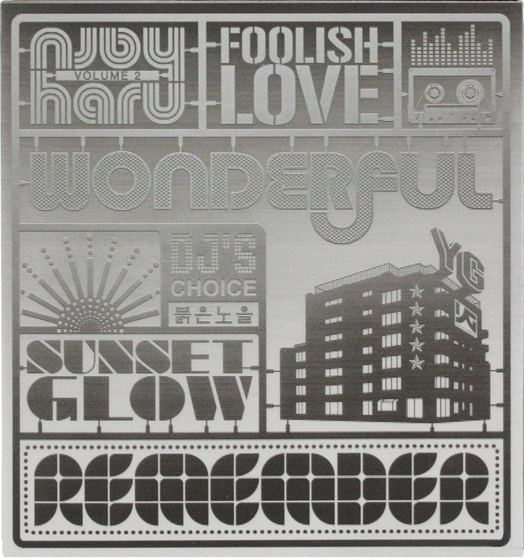

Studio album by BigBang
- Released: November 5, 2008
- Recorded: 2008
- Genre: K-pop; hip pop; R&B; dance-pop; electropop
- Length: 39:12
- Language: Korean
- Label: YG
- Producer: Big Bang; Teddy Park; Kush

BigBang chronology
Number 1 (2008)	Remember (2008)	Big Bang (2009)

Singles from Remember
- 1. "Sunset Glow" Released: November 5, 2008; 2. "Strong Baby" Released: January 1, 2009

Remember is the second Korean studio album by South Korean boy band BigBang, released by YG Entertainment on November 5, 2008. Before release, demand for the album made it surpass 200,000 pre-orders. "Sunset Glow", originally by artist Lee Moon-sae, served as the title track for the album. During the 2008 KBS Music Festival, BigBang performed the hit together with Lee Moon-sae.

"Strong Baby", Seungri's solo track, was released as the second single. The music video was released January 1, 2009. At the 18th Seoul Music Awards a month later, the album received the Best Album Award.

== Promotion ==
Two music videos from the album were released for "Sunset Glow" and "Strong Baby." "Sunset Glow" was promoted with the entire group, while member Seungri performed "Strong Baby" solo.

The music video for "Sunset Glow" was filmed at various locations in Taean County, along the west coast, with the BigBang members spreading the message "Let's go West!" throughout the video. At the time, the Taean region was recovering from the ecological and economic effects the 2007 South Korea oil spill had on what used to be an abundant fishing industry and scenic beach tourism destination. When asked why Taean was chosen as the background of the music video, Big Bang said, "We hope many people will visit the west coast again after watching our music video."

== Commercial performance ==
On the year-end Hanteo albums charts for 2008, Remember was ranked as the 4th best-selling album in South Korea with sales of cover 135,000 copies on the chart. In April 2010, the album along with several of BigBang's other releases re-charted on the Gaon Album Chart, with Remember peaking at number 5 on the weekly chart and number 19 on the monthly issue.

== Accolades ==
Awards and nominations
Ceremony	Year	Category	Result	Ref.
Golden Disc Awards	2008	Album Bonsang (Main Prize)	Nominated	
Seoul Music Awards	2009	Best Album	Won	

== Track listing ==
No.	Title	Lyrics	Music	Arrangement	Length
1.	"Intro (Everybody Scream)" (모두 다 소리쳐; Modu da sorichyeo)	G-Dragon	G-Dragon, Kush	Kush, DJ Wreckx	1:44
2.	"Oh. Ah. Oh." (오. 아. 오.)	G-Dragon	G-Dragon, John Larkin, Antonio Nunzio Catania, Teddy	Teddy	3:46
3.	"Sunset Glow" (붉은 노을; Byulkeun noeul)	G-Dragon, Lee Hyung-hon	Lee Hyung-hon, G-Dragon, Teddy	Teddy	3:24
4.	"Twinkle Twinkle" (반짝 반짝; Banjjak banjjak)	Kush	Kush	Kush	3:38
5.	"Strong Baby" (Seungri solo)	G-Dragon	G-Dragon, JR Groove	JR Groove	3:43
6.	"Wonderful"	G-Dragon	G-Dragon, Brave Brothers, Teddy	Teddy	3:28
7.	"Foolish Love" (멍청한 사랑; Meongcheonghan sarang)	G-Dragon	Kush, Choi Kyusung	Kush	4:02
8.	"Haru Haru (Acoustic Version)" (하루하루; Haru haru)	G-Dragon	G-Dragon, Daishi Dance	Kush	4:41
9.	"Lies (Remix)" (거짓말; Geojitmal)	G-Dragon	G-Dragon	G-Dragon	3:28
10.	"Last Farewell (Remix)" (마지막 인사; Majimak insa)	G-Dragon	G-Dragon, Brave Brothers	Kush	4:02
11.	"Remember" (Korean Version)	Yang Hyun-suk	Teddy, Walt Anderson	Teddy	3:19
Total length:					39:12

Sample credits

- "Oh. Ah. Oh." contains samples from Scatman (Ski-Ba-Bop-Ba-Dop-Bop) by Scatman John
- "Sunset Glow" contains samples from "Sunset Glow" by Lee Moon-se

== Charts ==
=== Weekly charts ===
Chart (2010)	Peak position
South Korean Albums (Gaon)	5

=== Monthly charts ===
Chart (April 2010)	Peak position
South Korean Albums (Gaon)	19
