= With U (BigBang EP) =

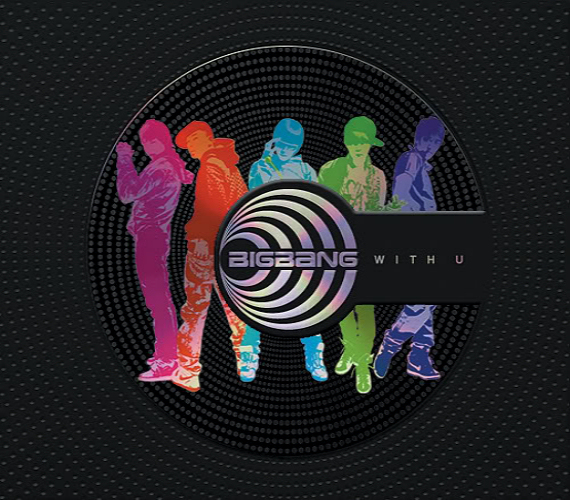

EP by BigBang
- Released: May 28, 2008
- Genre: K-pop; R&B; hip hop
- Length: 26:55
- Language: English; Japanese
- Label: YG; Village Again
- Producer: Yang Hyun-suk (exec.); G-Dragon; Perry

BigBang chronology
| Second Live Concert: The Great (2008) | With U (2008) | Stand Up (2008) |

Singles from With U
- 1. "With U" Released: May 28, 2008

With U is the second Japanese extended play by South Korean boy band BigBang. It was released on May 28, 2008.

== Background ==
After experiencing breakthrough success in their home country with the song "Lies" and "Last Farewell", BigBang expanded their endeavors to Japan, hoping to produce similar results. In 2009, American music publishing company Sony/ATV Music Publishing accused YG Entertainment of plagiarism, and listed four songs recorded by several of YG's artists as having been plagiarized. BigBang's single "With U" was included as part of the accusation and deemed to have copied from R&B singer Joe's 2004 single "Ride wit U", with Sony stating they would take legal action. YG Entertainment denied all accusations.

== Track listing ==
With U track listing
| No. | Title | Length |
|---|---|---|
| 1. | "Intro – Gotta Be With U" | 1:08 |
| 2. | "With U" (English version) | 3:01 |
| 3. | "Baby Baby" (마지막 인사, Majimak Insa) (English version of "Last Farewell") | 3:53 |
| 4. | "This Love" (English version) (G-Dragon solo) | 3:30 |
| 5. | "Mad About You" (바보, Babo) (Japanese version of "Fool") | 3:46 |
| 6. | "We Belong Together" (English version) (featuring Park Bom of 2NE1) | 3:59 |
| 7. | "Shake It" (흔들어, Heundeureo) (English version of "Shake It"; featuring Lee Eun-ju of Moo Ga Dang) | 3:45 |
| 8. | "My Girl" (Japanese version of "Ma Girl") (Taeyang solo) | 3:49 |
| Total length: | | 26:55 |
