= First Live Concert: The Real =

Live album by Big Bang
- Released: February 8, 2007
- Recorded: December 30, 2006
- Genre: K-pop; Hip hop; R&B
- Length: 61:38
- Language: Korean
- Label: YG

Big Bang chronology
Bigbang Vol.1– Since 2007 (2006)	First Live Concert: The Real (2007)	Always (2007)

First Live Concert: The Real is the first live album of South Korean boy band Big Bang, released by YG Entertainment on February 8, 2007. The album was recorded during their debut concert on December 30, 2006, at the Olympic Gymnastics Arena in Seoul, in support of the group's first Korean studio album, Bigbang Vol.1.

== Track listing ==
No.	Title	Length
1.	"BIGBANG"	3:27
2.	"V.I.P"	3:16
3.	"Ma Girl" (Taeyang solo)	4:03
4.	"A Fool's Only Tears" (눈물뿐인 바보)	4:03
5.	"We Belong Together"	3:59
6.	"Forever With You"	3:33
7.	"Try Smiling" (웃어본다) (Daesung solo)	4:14
8.	"Big Boy" (T.O.P solo)	3:46
9.	"Next Day" (다음날) (Seungri solo)	4:00
10.	"She Can`t Get Enough"	3:31
11.	"Dirty Cash"	3:20
12.	"This Love" (G-Dragon solo)	4:17
13.	"La La La"	3:29
14.	"Good Bye Baby"	5:20
15.	"Shake It" (흔들어)	4:03
16.	"Dirty Cash (For Fan - Original Track)"	3:11
Total length:		61:38

== Charts ==
Release	Chart	Peak position	Debut sales	Sales total
February 8, 2007	Miak Monthly album chart	4	23,638	-
February 8, 2007	Miak Year-end album chart	61	15,211	38,849
