= Number 1 (BigBang album) =

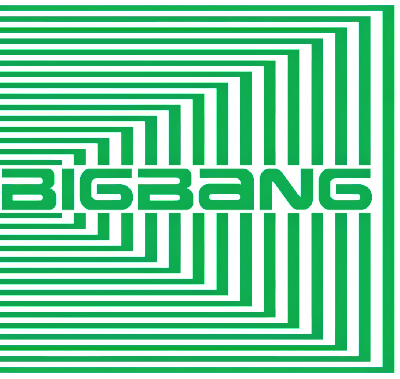

Studio album by BigBang
- Released: October 9, 2008
- Recorded: 2008
- Genre: Hip hop; hip pop; R&B
- Length: 45:35
- Language: English; Korean; Japanese
- Label: YG; Universal Music Japan
- Producer: Yang Hyun-suk (exec.); G-Dragon; Perry

BigBang chronology
Stand Up (2008)	Number 1 (2008)	Remember (2008)

Singles from Number 1
- 1. "Number 1" Released: October 9, 2008

Alternative album cover

Number 1 is the first Japanese album by South Korean boy band BigBang, released by YG Entertainment and Universal Music Japan in Japan. Some of the songs were written and composed by the members themselves, most notably G-Dragon. The album includes the group's first two mini-albums in Japan and songs from their third mini-album in South Korea. Noticeably, this album is primarily in English and includes versions of songs previously released in Korean.

== Track listing ==
Number 1 – Standard edition
No.	Title	Lyrics	Music	Arrangement	Length
1.	"Intro"				1:12
2.	"Number 1"	Jimmy Thornfeldt, Martin Hansen, Mohombi Moupondo	Jimmy Thornfeldt, Martin Hansen, Mohombi Moupondo	Jimmy Thornfeldt, Martin Hansen, Mohombi Moupondo	3:17
3.	"Make Love" (English Version)	Kush, Daniel Im, Steve-I	Kush, Daniel Im, Steve-I	Kush	3:37
4.	"Come Be My Lady"	Jimmy Thornfeldt, Martin Hansen, Mohombi Moupondo	Jimmy Thornfeldt, Martin Hansen, Mohombi Moupondo	Jimmy Thornfeldt, Martin Hansen, Mohombi Moupondo, Perry	2:53
5.	"Haru Haru"	G-Dragon	G-Dragon, Daishi Dance	Daishi Dance	4:16
6.	"With U"	G-Dragon, Perry	G-Dragon, Teddy, Perry	Perry, Teddy, G-Dragon	3:01
7.	"How Gee"	Big Bang, Perry	Big Bang, Perry	Brave Brothers	3:15
8.	"Baby Baby" (Last Farewell, English Version)	Perry, Emi K.Lynn	G-Dragon, Brave Brothers	Brave Brothers	3:54
9.	"So Beautiful"	Big Bang, Perry	Perry, Brave Brothers	Brave Brothers	3:38
10.	"Remember"	Yang Hyun Suk, G-Dragon, T.O.P	Teddy, Walt Anderson	Teddy	3:20
11.	"Heaven"	G-Dragon	G-Dragon, Daishi Dance	G-Dragon, Daishi Dance	3:53
12.	"Everything"	Perry	Perry	Perry	3:55
13.	"Always" (English Version)	Big Bang, Perry	Teddy, Perry	Teddy	3:55
14.	"Candle (Together Forever)" (A Fool of Tears, Japanese Version, first press edition only)	Perry, Big Bang, Komu	Jeon Seung Woo	Jeon Seung Woo	4:02
Total length:					48:15

CD+DVD Edition – DVD bonus tracks
No.	Title	Length
1.	"Haru Haru PV" (Music Video with Subtitles)
2.	"With U PV" (Music Video)
3.	"With U PV" (Making)
