= My Heaven =

Single by BigBang

from the album Big Bang
- Language: Japanese
- B-side: "Emotion"
- Released: June 24, 2009
- Genre: J-Pop
- Length: 3:51
- Label: YG; Universal Music Japan
- Songwriters: G-Dragon; Shoko Fujibayashi; Komu; Rina Moon
- Producers: Daishi Dance; Jimmy Thornfeld; Mohombi; Perry

BigBang singles chronology
"Strong Baby" (2009)	"My Heaven" (2009)	"Gara Gara Go!" (2009)

Music video
- "My Heaven" on YouTube

"My Heaven" Japanese: 天国, Romanization: Tengoku is the first Japanese single by South Korean boy band, Big Bang released under YG Entertainment and Universal Music Japan. The single is a Japanese version of the group's previous song "천국" ("Heaven") from their extended play, Stand Up (2008).

My Heaven's music video started filming from 27 to 28 April 2009 and premiered May 11, 2009. The music video is about the break-up between G-Dragon and his girlfriend. The girl featured in the music video is the Japanese actress and model Mayuko Kawakita.

== Track listing ==
My Heaven – CD+DVD edition and CD Type A
No.	Title	Length
1.	"My Heaven" (天国; Tengoku)	3:51
2.	"Emotion" (エモーション; Emōshon)	3:19
3.	"My Heaven" (Club mix)	4:34
Total length:		11:43

My Heaven – CD Type B edition
No.	Title	Length
1.	"My Heaven" (天国; Tengoku)	3:51
2.	"Emotion" (エモーション; Emōshon)	3:19
3.	"Candle" (Michitomo remix)	6:07
Total length:		11:47

CD+DVD Edition – DVD bonus tracks
No.	Title	Length
1.	"My Heaven" (天国; Tengoku; Music Video)
2.	"My Heaven" (天国; Tengoku; Music Video - Making Of)

== Release history ==
Region	Date	Format	Label
Japan	June 24, 2009	CD single; digital download	YG; Universal Music Japan
Japan	June 24, 2009	CD single + DVD	YG; Universal Music Japan
Taiwan	June 26, 2009	CD single + DVD	Universal Music Taiwan
