= For the World =

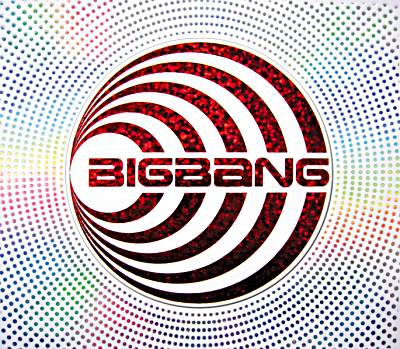

EP by BigBang
- Released: January 4, 2008
- Recorded: 2006–2007
- Genre: K-pop; hip hop; R&B
- Language: English
- Label: YG; Village Again
- Producer: Yang Hyun-suk (exec.); G-Dragon; Perry

BigBang chronology
Hot Issue (2007)	For the World (2008)	Second Live Concert: The Great (2008)

Singles from For the World
- 1. "How Gee" Released: January 4, 2008

For the World is the first Japanese extended play by Korean hip hop group BigBang. The EP contains eight English songs with hip hop, dance, and soul elements, co-composed and written by band member G-Dragon. For the World reached number 53 on the weekly Oricon Albums Chart, and as high as 13 on the daily chart.

== Track listing ==
No.	Title	Lyrics	Music	Arrangement	Length
1.	"VIP – Intro"	BigBang	G-Dragon, Kim Do Hyun	Kim Do Hyun	0:40
2.	"BigBang" (English version)	Perry, G-Dragon	Perry	Perry	3:25
3.	"How Gee"	Big Bang, Perry	Big Bang, Perry	Brave Brothers	3:15
4.	"Lies" (Korean/English version)	Perry, G-Dragon	G-Dragon	Brave Brothers	3:48
5.	"So Beautiful"	Perry, Big Bang	Perry, Brave Brothers	Brave Brothers	3:39
6.	"La La La" (English version)	Perry, Big Bang	Perry	Perry	3:00
7.	"Together Forever" (A Fool of Tears, English version)	Perry, Big Bang	Jeon Seung Woo	Jeon Seung Woo	4:02
8.	"Always" (English version)	Perry, Big Bang	Teddy Park, Perry	Perry	3:53

== Charts ==
Chart (2008)	Peak position
Japan Oricon Daily album chart	13
Japan Oricon Weekly album chart	53
