= Lollipop Pt. 2 =

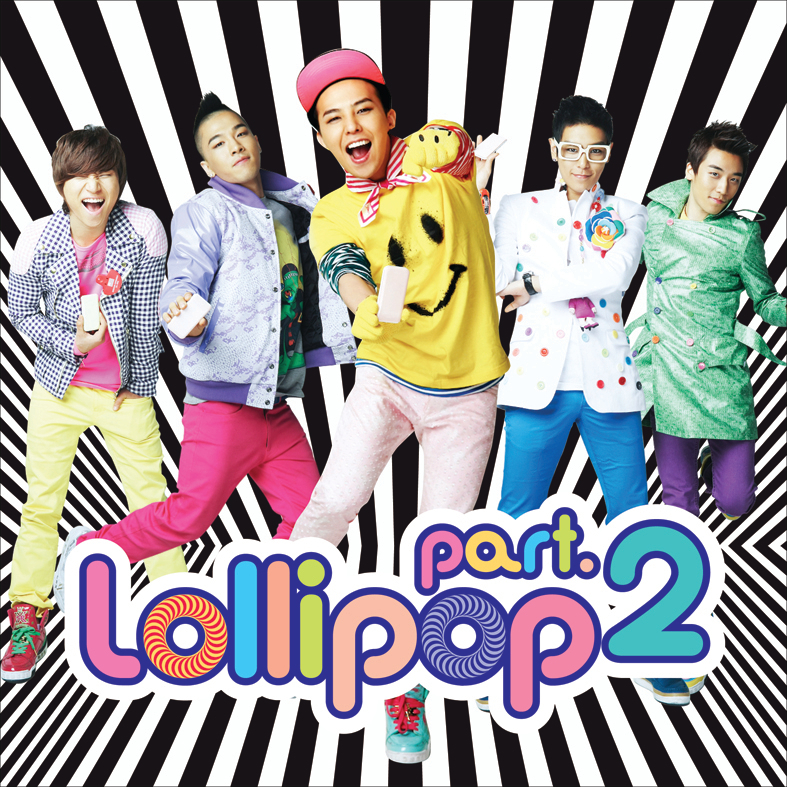

Promotional single by Big Bang
- Released: February 19, 2010
- Genre: Electro hop
- Length: 3:23
- Label: YG Entertainment
- Songwriters: Teddy; G-Dragon; T.O.P
- Producer: Teddy

"Lollipop Pt. 2" is a song recorded by South Korean group Big Bang for to promote a cellphone by LG Cyon. The recording also was released as their sixth digital single on February 19, 2010, by YG Entertainment. It was produced by Teddy and co-written with G-Dragon and T.O.P. The song peaked at number three on the Gaon Digital Chart, with 1,337,098 copies sold in the year of 2010.

== Background ==
BigBang collaborated with their labelmate 2NE1 a year before, in the release of the promotional single "Lollipop", released on March 27, 2009, and created to promote a cellphone by LG Cyon. In February, 2010 it was announced that BigBang would collaborate with LG Cyon Electronics again, this time only the group and returning with a digital single entitled "Lollipop 2", with date scheduled for the beginning of the month.

== Track listing ==
No.	Title	Lyrics	Music	Arrangement	Length
1.	"Lollipop Pt. 2"	Teddy, G-Dragon, T.O.P	Teddy	Teddy	3:23

== Charts ==
Chart (2010)	Peak position
South Korea (Gaon Chart)	3

=== Sales ===
Chart	Sales
South Korea (Gaon Chart)	1,337,098
