= Big Bang (BigBang album) =

Studio album by BigBang
- Released: August 19, 2009
- Recorded: 2009
- Genres: R&B; hip hop; dance-pop; electropop
- Length: 36:26
- Languages: Japanese; English
- Label: Universal J
- Producers: Yang Hyun-suk (exec.); Masahiro Kasumoto (exec.); Jimmy Thornfeldt; G-Dragon

BigBang chronology
Remember (2008)	Big Bang (2009)	Tonight (2011)

Singles from Big Bang
- 1. "My Heaven" Released: June 24, 2009; 2. "Gotta Gotta Go!! (ゴッタゴッタゴー!!; Gotta Gotta Gō!!)" Released: July 8, 2009; 3. "Bringing You Love" Released: August 19, 2009

Big Bang (also known as 1st Japanese Album) is the second Japanese studio album by South Korean boy band BigBang, and was released on August 19, 2009.

== Production ==
Production of the album started from the release of the group's first Japanese single, "My Heaven", in June 2009. The song enjoyed mild success; afterwards, the group's second single was released, "Gotta Gotta Go!!" and approximately a month later, the single had sold over 30,000 copies. BigBang finished recording the album by the end of July. The song "Love Club" is the only track sung entirely in English.

== Commercial performance ==
Big Bang debuted on the daily Oricon charts at number 2 with over 12,000 copies being sold on the first day. The album went on to chart at number 3 on the weekly Oricon charts.

== Track listing ==
Big Bang – Standard edition
No.	Title	Lyrics	Music	Arrangement	Length
1.	"Intro"				0:53
2.	"Gotta Gotta Go!!" (ゴッタゴッタゴー!!; Gotta Gotta Gō!!)	Big-Ron, Shion, Ricci, Yug Japan	Jimmy Thornfeldt	Jimmy Thornfeldt, Mohombi Moupondo, G-Dragon	3:18
3.	"Bringing You Love"	G-Dragon	Jimmy Thornfeldt	Jimmy Thornfeldt	3:24
4.	"My Heaven" (天国; Tengoku)	G-Dragon, Shoko Fujibayashi, Komu	G-Dragon, Daishi Dance	G-Dragon, Daishi Dance	3:52
5.	"Stay"	Shoko Fujibayashi	Jimmy Thornfeldt, Mohombi Moupondo	Jimmy Thornfeldt, Mohombi Moupondo	3:40
6.	"Top of the World"	Shikata	Jimmy Thornfeldt, Mohombi Moupondo	Jimmy Thornfeldt, Mohombi Moupondo	3:00
7.	"Follow Me"	Steve I	Jimmy Thornfeldt, Mohombi Moupondo	Jimmy Thornfeldt, Mohombi Moupondo	3:32
8.	"Baby Baby" (Japanese)	Emi K.Lynn	G-Dragon, Brave Brothers	Brave Brothers	3:53
9.	"Emotion" (エモーション; Emōshon)	G-Dragon, Komu	Jimmy Thornfeldt, Mohombi Moupondo, Perry	Jimmy Thornfeldt, Mohombi Moupondo, Perry	3:19
10.	"Love Club"	Rina Moon	G-Dragon, Perry, Teddy	Teddy	3:34
11.	"Always" (Japanese Version)	Rina Moon	Teddy, Perry	Teddy	3:54
Total length:					36:26

CD+DVD Edition – DVD bonus tracks
No.	Title	Length
1.	"My Heaven" (Music Video)
2.	"Gotta Gotta Go!! (ガラガラ ゴー!!; Gara Gara Gō!!)" (Music Video)
3.	"Album making"

Big Bang + Live Tracks – Repackage (bonus tracks)
No.	Title	Length
1.	"Gotta Gotta Go!! (ガラガラ ゴー!!; Gara Gara Gō!!)" (Live at Electric Love Tour 2010)
2.	"Top of the World" (Live at Electric Love Tour 2010)
3.	"Follow Me" (Live at Electric Love Tour 2010)
4.	"My Heaven" (Live at Electric Love Tour 2010)

== Sales and certifications ==
Region	Certification	Certified units/sales
Japan (RIAJ)	Gold	67,285

== Release history ==
Region	Date	Edition	Format	Label
Japan	August 19, 2009	Big Bang	CD, digital download	Universal Music Japan
Japan	August 19, 2009	Big Bang	CD+DVD (limited edition)	Universal Music Japan
Taiwan	August 28, 2009	Big Bang	CD+DVD	Universal Music Taiwan
Japan	March 31, 2010	Big Bang + Live Tracks	Double Album	Universal Music Japan
