= Made Series =

2016 Japanese-language album by South Korean band BigBang

- Box set, CD+DVD, digital, play button and standard edition cover

Studio album by Big Bang
- Released: February 3, 2016
- Studio: YG (Seoul)
- Genres: Dance-pop; hip hop; PBR&B
- Length: 40:33
- Languages: Japanese; Korean
- Label: YGEX
- Producers: G-Dragon; Teddy

Big Bang chronology
| E (2015) | Made Series (2016) | Made (2016) |

Alternative cover
- CD+Blu-ray and limited edition cover

Made Series (stylized in all caps) is the fifth Japanese-language studio album by South Korean boy band Big Bang. The album was released in Japan through YGEX on February 3, 2016. The eleven tracks includes Japanese versions of three of the group's Korean hits and the original eight songs from 4 single albums released in 2015.

== Release ==
The album was released in seven different editions, including CD, Blu-ray, Photo book, music videos, dance videos, making of mv and live performance a-nation Stadium Festival 2015. On January 6, 2016, the Japanese music video of "Loser" and "Bang Bang Bang" were released on their official channel on YouTube.

== Reception and chart performance ==
The album sold 80,262 copies on the first day and charted at number one on Oricon daily album chart, then in the first week the album sold 128,000 copies, breaking their own record of first-week sales which held by their previous album The Best of Big Bang 2006-2014 in 2014.

The album was chosen as one of the best Japanese albums in 2016 by KKBox, while the Japanese version of "Bang Bang Bang" ranked 1st place on the top 10 track in Japan, and praising the song as energetic, and calling it a classical song from the band.

The album won three awards in 31st Japan Gold Disc Award, best 3 albums in Asia, and the Japanese version of "Bang Bang Bang" won song of the year by download.

== Track listing ==
Disc 1: Made Series – Standard and Digital edition
| No. | Title | Lyrics | Music | Arrangement | Length |
|---|---|---|---|---|---|
| 1. | "Loser" (Japanese version) | Teddy, T.O.P, G-Dragon, Sunny Boy | Teddy, Taeyang | Teddy | 3:41 |
| 2. | "Bang Bang Bang" (Japanese version) | Teddy, G-Dragon, T.O.P, Verbal | Teddy, G-Dragon | Teddy | 3:42 |
| 3. | "If You" (Japanese version) | G-Dragon, Shoko Fujibayashi | G-Dragon, P.K, Dee.P | P.K, Dee.P | 4:27 |
| 4. | "Loser" (Korean version) | Teddy, G-Dragon, T.O.P | Teddy, Taeyang | Teddy | 3:40 |
| 5. | "Bae Bae" (Korean version) | Teddy, G-Dragon, T.O.P | Teddy, G-Dragon, T.O.P | Teddy | 2:50 |
| 6. | "Bang Bang Bang" (Korean version) | Teddy, G-Dragon, T.O.P | Teddy, G-Dragon | Teddy | 3:41 |
| 7. | "We Like 2 Party" (Korean version) | Teddy, Kush, G-Dragon, T.O.P | Teddy, Kush, Seo Won-jin, G-Dragon | Teddy, Kush | 3:16 |
| 8. | "If You" (Korean version) | G-Dragon | G-Dragon, P.K, Dee.P | P.K, Dee.P | 4:25 |
| 9. | "Sober" (Korean version) | Teddy, G-Dragon, T.O.P | Teddy, Choice37, G-Dragon | Teddy, Choice37 | 3:58 |
| 10. | "Let's Not Fall in Love" (Korean version) | Teddy, G-Dragon | Teddy, G-Dragon | Teddy | 3:32 |
| 11. | "Zutter (GD & T.O.P)" (Korean version) | Teddy, G-Dragon, T.O.P | Teddy, G-Dragon, T.O.P | Teddy | 3:17 |
| Total length: | | | | | 40:33 |

Disc 2: CD+DVD Edition and CD+Blu-ray Edition – DVD and Blu-ray bonus tracks
| No. | Title | Length |
|---|---|---|
| 1. | "Loser" (Music video Japanese version) |
| 2. | "Bang Bang Bang" (Music video Japanese version) |
| 3. | "Loser" (Music video Korean version) |
| 4. | "Bae Bae" (Music video Korean version) |
| 5. | "Bang Bang Bang" (Music video Korean version) |
| 6. | "We Like 2 Party" (Music video Korean version) |
| 7. | "Sober" (Music video Korean version) |
| 8. | "Zutter" (Music video Korean version) |
| 9. | "Let’s Not Fall in Love" (Music video Korean version) |
| 10. | "Bang Bang Bang" (Live performance a-nation Stadium Festival 2015) |
| 11. | "Tonight" (Live performance a-nation Stadium Festival 2015) |
| 12. | "Hands Up" (Live performance a-nation Stadium Festival 2015) |
| 13. | "Loser" (Live performance a-nation Stadium Festival 2015) |
| 14. | "Bad Boy" (Live performance a-nation Stadium Festival 2015) |
| 15. | "We Like 2 Party" (Live performance a-nation Stadium Festival 2015) |
| 16. | "Bae Bae" (Live performance a-nation Stadium Festival 2015) |
| 17. | "Fantastic Baby" (Live performance a-nation Stadium Festival 2015) |
| 18. | "Koe o Kikasete" (Live performance a-nation Stadium Festival 2015) |
| 19. | "My Heaven" (Live performance a-nation Stadium Festival 2015) |
| 20. | "Feeling" (Live performance a-nation Stadium Festival 2015) |
| 21. | "Sober" (Live performance a-nation Stadium Festival 2015) |

== Charts ==
=== Weekly charts ===
Weekly chart performance for Made Series
| Chart (2016) | Peak position |
|---|---|
| Japanese Albums (Oricon) | 1 |
| Japanese Hot Albums (Billboard) | 1 |
| Japanese Top Albums Sales (Billboard) | 1 |

=== Year-end charts ===
Year-end chart performance for Made Series
| Chart (2016) | Position |
|---|---|
| Japanese Albums (Oricon) | 20 |
| Japanese Hot Albums (Billboard) | 24 |
| Japanese Top Albums Sales (Billboard) | 23 |

== Release history ==
Release history and formats for Made Series
| Region | Date | Format | Label |
|---|---|---|---|
| Japan | February 3, 2016 | CD; DVD; blu-ray; playbutton | YGEX |
| Various | February 3, 2016 | Digital download; streaming | YGEX |
