= Last Farewell (BigBang song) =

Single by BigBang

from the album Hot Issue
- Released: November 22, 2007
- Recorded: 2007
- Studio: YG (Seoul)
- Genre: K-pop; hip hop; trance
- Length: 3:52
- Label: YG
- Songwriters: G-Dragon; Brave Brothers
- Producers: G-Dragon; Brave Brothers

BigBang singles chronology
| "Always" (2007) | "Last Farewell" (2007) | "How Gee" (2008) |

Music video
- "Last Farewell" on YouTube

"Last Farewell" (Korean: 마지막 인사; RR: Majimak insa) is a song by South Korean boy band BigBang. It was released through YG Entertainment on November 22, 2007 as the lead single from the quintet's second extended play Hot Issue. The song was written by G-Dragon and composed by the member and Brave Brothers. Mirroring the success of the group's preceding single "Lies," the song went on to become a chart topper. An English version of the song titled "Baby Baby" was included in the quintet's first and second Japanese albums Number 1 and Big Bang, as well in their greatest hits album The Best of Big Bang 2006–2014.

== Background and composition ==
With the release of their first extended play, Always in 2007, BigBang began to experiment more with their sound, moving away from their original hip hop roots, and experimenting with electronic music and dance music. Their second EP, Hot Issue, released that same year, built on that its predecessor's momentum. "Last Farewell," the lead single, was described by Billboard as one of the most blatant pop songs in the group's repertoire, with a "trance-tinged hip pop" sound. KpopStarz noted that the single included "some of the clubbiest sounds seen from Big Bang up until this point". An English version of the song named "Baby Baby" was included in the quintet's first and second Japanese albums Number 1 and Big Bang, as well in their greatest hits album The Best of Big Bang 2006–2014.

== Reception and recognition ==
Reception for "Last Farewell" was positive, with Tamar Herman of Billboard ranking it at number nine in the magazine's list of ten best BigBang songs, writing that the single "hits all the right notes to be quintessential K-pop song: catchy chorus, swoon-worthy crooning, and a pump-up dance beat." Park Hyo-jae from The Chosun Ilbo praised its "addictive chorus" and "sophisticated electronic sound", commenting that the song being written by a member of the group set BigBang apart from the other idols. Park also complimented the group's stage fashion, noting that their use of high top sneakers and skinny jeans, as well as their hair styles, had become a trend among teenagers. The single's choreography, especially the jump rope movement, became a national phenomenon in South Korea. "Last Farewell" is recognized as one of the group's definitive songs, for setting the direction they would eventually go in on songs like "Fantastic Baby" and "Bang Bang Bang".

== Awards ==
Music program awards (8 total)
| Program | Date | Ref. |
|---|---|---|
| Music Bank | December 14, 2007 | |
| Music Bank | December 21, 2007 | |
| Music Bank | January 11, 2008 | |
| Music Bank | February 1, 2008 | |
| Inkigayo | December 16, 2007 | |
| Inkigayo | December 23, 2007 | |
| Inkigayo | January 13, 2008 | |
| M Countdown | January 17, 2008 | |

== Commercial performance ==
"Last Farewell" was released prior to the creation of the Gaon Music Chart, which began tracking music performance in 2010. The song topped various charts from online music services upon its release, including the Melon chart for eight consecutive weeks, holding the record for longest-running number-one song by a boy group. At another music service Mnet.com, the single remained at the first spot for six weeks, a record for the time. "Last Farewell" went to be awarded Song of the Month (December) in the 2008 Cyworld Digital Music Awards, recording 170,000 copies sold that month. The single was the fourth best-performing song of the 2000s (decade) in Melon, the highest entry by a male group.

== Controversies ==
The involvement of G-Dragon in writing and composing the melody – as it was unusual at the time for members of a band to be so involved in the production of their album – raised questions by netizens over how much the rapper actually produced. Yang Hyun-suk, founder and CEO of YG Entertainment, went on to clarify that G-Dragon wrote and composed the music, with arrangements done by long-time collaborator Brave Brothers. The success of BigBang spawned the creation of OkBang, a Chinese group whose music and looks were similar to the former.

== Track listing ==
- Digital download / streaming
1. "마지막 인사 (Last Farewell)" – 3:52
