= Gara Gara Go! =

"Gotta Gotta Go!! (ゴッタゴッタゴー!!; Gotta Gotta Gō!!)"

Single by BigBang

from the album Big Bang
- Language: Japanese
- Released: July 8, 2009
- Genre: J-pop; dance-pop; electropop; J-hip hop
- Length: 3:20
- Label: YG; Universal Music Japan
- Songwriters: Big-Ron; Shion; Ricci; Yug Japan
- Producers: Jimmy Thörnfeldt; Mohombi Moupondo; G-Dragon

BigBang singles chronology
"My Heaven" (2009)	"Gotta Gotta Go!! (ゴッタゴッタゴー!!; Gotta Gotta Gō!!)" (2009)	"Bringing You Love" (2009)

Music video
- "Garagara Go!!" on YouTube

"Gotta Gotta Go!!" (ゴッタゴッタゴー!!; Romanization: Gotta Gotta Gō!!) is the second Japanese single by the South Korean boy band BigBang released under YG Entertainment. The song has sold more than 30,829 copies so far.

== Track listings ==
"Gotta Gotta Go!!" – CD+DVD edition and CD Type A
No.	Title	Length
1.	"Gotta Gotta Go!!" (ゴッタゴッタゴー!!; Gotta Gotta Gō!!)	3:17
2.	"Top of the World"	3:00
3.	"Stylish"	3:07
Total length:		9:29

"Gotta Gotta Go!!" – CD Type B edition
No.	Title	Length
1.	"Gotta Gotta Go!!" (ゴッタゴッタゴー!!; Gotta Gotta Gō!!)	3:17
2.	"Top of the World"	3:00
3.	"So Beautiful"	3:38
Total length:		9:59

CD+DVD Edition – DVD bonus tracks
No.	Title	Length
1.	"Gotta Gotta Go!!; ガラガラゴー!!; Gara Gara Gō!!" (music video)
2.	"Gotta Gotta Go!!; ガラガラゴー!!; Gara Gara Gō!!" (music video – making of)

== Certifications ==
Certifications for "Gotta Gotta Go!!"
Region	Certification	Certified units/sales
Japan (RIAJ)	Gold	100,000^{*}
^{*} Sales figures based on certification alone.

== Release history ==
Region	Date	Format	Label
Japan	July 8, 2009	CD single; digital download	YG; Universal Music Japan
Japan	July 8, 2009	CD single + DVD	YG; Universal Music Japan
Taiwan	July 24, 2009	CD single + DVD	Universal Music Taiwan
Taiwan	August 28, 2009	CD single	Universal Music Taiwan
