= Haru Haru =

Single by BigBang

from the album Stand Up
- Language: Korean; Japanese
- Released: August 8, 2008
- Studio: YG (Seoul)
- Genre: K-pop
- Length: 4:15
- Label: YG
- Composers: G-Dragon; Daishi Dance
- Lyricist: G-Dragon
- Producers: G-Dragon; Daishi Dance

BigBang singles chronology
"With U" (2007)	"Haru Haru" (2008)	"Number 1" (2008)

Music video
- "Haru Haru" on YouTube

"Haru Haru" (Korean: 하루하루; lit. 'Day by Day') is a song by South Korean boy group BigBang. Released through YG Entertainment on August 8, 2008, as the lead single for their third extended play Stand Up, it became one of their most popular singles and one of South Korea's best-selling songs, besides being regarded as one of the most influential singles to come out of Korean pop music. A Japanese version of the song was included in their third Greatest Hits album The Best of Big Bang (2011) and in the Japanese version of Alive (2012).

== Composition ==
"Haru Haru" (2008)
"Haru Haru"'s mix of dance music, rap and ballad that leverages the strengths of all five members became one of Big Bang's signatures sounds.

With the release of their first EP Always (2007), BigBang began to incorporate a range of different genre into their music, moving away from their original hip hop roots, and Stand Up continued their experimentation. The song was written by G-Dragon, with arrangements provided by Japanese DJ Daishi Dance. Additional Japanese lyrics were written by Shikata, iNoZzi, and Shoko Fujibayashi. "Haru Haru" was described as a combination of a dance song with a hip hop ballad, driven by a sentimental piano melody. The song also includes a synthesizer sound that sounds like an orchestra that feels its "empty spaces". The composition was noted for "weaving in and out of tempos seamlessly" which forced a "a sense of anxiety on the listener." "Haru Haru" deepened the "Big Bang style" of music that had its breakthrough with "Lies." Tamar Herman of Billboard wrote about the track's composition:

The song begins simply enough with a piano tune and breathy vocals until T.O.P's deep bass rap explodes to transform it into a hip-hop ballad like none other. G-Dragon and T.O.P's contrasting rap tones play off one another to offer a sharp change from the passionate vocals of Daesung, Taeyang, and Seungri, while the orchestral accompaniment draws the whole thing to a symphonic peak. Nearly ten years after its release, 'Haru Haru' [sic] is still the epitome of Big Bang's sound.

== Critical reception ==
One of the group's most popular songs, receptions for "Haru Haru" were fairly positive. Billboard hailed the track an "experiential masterpiece" and named it the group's second best song. In a survey involving 30 music industry experts by South Korean magazine Dong-a Ilbo, "Haru Haru" was chosen as one of best male idol songs in the past 20 years. Spinditty felt that the track "has a nostalgic feeling, which conveys the tragic, sad, and deep story behind the song." Sun-Times included "Haru Haru" in their list of the best BigBang songs, calling the track "an enduring anthem for the band."

E. Alex Jung from Vulture called "Haru Haru" "the undisputed song of the decade", commenting on the single's influence, he wrote that the song presented a sound that "was once innovative" but it "has since been copied and standardized to the point where almost every boy band now has a charismatic rapper with a booming voice." Jung concluded that "Haru Haru" "tapped into the Zeitgeist, blending a deep affinity for torch songs with the swagger of hip-hop, and set a wildfire to the K-pop fandom." In 2023, Rolling Stone ranked "Haru Haru" number 7 in their list of the 100 greatest Korean pop songs of all time.

== Accolades ==
Awards and nominations
Year	Award-giving body	Category	Result	Ref.
2008	Mnet KM Music Festival	Best Male Group	Won	
2008	Mnet KM Music Festival	Best House and Electronic Song	Nominated	
2008	Mnet KM Music Festival	Song of the Year	Nominated	
2008	Cyworld Digital Music Awards	Song of the Month (August)	Won	

Music program awards (9 total)
Program	Date	Ref.
Inkigayo	August 24, 2008	
Inkigayo	August 31, 2008	
Inkigayo	September 7, 2008	
M Countdown	August 28, 2008	
M Countdown	September 4, 2008	
M Countdown	September 11, 2008	
Music Bank	September 5, 2008	
Music Bank	September 12, 2008	
Music Bank	September 26, 2008	

== Commercial performance ==
The song was released prior to the creation of the Gaon Music Chart, which began tracking sales in 2010. "Haru Haru" topped several online charts upon its release and held the number one position on the online Melon Music Chart for seven consecutive weeks. It also became one of the most successful singles of all-time in South Korea, selling over 5.4 million digital downloads in South Korea alone. In 2016, "Haru Haru" was revealed to be the fifth most downloaded song in South Korea since 2006. The song ranked at number eight in Melon's 2000s (decade) chart. In Cyworld, "Haru Haru" was the best-selling track of 2008 and the sixth best-selling song of all time.

== Music video ==
The music video for "Haru Haru" presents a storyline where G-Dragon plays the protagonist that believes his girlfriend, played by actress Park Min-young, is cheating on him with his friend, played by T.O.P, and the two enter a physical fight with each other. By the end of the video, it's revealed that Park Min-young and T.O.P were only pretending to cheat because she was with a deadly disease and wanted to spare the one she loved the pain of knowing she was going to die. G-Dragon learns of this too late and arrives at the hospital to an already-gone girl. The music video was well received, being distinguished for its "heart wrenching storyline" and is recognized as a classic and as the most saddening video release by the quintet. In 2016, fans voted "Haru Haru" as their favorite BigBang music video. The video was parodied by the cast of the Korean TV show Infinite Challenge at the show's 2008 year-end festival.

== Credits and personnel ==
Credits adapted from the EP's liner notes.

Studio

- YG Studio – recording, mixing
- Sterling Sound – mastering

Personnel

- Yang Hyun-suk – executive producer
- Big Bang – vocals
  - G-Dragon – producer, Korean lyrics, composition
- Shikata – Japanese lyrics
- iNoZzi – Japanese lyrics
- Shoko Fujibayashi – Japanese lyrics
- Daishi Dance – producer, composition, arrangement
- Oh Young-taek – recording
- Lee Kyung-joon – recording
- Jason Roberts – mixing
- Tom Coyne – mastering

== Charts ==
=== Weekly charts ===
2012 weekly chart performance for "Haru Haru"
Chart (2012)	Peak position
US World Digital Songs (Billboard)	13

2026 weekly chart performance for "Haru Haru"
Chart (2026)	Peak position
Singapore (RIAS)	12
South Korea (Circle)	78
Taiwan (Billboard)	20
Vietnam Hot 100 (Billboard)	41

=== Monthly charts ===
Chart (2025)	Peak position
South Korea (Circle)	102

=== Year-end charts ===
Year-end chart performance for "Haru Haru"
Chart (2025)	Position
South Korea (Circle)	149

== Sales ==
Country	Sales
South Korea (digital)	5,400,000
