= Stand Up (EP) =

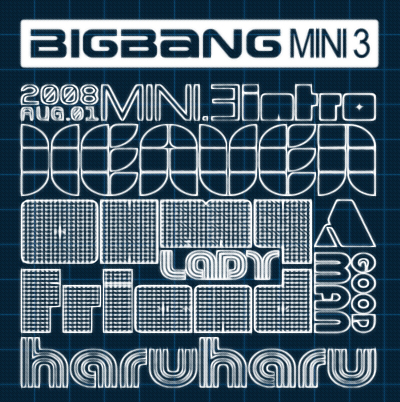

EP by BigBang
- Released: August 8, 2008
- Recorded: 2008
- Genre: R&B; hip hop, rap rock
- Length: 20:09
- Language: Korean
- Label: YG; Mnet Media
- Producer: G-Dragon; Teddy; Kush; T.O.P

BigBang chronology
With U (2008)	Stand Up (2008)	Number 1 (2008)

Singles from Stand Up
- 1. "Haru Haru" Released: August 8, 2008

Stand Up is the third Korean extended play by South Korean boy group BigBang. It was released on August 8, 2008. The EP sold over 140,000 copies by the end of the following month, supported by the popularity of the number one hit single "Haru Haru". The song became one of the most downloaded singles of all-time in South Korea. Star News named Stand Up one of the most successful digital albums since 2004.

== Background ==
Teasers for the album was released on August 1, including the announcement that Japanese DJ Daishi Dance had collaborated with the group on a song. Released on August 8, 2008, the EP sold more than 30,000 copies in two days and sold 100,000 copies in two weeks. Stand Up was the number-one album of the month for August 2008, becoming the group's first monthly number-one album in South Korea. It eventually sold over 168,000 copies by 2016.

== Track listing ==
No.	Title	Lyrics	Music	Arrangement	Length
1.	"Intro (Stand Up)"	G-Dragon	G-Dragon, Teddy, Kush	Teddy, Kush	1:35
2.	"Haru Haru" (하루하루)	G-Dragon	G-Dragon, Daishi Dance	Daishi Dance	4:15
3.	"Heaven" (천국; Cheonguk)	G-Dragon	G-Dragon, Daishi Dance	Daishi Dance	4:06
4.	"A Good Man" (착한 사람; Chaghan Salam)	T.O.P	T.O.P, Kush	Kush	3:23
5.	"Lady"	G-Dragon	G-Dragon, Teddy	Teddy	3:19
6.	"Oh My Friend" (featuring No Brain)	G-Dragon	G-Dragon, No Brain	No Brain	3:31
Total length:					20:09

== Personnel ==
Credits for Stand Up adapted are from album liner notes.

- Choi Seung-hyun "T.O.P" – co-producer and recording producer
- Tom Coyne – mastering
- Hong Jang-hyun – photographer
- Ji Eun – make-up and stylist
- Jang Sung-eun – artwork and design
- Kim Byunghoon "Kush" – co-producer and recording producer
- Kim Chang-kyum – recording engineer
- Kim Tae-hyun – hair stylist
- Kwon Ji-yong "G-Dragon" – producer and recording producer
- Lee Byung-young – artist manager
- Lee Gyeong-jun – recording engineer
- Lee Kang-hyun – art director
- Oh Young-taek – recording engineer
- Park Hong-jun "Teddy" – co-producer and recording producer
- Jason Robert – mixing engineer
- Today Art – printing
- Yang Eun-jin – artwork and design
- Yang Hyun Suk – executive producer, mixing engineer and producer
- Yang Min-Suk – executive supervisor

== Charts ==
=== Weekly charts ===
Chart (2010)	Peak position
South Korean Albums (Gaon)	9

=== Monthly charts ===
Chart (August 2008)	Peak position
South Korean Albums (MIAK)	1
