= Hot Issue (EP) =

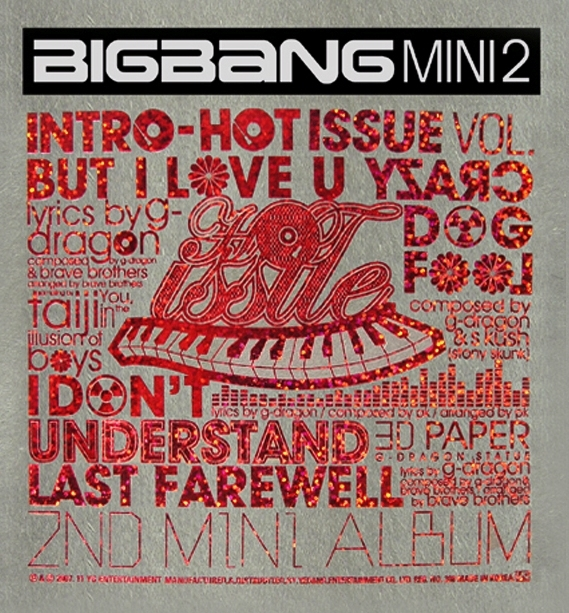

EP by BigBang
- Released: November 22, 2007
- Recorded: 2007
- Genre: K-pop; hip hop; R&B
- Length: 21:02
- Language: Korean
- Label: YG; Yedang Company
- Producer: G-Dragon; Brave Brothers

BigBang chronology
Always (2007)	Hot Issue (2007)	For the World (2008)

Singles from Hot Issue
- 1. "Last Farewell" Released: November 22, 2007

Hot Issue is the second Korean-language extended play (EP) by South Korean boy band BigBang. It was released under YG Entertainment on November 22, 2007, and spawned the single "Last Farewell".

== Composition ==
The group's leader, the then 20-year-old G-Dragon produced and wrote the lyrics for all tracks on Hot Issue. "Last Farewell" is a blend of trance hip-hop beats and pop melodies. The song also features rapping by G-Dragon and T.O.P and melodic vocals from Taeyang, Daesung, and Seungri. "Crazy Dog" features synthesizers and a sampling from the Seo Taiji and Boys song "In My Fantasy."

== Reception ==
Hot Issue marked BigBang's first EP after Always and further established the group's popularity in South Korea, with the single "Last Farewell" topping online charts for 8 consecutive weeks. Due to the song's digital success, it won the Song of the Month award at Cyworld Digital Music Awards. The extended play sold over a 120,000 copies in South Korea.

== Track listing ==
No.	Title	Lyrics	Music	Arrangement	Length
1.	"Intro (Hot Issue)" (featuring CL)	G-Dragon	G-Dragon	Brave Brothers	1:23
2.	"Fool" (바보; Babo)	G-Dragon	G-Dragon	Brave Brothers	3:46
3.	"But I Love U" (G-Dragon solo)	G-Dragon	G-Dragon, S Kush	S Kush	4:15
4.	"I Don't Understand"	G-Dragon	Choi Pil-kang	Choi Pil-kang	4:06
5.	"Crazy Dog"	G-Dragon	G-Dragon, Brave Brothers, Perry	Brave Brothers	3:40
6.	"Last Farewell" (마지막 인사; Majimak Insa)	G-Dragon	G-Dragon, Brave Brothers	Brave Brothers	3:53
Total length:					21:02

Sample credits

- "But I Love U" contains a sample of "Rhu of Redd Holt Unlimited" by Paula
- "Crazy Dog" contains a sample of "You, In the Fantasy" (환상 속의 그대; Huansang Sogae Gudae) by Seo Taiji & Boys

== Charts ==
=== Weekly charts ===
Chart (2010)	Peak position
South Korean Albums (Gaon)	8

=== Monthly charts ===
Chart (April 2010)	Peak position
South Korean Albums (Gaon)	32
