= Always (BigBang EP) =

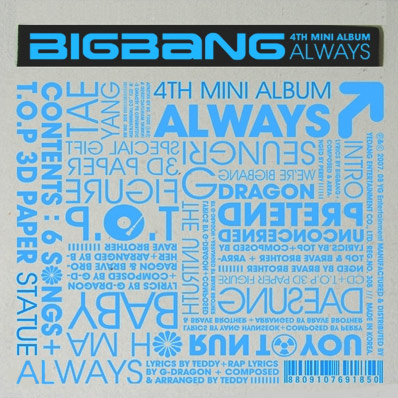

EP by BigBang
- Released: August 16, 2007
- Recorded: 2007
- Genre: K-pop; hip-hop; R&B
- Length: 20:44
- Language: Korean
- Label: YG; Yedang Company
- Producer: Brave Brothers; Perry; Teddy Park

BigBang chronology
First Live Concert: The Real (2007)	Always (2007)	Hot Issue (2007)

Singles from Always
- 1. "Lies" Released: August 16, 2007

Always is the first Korean EP by South Korean boy band BigBang, released under YG Entertainment on August 16, 2007. Commercially, the album recorded pre-orders of 30,000 copies and sold over 55,000 copies by the end of October 2007.

== Legacy ==
Always (2007) marked a change of BigBang's musical styles from their previous efforts, with the group experimenting with electronic dance music and setting it as the new music trend in Korea. It was also the first release in Korean's music industry to be promoted as a "mini-album".

The lead single "Lies" (거짓말; Geojitmal), composed by G-Dragon, was a no.1 hit, topping Cyworld charts for two months in a row, eventually becoming their break-out hit and Song of the Year in the 2007 Mnet Asian Music Awards. "Lies" was named the "Song of the Decade" by Mnet's M! Countdown. On 2016, it was labeled the "Top Male Idol Song in The Best 20 Years" by music experts. The song was revealed to be the second most downloaded in the past nine years in South Korea.

Billboard stated that "Lies" placed BigBang "down the path into the realm of avant-garde experimentalism that they’ve become known for over the past few years" and called one of South Korea's "most memorable songs." The impact of the song was described by Kang Myung Suk – a music critic and former editor-in-chief of 10Asia magazine. Suk wrote "in that time, the one song 'Lies' satisfied all the music consumers in Korea. The 'sound' of this song was better than the normal kpop, and the melody development was easy for anyone to enjoy. Before 'Lies' came out, the music charts were dominated by medium tempo ballad songs." The composition was also praised, noting that "G-Dragon made this song with memorable rap and melody pieces" and admired the song for having "no useless parts". The critic concluded "'Lies' has the generation's code who wants to be a step forward in the trend but comfortable at the same time, and that wants to stand out but also somewhat mix in at the same time. This was a market that not exist before BigBang's 'Lies', and this was the moment where the idols met this generation’s emotions."

== Track listing ==
No.	Title	Lyrics	Music	Arrangement	Length
1.	"We Are BigBang (Intro)"	Choi Seung-hyun; Dong Young-bae; Kang Dae-sung; Kwon Ji-yong	Perry	Perry	1:37
2.	"Lies" (거짓말; Geojitmal)	Kwon Ji-yong	Kwon Ji-yong	Brave Brothers	3:49
3.	"Wrong Number" (없는 번호; Eoptneun Beonho)	Yang Hyun-suk	Perry; Kang Dong-chul	Brave Brothers	3:38
4.	"Act Like Nothing's Wrong" (T.O.P solo ft. Kim Ji-eun; 아무렇지 않은 척; Amureochi Anheun Cheok)	Choi Seung-hyun	Choi Seung-hyun; Dong-chul	Brave Brothers	3:56
5.	"Oh Ma Baby"	Kwon Ji-yong	Kwon Ji-yong; Dong-chul	Brave Brothers	3:51
6.	"Always"	Park Hong-jun; Ji-yong	Hong-jun; Perry	Teddy Park	3:53
Total length:					20:44

== Charts ==
=== Weekly charts ===
Chart (2010)	Peak position
South Korean Albums (Gaon)	11

=== Monthly charts ===
Chart (September 2007)	Peak position
South Korean Albums (MIAK)	4
