= Daishi Dance =

Japanese DJ and record producer

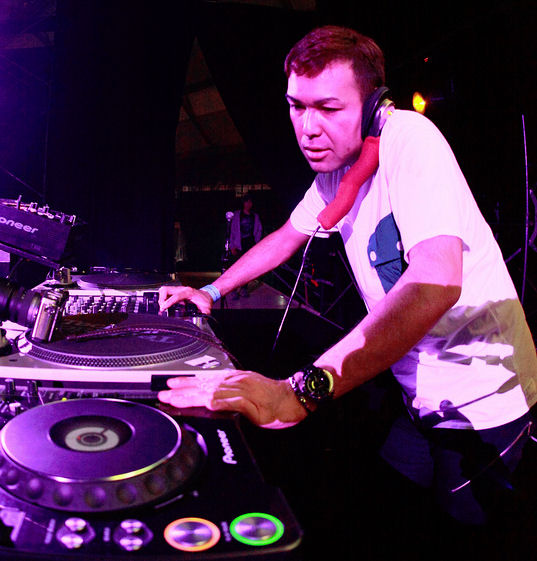

Background information
- Born: 鈴木 大士 (Suzuki Daishi); 1976 (age 49–50)
- Origin: Sapporo, Hokkaido, Japan
- Genres: House; EDM
- Occupation: DJ
- Years active: 2006–present
- Labels: Apt./new World Records (2006–09); Urban Sound Project (2008–12); Universal J (2012–present)
- Website: http://www.universal-music.co.jp/daishidance

Daishi Suzuki (Japanese: 鈴木 大士, Hepburn: Suzuki Daishi; born in 1976), known professionally as Daishi Dance, is a male Japanese DJ and record producer.

== Summary ==
Daishi Dance performs in the heart of Sapporo, creating melodious house mixes that feature vocals conveying grief and discontent, and using three turn tables in a hybrid DJ style. Daishi Dance has performed at many events with artists such as Studio Apartment and FreeTEMPO. He has performed at CLUB YELLOW, in Roppongi, as well as with Masanori Morita of Studio Apartment, as the duet "MUSeUM", which performs at many regular events in the club. Since March 2008, Daishi Dance has performed at the club ageHa, in Shinkiba, Tokyo at the regular party called "POOL HOUSE", and certain other events. On July 2, 2008, Daishi Dance released "The Ghibli Set", which contained 12 licensed remixes songs featured in movies created by Studio Ghibli. This album hit number 12 on the Oricon charts, and remained at this position for 3 weeks.

== Discography ==
=== Albums ===
1. The P.I.A.N.O. Set (July 19, 2006)
2. Melodies Melodies (October 3, 2007)
3. Spectacle. (October 7, 2009)
4. Wonder Tourism (November 14, 2012)
5. New Party! (September 25, 2013)
6. Gekimori (August 6, 2014)

=== Cover albums ===
- The Ghibli Set (July 2, 2008)
- The Ghibli Set 2 (December 18, 2013)

=== Remix compilations ===
- Daishi Dance Remix (January 21, 2009)
- Daishi Dance Remix... 2 (November 3, 2010)

=== Mixtapes ===
- MyDJBooth: DJ Mix 1 (April 28, 2010)
- MyDJBooth.2 (November 9, 2011)
- MyDJBooth.3 (March 27, 2013)
- EDM Land (May 14, 2014)

=== Original productions ===
- 2008: Chieko Kinbara – "Romance for Strings"
- 2008: Arvin Homa Aya – "Winter Love"
- 2008: BIGBANG – "Haru Haru" and "Heaven"
- 2010: Mika Nakashima – "Memory"
- 2010: Miliyah Kato – "I Miss You"
- 2011: Rainbow – "To Me"
- 2011: After School – "Shampoo"
- 2011: Mucc – "Arcadia"
- 2012: Maki Nomiya – "Sweet Soul Revue"
- 2012: Orange Caramel – "Milkshake"
- 2013: Miliyah Kato – "Nemurenu Yoru no Sei de"
- 2013: Miliyah Kato – "With U"
- 2014: Miliyah Kato – "Emotion"
- 2014: Ayumi Hamasaki – "What is Forever Love"
- 2015: Ayumi hamasaki – "Sayonara (feat. SpeXial)"

=== Remixes ===
- 2007: Axwell – "I Found You"
- 2007: Free Tempo – "Harmony"
- 2007: Michael Gray – "The Weekend"
- 2007: Double – "Spring Love"
- 2008: Mika Nakashima – "Sakura (Hanagasumi)"
- 2008: Miley Cyrus – "7 Things"
- 2008: Ayumi Hamasaki – "Heaven"
- 2008: Chieko Kinbara – "Romance for Strings"
- 2008: Genki Rockets – "Star Surfer"
- 2008: Roland Clark presents Urban Soul – "Life Time"
- 2009: Coldfeet – "Okay With Me"
- 2009: BWO – "Sunshine in the Rain"
- 2009: May J. – "Garden"
- 2009: Junsu/Jejung/Yuchun – "Long Way"
- 2010: Mitomi Tokoto – "That Ibiza Track"
- 2011: Marié Digby – "Part Of Your World"
- 2013: Carly Rae Jepsen – "Call Me Maybe"

== Chart positions ==
- Oricon Album Chart Number 12 for the Album "The Ghibli Set" on the week of July 21.

Held for three weeks.
