= Shoko Fujibayashi =

Japanese lyricist (born 1972)

Shoko Fujibayashi (藤林 聖子, Fujibayashi Shōko; born February 18, 1972) is a Japanese lyricist who has written the lyrics for several tokusatsu television series' theme songs. Most recently, Fujibayashi has worked with Shuhei Naruse on the soundtracks of Kamen Rider Den-O, Kamen Rider Kiva, and their films. She has also worked with Nana Mizuki, May'n, BoA, Ken Hirai, Sowelu, 2PM, Mikuni Shimokawa, Crystal Kay, Beni Arashiro, Daisuke Hasegawa, Issa of Da Pump, Lead, and Miho Kanno.

== List of songs written by Shoko Fujibayashi ==
Year	Label	Album	Artist	Song	Lyrics		Music	
Year	Label	Album	Artist	Song	Credited	With	Credited	With
2004	Avex Trax	Love & Honesty	BoA	"Rock with You"	Yes		No	Kazuhiro Hara
2004	Avex Trax	Love & Honesty	BoA	"Midnight Parade"	Yes		No	Bounceback
2004	Avex Trax	Love & Honesty	BoA	"Milky Way"	Yes	Kenzie	No	Kazuhiro Hara
2011	Ariola Japan	Republic of 2PM	2PM	"Heartbeat" (Japanese version)	Yes	J. Y. Park, Yu Shimoji, KOMU	No	J. Y. Park
2015	Universal Music Japan	Pink Season	Apink	"Mr. Chu"	Yes		No	Duble Sidekick, David Kim
2015	Ariola Japan	Galaxy of 2PM	2PM	"Try Your Imagination"	Yes	Wooyoung, Frants	No	Wooyoung, Frants
2016	YGEX	Made Series	BigBang	"Loser" (Japanese version)	Yes	G-Dragon	No	G-Dragon, P.K, Dee.P
2016	Universal Music Japan	Shine	Pentagon	"Shine" (Japanese version)	Yes	E'Dawn, Hui, Yuto, Wooseok	No	Flow Blow, Hui, E'Dawn
2017	Warner Music Japan	#Twice	Twice	"TT" (Japanese version)	Yes	Sam Lewis	No	Black Eyed Pilseung
2019	Universal Music Japan	Happiness/Sha La La	Pentagon	"Sha La La" (Japanese version)	Yes	Hui, Wooseok	No	Hui, Han Yo Han, Minit
2020	Cube Entertainment	Digital single	Pentagon	"Daisy" (Japanese version)	Yes	Hui, Wooseok	No	Hui, Wooseok, 네이슨 (NATHAN)
2022	Warner Music Japan	Celebrate	Twice	"Flow Like Waves"	Yes		No	Ejae, Anna Timgren, Aaron Kim
