= Bang Bang Bang (BigBang song) =

- Promotional picture

Single by BigBang

from the album Made and Made Series
- Language: Korean; Japanese
- A-side: "We Like 2 Party"
- Released: June 1, 2015
- Studio: YG (Seoul)
- Genre: Trap; EDM
- Length: 3:40
- Label: YG
- Composers: Teddy; G-Dragon
- Lyricists: G-Dragon; Teddy; T.O.P
- Producers: G-Dragon; Teddy

BigBang singles chronology
"Bae Bae" (2015)	"Bang Bang Bang" (2015)	"We Like 2 Party" (2015)

Music video
- "Bang Bang Bang" on YouTube

"Bang Bang Bang" (Korean: 뱅뱅뱅; RR: Baengbaengbaeng) is a song recorded by South Korean boy band BigBang. Initially released as part of the single album A on June 1, 2015, through YG Entertainment, the song served as one of the eight lead singles from the band's third Korean-language studio album Made, which would be released more than a year later on December 13, 2016. It was written and composed by member G-Dragon along with long-time group collaborator Teddy Park, with additional rap parts penned by member T.O.P.

"Bang Bang Bang" received generally positive reviews from music critics, who complimented the track's energetic sound and the group's performance. The song was a commercial success, ranking as the best-performing single in South Korea during 2015. It also peaked atop the Billboard World Digital Song Sales chart and entered the SNEP singles chart in France. The Japanese version of the song peaked at number two on the Japan Hot 100, and was certified gold by the Recording Industry Association of Japan (RIAJ) in digital downloads and streaming.

The success of "Bang Bang Bang" led it to win various awards in South Korea and abroad, including Song of the Year at 2015 Mnet Asian Music Awards, making the group the second artist to have won the award twice. It won Song of the Year at the 2015 Melon Music Awards, Best Song at the 2016 Seoul Music Awards, and was voted the most popular song of 2015 on Gallup Korea. It was awarded the Asian Song of the Year by Download at the Japan Gold Disc Awards in 2016 and 2017, and was named one of the Top Ten International Gold Songs at the RTHK International Pop Poll Awards.

== Background and promotion ==
The first poster titled "Bang Bang Bang" was released on May 27. YG Entertainment's then-CEO Yang Hyun-suk commented that the song was "the most powerful music you have ever heard before." Before its release on June 1 at midnight, the members hosted a live streaming on the app V from the news portal Naver, where they talked about the new songs and answered fans questions. The first televised live performance was held in the Mnet music show M Countdown along with "We Like 2 Party". The group also appeared on the talk show You Hee-yeol's Sketchbook to perform the single on its June 5 episode.

"Bang Bang Bang" was translated for Japanese to be included in their album Made Series (2016). The Japanese version gained a new music video, that is essentially the same as the Korean original, but edited to be shorter in length. This version was performed in the Japanese TV shows Music Station, Momm!!, Space Shower TV, among others.

== Composition ==
"Bang Bang Bang"
A 22-second sample of "Bang Bang Bang", which is noted for containing a dance beat that changes to a "trap-heavy breakdown" in the chorus.

"Bang Bang Bang"'s verses feature a dance beat that were described as "'90s inspired", reminiscent of Diplo and Disclosure, with a "quasi-Migos flow over a hi-NRG" sound. The song then shifts into a "trap-heavy breakdown" in the chorus, and culminating into another breakdown, with chants of "Let the bass drum go". Additionally, "reverberating synths filt" throughout the track, "playing off the pounding rhythm and powerful horns", giving "Bang Bang Bang" a "chaotic environment". The chorus features the hook "Like you've been shot, bang bang bang", which was noted for being "less onomatopoeic and more a homage to the band."

== Critical reception ==
Billboard placed the track at the tenth spot in their best BigBang songs list, calling the single "impossible to ignore," stating that, even though "the sudden shift in pacing throughout the single come off as jarring upon first listen," the track's "stuttering rhythm," "chaotic environment" and "frenzied energy" makes the song "all that more compelling." Sun-Times included "Bang Bang Bang" in their unranked list of ten best BigBang songs, claiming that "this club-ready track takes classic BigBang swagger to new levels of sophistication." The Muse felt that the single "savvily hits every note, including anthemic trap breakdown" describing the song as "literally, lit." Fuse compared the song to their 2012 single "Fantastic Baby", hailing both as "nonstop party" tracks. KKBox praised the track's energetic sound, and hailed "Bang Bang Bang" a classical song from the band. Thump choose it as one of best songs of summer, feeling that the "multi-genre banger" is "fire in any language, in any country."

== Commercial performance ==
"Bang Bang Bang" had the highest first-week sales in 2015 by a group on the Gaon Chart, with 339,856 downloads sold. It peaked at number one on the Gaon Digital Chart. By the end of June, "Bang Bang Bang" was number one on the monthly digital chart, with a total of 681,111 digital sales and 26.472 million streams. On Gaon's year-end chart issue for 2015, "Bang Bang Bang" was ranked as the best performing song of the year, having been downloaded 1,581,284 times. In September 2018, Gaon revealed that the song surpassed 2,500,000 downloads in South Korea. In the United States, the single held the two top spots on the Billboard US World Digital Songs chart along with "We Like 2 Party", the second time for the group after the previous release M, which led them tying with Psy's record for being the only K-pop act to hold the top two slots on the chart twice. Billboard named "Bang Bang Bang" the biggest K-pop song on the World Digital Chart during the summer of 2015. On the chart's year-end issue, it ranked at number five and was the third best-selling K-pop song in the US, behind only Psy's "Gangnam Style" and 2NE1's "I Am the Best".

In Europe, "Bang Bang Bang" peaked at number 194 on the France SNEP singles chart, number 44 on the UK Indie Singles chart, and number 30 on the Official Finnish Download Chart. In Japan, the Japanese version of the song peaked at number two on the Billboard Japan Hot 100 in the week of February 20, 2016. It appeared on the chart's year-end issue for two consecutive years, ranking at number 28 in 2016 and number 95 in 2017. "Bang Bang Bang" was certified gold by the Recording Industry Association of Japan (RIAJ) twice for surpassing 100,000 downloads and 50,000,000 streams in May 2016 and October 2022, respectively. The single also ranked second as the most popular Korean singles in 2015 in Taiwan by music streaming service KKBox. In 2017, the song ranked first place on the top 10 tracks of the year in the Japanese version of KKBox.

== Accolades ==
"Bang Bang Bang" received numerous accolades, including Song of the Year at the annual Mnet Asian Music Awards and Melon Music Awards. It was named one of the top ten international gold songs at the 2016 RTHK International Pop Poll Awards and won two Song of the Year by Download accolades from the Japan Gold Disc Awards in 2016 and 2017. Additionally, "Bang Bang Bang" received four consecutive Melon Weekly Popularity Awards.

Awards and nominations for "Bang Bang Bang"
Organization	Year	Award	Result	Ref.
Gaon Chart Music Awards	2016	Song of the Month (June)	Won	
Japan Gold Disc Awards	2016	Song of the Year by Download (Asia)	Won	
Japan Gold Disc Awards	2017	Song of the Year by Download (Asia)	Won	
Melon Music Awards	2015	Song of the Year	Won	
Melon Music Awards	2015	Netizen Popularity Award	Won	
Mnet Asian Music Awards	2015	Song of the Year	Won	
Mnet Asian Music Awards	2015	Best Dance Performance	Nominated	
MTV Iggy	2015	International Song of Summer	Won	
QQ Music Awards	2016	Best Music Video of the Year	Won	
RTHK International Pop Poll Awards	2016	Top Ten International Gold Songs	Won	
Seoul Music Awards	2016	Best Song Award	Won	

Music program awards
Program	Date	Ref.
M Countdown	June 11, 2015	
M Countdown	June 25, 2015	
Inkigayo	June 14, 2015	
Inkigayo	June 28, 2015	

== Music video ==
"Bang Bang Bang" music video was directed by Seo Hyun-seung and choreographed by Parris Goebel, who makes an appearance on the video. The video was well received by critics. Jeff Benjamin from Fuse described it as "an over-the-top affair, with the guys rocking a slew of wild looks, hairdos and fashions in a neon-tinged world," while Eric Ducker from Rolling Stone claimed that "nothing from [this year] really beats the explosive grandiosity of 'Bang Bang Bang' from genre legends BigBang." Billboard highlighted the members' "boundary pushing" high-fashion. Stereogum hailed it an "insanely epic video," and admired the video's "beautiful, absurd riot of glitter and pink hair and hydraulic low-riders and flamethrowers and tricked-out motorcycles and grenade launchers and studded leather and androgynous models on leashes and anti-aircraft guns and cowboy hats and Buckingham Palace guard hats and assault vehicles being driven like chariots."

Stereogum ranked the music video at number 14 in their list of the 50 Best Music Videos of 2015, the only non-English work mentioned. Miami New Times wrote that the "bombastic" video highlights "what the Hallyu is all about", featuring "insane costumes, dynamic dancing, and production values that match, even surpass, those of their Western competitors." The video became most viewed K-pop group video of 2015 and second most viewed video by a K-pop group overall at the time, only behind their own "Fantastic Baby." On January 19, 2016, it reached 100 million views on YouTube, the second music video by a K-pop boy group to do so. It became the second K-pop group music video to surpass 200 million views on January 11, 2017.

=== Controversy ===
The group was criticized for appropriating Native American culture because of the war bonnet, worn only by those who have earned the highest honors in their tribes, Seungri wears in the video. The Muse described the incident as "another example of K-pop appropriation" stating that "Western culture's various racial stereotypes" are "consumed and blown-out" by the genre "that it almost seems like an avenue in which to decentralize and possibly even defang some of those."

== Covers and usage in media ==
In January 2016, iKon covered the song during the Seoul concerts of their iKoncert 2016: Showtime Tour. December 2016, A.C.E performed a dance cover of "Bang Bang Bang" while busking in the Hongdae area of Seoul. In September 2018, Wanna One covered "Bang Bang Bang" at the Music Bank World Tour concert in Berlin; members of Dreamcatcher also performed a cover the song at the 2018 Jeju Hallyu Festival that November. In 2019, Stray Kids covered "Bang Bang Bang" at the 33rd Golden Disc Awards. At the 2021 KBS Song Festival, Yeonjun, Taehyun and Huening Kai from TXT and Ni-ki and Heeseung from Enhypen covered the song as part of a "Legend of K-pop" medley performance. In April 2022, Treasure performed the song along with several others at their Trace Concert at the Olympic Hall.

== Legacy ==
"Bang Bang Bang" topped the 2015 Gallup Korea annual poll of nationwide Koreans between the ages of 13 and 59 for Song of the Year. In 2016, song was chosen by the South Korean government to be a part of the loudspeaker propaganda broadcast into North Korean borders, in response to the January 2016 nuclear tests. It was also sung by Seoul university students during the 2016 South Korean protests for the resignation of president Park Geun-hye. In 2023, Rolling Stone ranked "Bang Bang Bang" number 66 in their list of the 100 Greatest Songs in the History of Korean Pop Music, writing that it "had immediate impact upon arrival, with newer groups still covering it seven years later. It's an instant mood-booster".

== Credits and personnel ==
Credits adapted from the album's liner notes.

Studio

- YG Studio – recording, mixing
- Sterling Sound – mastering

Personnel

- Yang Hyun-suk – executive producer
- BigBang – vocals
  - T.O.P – lyrics
  - G-Dragon – producer, lyrics, composition
- Teddy Park – producer, lyrics, composition, arrangement
- Lee Tae-yoon – bass
- Lee Kyung-joon – recording
- Jason Roberts – mixing
- Tom Coyne – mastering

== Charts ==
=== Weekly charts ===
2015–2016 weekly chart performance for "Bang Bang Bang"
Chart (2015–2016)	Peak position
Finland Download (Latauslista)	30
France (SNEP)	194
Japan (Japan Hot 100)	2
South Korea (Gaon)	1
UK Independent Singles (OCC)	44
US World Digital Songs (Billboard)	1

2024–2025 weekly chart performance for "Bang Bang Bang"
Chart (2024–2026)	Peak position
Global Excl. US (Billboard)	154
Malaysia (Billboard)	24
Singapore Regional (RIAS)	7

=== Year-end charts ===
2015 year-end chart positions for "Bang Bang Bang"
Chart (2015)	Position
South Korea (Gaon)	1
US World Digital Songs (Billboard)	5

2016 year-end chart positions for "Bang Bang Bang"
Chart (2016)	Position
Japan (Japan Hot 100)	28
US World Digital Songs (Billboard)	16

2017 year-end chart positions for "Bang Bang Bang"
Chart (2017)	Position
Japan (Japan Hot 100)	95

2025 year-end chart performance for "Bang Bang Bang"
Chart (2025)	Position
South Korea (Circle)	136

== Certifications and sales ==
Sales and certifications for "Bang Bang Bang"
Region	Certification	Certified units/sales
Japan (RIAJ) Japanese ver.	Gold	100,000^{*}
New Zealand (RMNZ)	Gold	15,000^{‡}
South Korea	—	2,500,000
United States	—	11,000
Streaming
Japan (RIAJ) Japanese ver.	Platinum	100,000,000^{†}
Japan (RIAJ) Korean ver.	Gold	50,000,000^{†}
^{*} Sales figures based on certification alone.^{‡} Sales+streaming figures based on certification alone.^{†} Streaming-only figures based on certification alone.

== Release history ==
Release dates and formats for "Bang Bang Bang"
Region	Date	Language	Format	Label	Ref.
South Korea	June 1, 2015	Korean	Digital download	YG Entertainment	
Various	June 1, 2015	Korean	Digital download	YG Entertainment	
Japan	June 17, 2015	Korean	Digital download	YGEX	
Japan	February 3, 2016	Japanese	Digital download	YGEX	
