= Lies (BigBang song) =

2007 single by Big Bang

Single by Big Bang

from the album Always
- Released: August 16, 2007
- Recorded: 2007
- Studio: YG (Seoul)
- Genre: Hip hop; dance-pop
- Length: 3:49
- Label: YG
- Songwriter: G-Dragon
- Producer: G-Dragon

Big Bang singles chronology
"Shake It" (2006)	"Lies" (2007)	"Always" (2007)

Music video
- "Lies" on YouTube

"Lies" (Korean: 거짓말; RR: Geojitmal) is a song recorded by the South Korean boy group BigBang. The song was written and composed by rapper G-Dragon. It was released on August 16, 2007, by YG Entertainment as the first single from BigBang's first extended play Always (2007). It became the group's breakout hit, topping charts in their home country for several weeks and consequently winning Song of the Year at the 2007 Mnet Asian Music Awards. The song remains one of their most critically acclaimed song to date and is often viewed as one of their signature songs.

== Background and composition ==
BigBang's first extended play, Always (2007), marked several changes for the group. Though the members had previously involved themselves with writing and composing, the group took more creative control over their music, moving away from their hip-hop and R&B roots and towards electronic dance music. G-Dragon composed and wrote most of the tracks included in their first EP, including "Lies." The rapper originally wrote this track for his solo album, but the company decided it would suit the group better.

An electronic dance track combined with hip-hop elements, "Lies" begins with a dial tone, and that builds up around a "subtle piano, brassy percussion, and a clapping beat." The chorus blends "boy-band harmonies and hip-hop chants", which was described as "something fresh" for K-pop in 2007, while the vocals were described as "delicate". Arirang TV called the track a "Euro-house style piece, lanced with trance." Lyrically, the song describes a break-up, with the line "I'm so sorry but I love you" being used as the hook.

== Critical reception ==
"Lies" received near universal acclaim from music critics, who described the song as "through the roof." Korean website Star News published an article commenting that BigBang's music "stands out" from other K-pop boy groups, because of their "impressive melody lines" in tracks like "Lies". Tamar Herman of Billboard wrote that the "melodic, surging chorus and some rapid-fire rap" of "Lies" placed BigBang "down the path into the realm of avant-garde experimentalism that they've become known for over the past few years" and called one of South Korea's "most memorable songs."

Kaitlin Miller of Sun-Times stated that even though their sound has evolved, "their core blend of emotion and swagger shines through on this song." While including "Lies" in a list of best songs written by G-Dragon, the Korean magazine Ize commented that BigBang's rebel image, and the track's easy melody and easy lyrics were the formula that brought the single's popularity.

The impact of the song was described by Kang Myung Suk - a music critic and former editor-in-chief of 10Asia magazine. Suk wrote "in that time, the one song 'Lies' satisfied all the music consumers in Korea. The 'sound' of this song was better than the normal K-Pop, and the melody development was easy for anyone to enjoy. Before 'Lies' came out, the music charts were dominated by medium tempo ballad songs." The composition was also praised, noting that "G-Dragon made this song with memorable rap and melody pieces" and admired the song for having "no useless parts". The critic concluded "'Lies' has the generation's code who wants to be a step forward in the trend but comfortable at the same time, and that wants to stand out but also somewhat mix in at the same time. This was a market that not exist before Big Bang's 'Lies', and this was the moment where the idols met this generation's emotions."

== Commercial performance ==
The song was released prior to the creation of the Gaon Music Chart, which began tracking sales in 2010. In the South Korean's online music services, it became their first number one hit, and went to top the Melon Chart's for six weeks. "Lies" also went to become the first song to win the Song of the Month award from the Cyworld Digital Music Awards for two consecutive months, as well as gathering the highest monthly sales in Cyworld's history, with over 200,000 copies sold in September. It was the best-performing song of 2007 in Cyworld, and as of 2010, the single was the ninth best-selling song of all time in Cyworld's digital chart. In 2016, "Lies" was revealed to be the second most downloaded song on Mnet.com since 2006, only after Busker Busker's "Cherry Blossom Ending."

== Legacy ==
"Lies" is recognized as the song "that made Big Bang who they are today", the ground for the following releases of the group, and the "decisive moment" that influenced K-pop idols to produce their own music by themselves. The track's electronic sound became the new music trend in Korea. It was chosen as the "Song of the Decade" by Mnet's music show M! Countdown in 2014. In 2016, "Lies" was voted the top K-pop male idol song in the past 20 years in a poll involving 2,000 people and 30 music industry experts by South Korean magazine Dong-a Ilbo. Billboard ranked the single third on their list of Top 10 Songs from the group in honor of their tenth anniversary, as well as the third greatest K-Pop chorus of the century. Sun-Times also included "Lies" in their unranked list of ten best BigBang songs. In 2014, Star News named "Lies" one of the ten best digital hit songs in South Korea's history.

"Lies" on select critic lists and polls
Publisher	Year	List	Rank	Ref.
Billboard	2017	10 Greatest K-pop Choruses of the 21st Century	3	
The Dong-a Ilbo	2016	Best male idol songs according to experts	1	
Gallup Korea	2007	Most Popular Songs of 2007	2	
Gallup Korea	2024	10 Most Beloved K-pop Songs of the 21st Century	7	
Melon	2021	Top 100 K-pop Songs of All Time	19	
Mnet	2014	Legend 100 Songs	No order	
Music Y	2014	120 Best Dance Tracks of All Time	18	
Research Panel Korea	2013	Best hit idol songs of all time	2	
Star News	2014	10 Best Digital Hit Songs in the Past 10 Years	No order	

== Accolades ==
Awards and nominations for "Lies"
Year	Organization	Award	Result	Ref.
2007	Cyworld Digital Music Awards	Song of the Month (August)	Won	
2007	Cyworld Digital Music Awards	Song of the Month (September)	Won	
2007	Mnet KM Music Festival	Song of the Year	Won	
2007	Mnet KM Music Festival	Best Male Group	Won	
2007	Mnet KM Music Festival	Best Hip Hop Song	Nominated	
2007	Golden Disc Awards	Digital Bonsang	Nominated	
2007	Golden Disc Awards	Digital Daesang	Nominated	
2008	Seoul Music Awards	Best Song Award	Won	

Music program wins (5 total)
Program	Date	Ref.
Music Bank	September 7, 2007	
Music Bank	October 5, 2007	
Music Bank	October 19, 2007	
Inkigayo	September 9, 2007	
M Countdown	September 27, 2007	

== Charts ==
=== Weekly charts ===
2012 weekly chart performance for "Lies"
Chart (2012)	Peak position
US World Digital Songs (Billboard)	24

2025 weekly chart performance for "Lies"
Chart (2025)	Peak position
South Korea (Circle)	105

2026 weekly chart performance for "Lies"
Chart (2026)	Peak position
Singapore Regional (RIAS)	15

=== Monthly charts ===
Chart (2025)	Peak position
South Korea (Circle)	114

=== Year-end charts ===
Year-end chart performance for "Lies"
Chart (2025)	Position
South Korea (Circle)	184

== Sales ==
Country	Sales
South Korea (digital)	5,000,000

== Notes ==
The lead actress in the music video was Cha Soo-yeon.
