= List of BigBang concert tours =

BigBang concert tours
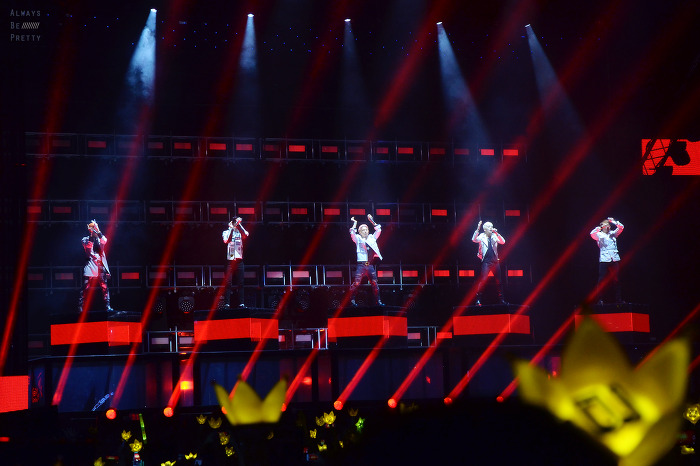
- BigBang performing during their Made World Tour, which set a record attendance of 1.5 million people at the time
- Concert tours: 11
- Concerts: 5
- Other tours: 3

South Korean boy band BigBang have embarked on eleven headlining concert tours, two of which have been worldwide, and six others in Japan. The group made their headlining debut in December 2006 through The R.E.A.L concert at Olympic Gymnastics Arena. In 2008, they embarked on their first Asian tour, The Global Warning Tour, visiting South Korea, Japan and Thailand. In 2009 and 2010, the band toured Japan on The Electric Love Tour and began annual concerts in Seoul called The Big Show. In 2011, after a two-year hiatus, the group released their EP Tonight, and planned to support the album with a world tour. However, multiple members encountered legal issues and the tour was cancelled. They visited Japan on their Love and Hope Tour, with part of the proceeds going to the 2011 Tōhoku earthquake and tsunami disaster relief.

In 2012, BigBang embarked on their first world tour, The Alive Galaxy Tour, in support of their album Alive, which marked the first time for the group to tour North America, Europe, and South America. In total, 800,000 people attended the tour worldwide. In 2013 and 2014, the members focused on their solo careers, with G-Dragon, Taeyang and Daesung undertaking solo concert tours. Meanwhile, the group toured Japan twice, on their Japan Dome Tour and Japan Dome Tour “X”, which grossed $73 million and $71 million respectively. In 2015, the group began releasing material from their third Korean-language studio album Made, and embarked on their second world tour, The Made World Tour. The concert was critically acclaimed and received rave reviews from The New York Times, The Guardian, Los Angeles Times, Grantland, and Billboard. The tour broke multiple records, becoming the most attended tour headlined by a Korean artist in history with a record attendance of 1.5 million people worldwide, and listed on Pollstar's Year-end Top 200 North American Tours for 2015. In 2016, BigBang celebrated their tenth anniversary, embarking on the 0.TO.10 tour, holding concerts in Japan, Seoul, and Hong Kong, which were attended by more than 1.1 million people. In 2017, four members of BigBang (excluding T.O.P) embarked on The Last Dance Tour, their last tour before their upcoming hiatus due to mandatory military service in Korea. Throughout their career, the band as a group and as solo acts, have performed to over 10 million people worldwide, and since their first Japanese dome tour in 2013, the band has performed to over 4.2 million fans for five consecutive years until 2017 in the country.

== Concert tours ==
Year	Title	Duration	Setlist	Attendance	Shows
2007	Want You Tour	May 15, 2007 – July 15, 2007	1. "Big Bang"; 2. "V.I.P"; 3. "Ma Girl" (Taeyang); 4. "A Fool of Tears"; 5. "We Belong Together"; 6. "Forever with You"; 7. "Try Smiling" (Daesung); 8. "Big Boy" (T.O.P); 9. "Next Day" (Seungri); 10. "She Can't Get Enough"; 11. "Dirty Cash"; 12. "This Love" (G-Dragon); 13. "La La La"; 14. "Goodbye Baby"; 15. "Shake It"; Encore: 1. "Dirty Cash"	40,000	5
The Want You Tour was BigBang's first nationwide concert tour in South Korea, in support of their debut album Bigbang Vol.1 (2006). The tour was attended by 40,000 people from five cities: Incheon, Daegu, Changwon, Jeonju, and Busan.
2008	Global Warning Tour	March 28, 2008 – June 22, 2008	—	70,000	10
The Global Warning Tour was BigBang's first concert tour in Asia, in support of their album For the World (2008). The tour visited Japan, South Korea, Thailand and was attended by 70,000 people.
2008	Stand Up Tour	October 28, 2008 – November 1, 2008 (Japan)	1. "With U"; 2. "Shake It"; 3. "How Gee"; 4. "Big Bang"; 5. "Big Boy" (T.O.P); 6. "So Beautiful"; 7. "Come Be My Lady"; 8. "Prayer" (Taeyang); 9. "Look At Me" (Taeyang); 10. "Make Love"; 11. "A Fool of Tears"; 12. "Haru Haru"; 13. "Heaven"; 14. "We Belong Together (Trance Remix)"; 15. "Snow Flower" (Seungri; Mika Nakashima cover); 16. "Remember"; 17. "Everything"; 18. "La La La"; 19. "Without You" (Danny of 1tym); 20. "Reason I close my eyes" (Danny of 1tym); 21. "Hot" (Danny of 1tym); 22. "Look at Me, Gwisun" (Daesung); 23. "Hot Issue (Intro)" (G-Dragon); 24. "This Love" (G-Dragon); 25. "A Good Man"; 26. "Oh My Baby"; 27. "Number 1 (Intro)"; 28. "Number 1"; 29. "Lies"; Encore: 1. "Last Farewell"; 2. "Always"	20,000	3
The Stand Up Tour was BigBang's first concert tour in Japan, in support of their debut Japanese-language album Number 1 (2008). The concert on November 1, 2008 in Tokyo was filmed and released on DVD in March 2010. The tour visited Osaka, Nagoya, Tokyo, and was attended by 20,000 people.
2010	Electric Love Tour	February 10, 2010 – February 17, 2010 (Japan)	1. "Gara Gara Go!!"; 2. "Top of the World"; 3. "With U"; 4. "Hallelujah" (G-Dragon, T.O.P & Taeyang); 5. "Strong Baby" (Seungri); 6. "Wedding Dress" (Taeyang); 7. "Pretended" (T.O.P); 8. "Follow Me"; 9. "Number 1"; 10. "Stylish" (Perry Remix); 11. "Fire" (2NE1); 12. "I Don't Care" (2NE1); 13. "Cotton Candy" (Daesung); 14. Daesung and Seungri medley 15. "A Good Man"; 16. "Stay"; 17. "Haru Haru"; 18. "Heartbreaker" (G-Dragon); 19. "Korean Dream" (G-Dragon & Taeyang); 20. "Rain Is Fallin'" (G-Dragon & W-inds); 21. "Koe wo Kikasete"; 22. "Lies"; 23. "Last Farewell"; Encore: 1. "How Gee"; 2. "My Heaven"	60,000	6
The Electric Love Tour was BigBang's second concert tour in Japan which visited Yokohama, Kobe, and Tokyo. The production cost for the tour was approximately ¥300 million (~US$3.3 million). Notably, BigBang performed arena shows at Yokohama Arena and Nippon Budokan only four months after their Japanese debut. The tour was attended by many Japanese celebrities. 2NE1 and W-inds appeared as special guests on the tour. The tour was attended by 60,000 people.
2011	Love and Hope Tour	May 10, 2011 – May 19, 2011 (Japan)	1. "Tonight"; 2. "Somebody to Love"; 3. "How Gee"; 4. "Number 1"; 5. "Top of the World"; 6. "V.V.I.P" (Seungri); 7. "What Can I Do" (Seungri); 8. "Where U At" (Taeyang); 9. "I'll Be There" (Taeyang); 10. "Baby Don't Cry" (Daesung); 11. "Knock Out" (GD&TOP); 12. "Oh Yeah" (GD&TOP); 13. "High High" (GD&TOP); 14. "A Fool of Tears"; 15. "Tell Me Goodbye"; 16. "Koe wo Kikasete"; 17. "Beautiful Hangover"; 18. "Cafe"; 19. "Haru Haru"; 20. "Lies"; 21. "Last Farewell"; 22. "Love Song"; 23. "Ms. Liar"; 24. "Hands Up"; Encore: 1. "Gara Gara Go!!"; 2. "My Heaven"	100,000	8
The Love and Hope Tour was BigBang's third concert tour in Japan, in support of their third Japanese studio album, Big Bang 2 (2011). The tour was previously titled the Love & Pain Tour, but was changed due to the 2011 Tōhoku earthquake and tsunami. Part of the proceeds were donated to disaster relief. The tour visited Osaka, Chiba, Nagoya, and gathered 100,000 people in attendance.
2012	Alive Galaxy Tour	March 2, 2012 – January 27, 2013	—	800,000	48
The Alive Galaxy Tour was BigBang's first worldwide concert in support of their extended play, Alive (2012), and their fourth Japanese-language studio album of the same name. The tour travelled to four continents: Asia, North America, South America and Europe. Famed choreographer and creative director Laurieann Gibson directed the show, which also consisted of a live backing band led by music director Gil-Smith II. The tour was sponsored by Samsung Galaxy and received positive reviews from Western music critics, receiving praise for the spectacle of the concert. Billboard estimated that 800,000 people worldwide attended the tour.
2013–2014	Japan Dome Tour	November 16, 2013 – January 26, 2014	—	807,000	19
The Japan Dome Tour was BigBang's fourth concert tour in Japan. The tour visited six of Japan's major concert domes, making BigBang the first foreign artists to headline their own six-dome tour. The sold-out tour was one of the country's highest-grossing concert tours of the year, and grossed over US$70.6 million from sixteen shows. Two additional shows in Korea were announced, under the name BigBang+α in Seoul. However, both shows sold-out which led to a third show being added for January 26, 2014. Winner was the opening act for the Japanese shows. The two-leg tour was attended by 807,000 people.
2014–2015	Japan Dome Tour “X”	November 15, 2014 – January 18, 2015 (Japan)	—	741,000	15
The Japan Dome Tour “X” was BigBang's fifth concert tour in Japan. The tour visited five of Japan's biggest domes and made BigBang the first foreign artist to hold dome arena concerts for two consecutive years. The production costs totalled about US$25.5 million. Frequent Madonna collaborator Jamie King, served as the creative director, while Roy Bennett was in control of the stage lighting, and Veneno produced the videos. The tour utilized a 30-meter circular 360° stage, and six 50-meter protruding stages, spreading out from the centre stage to the audience. Sophisticated technology were utilized including LED screens being installed on moving stages, and use of multi-cellular speakers ‘MLA’. iKON was the opening act for the tour. The tour drew 741,000 people in attendance.
2015–2016	Made World Tour	April 25, 2015 – March 6, 2016	—	1,500,000	66
The Made World Tour was BigBang's second worldwide concert tour, in support of their third Korean-language studio album Made (2017). The tour visited 15 countries including China, Japan, Australia, Mexico, United States, and Canada. The tour was first announced on April 1, 2015. LeRoy Bennett and Ed Burke, both having previously worked with Beyoncé and Jay-Z on their On The Run Tour, served as co-creative directors. The Band Six, led by music director Gil Smith II, joined as the live band, having regularly performed with BigBang since their first collaboration on the Alive Galaxy Tour in 2012. The tour was received universal acclaim from Western music critics, who praised their meticulous execution and the individual talent of each of the five members, and was ranked as one of the best tours of the year in The New York Times. The tour listed on Pollstar's year end list, on the Top 200 North American Tours, BigBang ranked 126 and earned 7.8 million from four shows. The final concert in Seoul was the most simultaneously live-streamed concert in Korean history, with more than 3.64 million live viewers. The tour broke numerous concert attendance records for a Korean act in foreign countries, and became the highest-attended tour in history by a Korean act gathering 1.5 million people worldwide.
2016–2017	0.TO.10	July 29, 2016 – January 22, 2017	—	1,115,500	24
0.TO.10 was BigBang's tenth anniversary concert tour. The tour visited four cities in Japan, as well as Seoul and Hong Kong. In March 2016, it was announced that BigBang will hold two special concerts at Yanmar Stadium Nagai in Osaka in July, however, a third show was added after the first two shows sold out. In June 2016, a one-off concert in South Korea was announced to be held on August 20 at Seoul World Cup Stadium marking the day after the 10th anniversary of the group's debut. The tickets were available on July 14 with all available tickets sold out in under 30 minutes. On July 18, a portion of the tickets were opened for fans in China, and all tickets sold out in nine minutes. Due to high demand, 5,000 additional seats were added despite the obstructed view. The concert in Seoul attracted 65,000 fans and became the biggest audience ever for a single headliner's concert in South Korea. On July 28, BigBang announced a dome tour in Japan to be held in November and December 2016. The concerts made BigBang the act with the biggest concert mobilization power for the year in Japan, the first time a non-Japanese act has topped the list. The final concerts were announced to be held in January 2017 in Seoul and Hong Kong. The tour was attended by more than 1.1 million people.
2017	Last Dance Tour	November 18, 2017 – December 31, 2017	—	766,000	16
The Last Dance Tour was BigBang's sixth concert tour in Japan. On August 8, 2017, it was announced that BigBang will be holding their last tour in Japan before their expected hiatus due to military conscription. On this tour, BigBang becomes the first foreign artist in Japan to hold a dome tour for the fifth consecutive year. The concert at Tokyo Dome on December 13 was screened live in more than a hundred cinemas throughout Japan. On October 19, two final concerts at Gocheok Sky Dome in Seoul on December 30 and 31 was announced. T.O.P did not perform on this tour due to his mandatory military service in South Korea.
2026–2027	XX: Cosmos World Tour	August 21, 2026 – February 28, 2027	—	—	31
The 2026 World Tour is the upcoming third world tour to celebrate the 20th anniversary of BigBang as a group, consisting of three remaining members, G-Dragon, Taeyang, and Daesung. The tour is set to begin on August 21, 2026, in Goyang, Gyeonggi, South Korea.

== Concerts ==
The following concerts were held at Olympic Gymnastics Arena in Seoul, South Korea.

Date	Title	Associated album	Set list	Gross
December 30, 2006	The R.E.A.L	Bigbang Vol.1	"Bigbang"; "V.I.P"; "Ma Girl" (Taeyang); "A Fool of Tears"; "We Belong Together" (GD&TOP, Park Bom); "Forever With You" (GD&TOP, Park Bom); "Try Smiling" (Daesung); "Big Boy" (T.O.P); "Hip-Hop Gentleman+A-yo" (G-Dragon, Taeyang, Jinusean); "Tell Me" (Jinusean cover); "Next Day" (Seungri); "She Can't Get Enough"; "Dirty Cash"; "Daesung Trot Melody"; "I Love You" (S.E.S cover); "This Love" (G-Dragon); "La La La"; "Good-Bye Baby"; "Shake It"; "Dirty Cash"	N/A
December 28–30, 2007	The G.R.E.A.T	Hot Issue; Always	"Crazy Dog" + "You in the Illusion" (Seo Taiji cover); "Shake It"; "Wild Wild West" (Will Smith cover); "Try Smiling" (Daesung); "Next Day" (Seungri); "Ma Girl" (Taeyang); "V.I.P"; "La La La"; "Fool"; "This Love" (G-Dragon); "Lies"; "Pretended" (T.O.P); "A Fool of Tears"; "But I Love U" (G-Dragon); "Last Farewell"; "Always"; "Lies"	N/A
January 30 – February 1, 2009	Big Show 2009	Stand Up; Number 1; Remember	"Haru Haru"; "Heaven"; "Strong Baby" (Seungri); "Number 1"; "Stylish"; "Only Look at Me" (Taeyang); "Pretended" (T.O.P); "Lady"; "Wonderful"; "This Love" (G-Dragon); "A Fool of Tears"; "A Good Man"; "Oh Ma Baby"; "Always"; "Make Love"; "A Big Hit" (Daesung); "La La La"; "Bigbang"; "How Gee"; "Shake It"; "Oh. Ah. Oh."; "Last Farewell"; "Sunset Glow"; "Oh My Friend"; "Lies"	$3.56 million
January 29–31, 2010	Big Show 2010	N/A	"Lies" (Hitchhiker Remix); "Gara Gara Go"; "Wonderful"; "Koe Wo Kikasete"; "Hallelujah" (G-Dragon, T.O.P & Taeyang); "Strong Baby" (Hitchhiker Remix) (Seungri); "Where U At" (Taeyang); "Pretended (T.O.P); "How Gee"; "Stylish" (Perry Remix); "Number 1"; "Cotton Candy" (Daesung); Daesung & Seungri medley; "A Good Man"; "Stay"; "Haru Haru"; "Heartbreaker" (G-Dragon); "Always"; "Heaven"; "Fool"; "Last Farewell"; "Sunset Glow"; "Lies"	N/A
February 25–27, 2011	Big Show 2011	Tonight	"Hands Up"; "Shake It"; "La La La"; "V.I.P"; "Bigbang"; "VVIP" (Seungri); "What Can I Do" (Seungri); "Where U At" (Taeyang); "I'll Be There" (Taeyang); "Baby Don’t Cry" (Daesung); "Knock Out" (GD&TOP); "Oh Yeah" (GD&TOP); "High High" (GD&TOP); "A Fool of Tears"; "Tell Me Goodbye"; "Koe Wo Kikasete"; "Wonderful"; "Tonight"; "Somebody to Love"; "Cafe"; "What is Right"; "Haru Haru (acoustic)"; "Lies"; "Last Farewell"; "Heaven"; "Always"; "Sunset Glow"	$2.8 million

== Other tours ==
Year	Title	Duration	Number of performances
2012–2016	Fantastic Babys	July 1, 2012 — July 3, 2012 (2012); February 11, 2014 — February 26, 2014 (2014); April 22, 2016 — May 29, 2016 (2016)	45
Fantastic Babys was BigBang's first fan-meeting tour for members of their official Japanese fan club. The events began in 2012 and was last held in 2016. Only G-Dragon, Sol, V.I and D-Lite attended the shows. There were 42,000, 141,000, and 280,000 fans in attendance at the 2012, 2014, and 2016 shows respectively.
2016	Made V.I.P Tour	March 11, 2016 — July 21, 2016 (China); July 22, 2016 — October 2, 2016 (Asia); October 22, 2016 (United States)	41
The Made V.I.P Tour was BigBang's first worldwide fan-meeting tour. On February 6, 2016, the first leg of the tour in Mainland China was announced. In May, additional shows were added for Hong Kong and Taiwan. On July 7, it was announced that the tour would visit Macau. On August 12, it was announced that the fan meeting will visit Honolulu, United States. On August 29 and 30, it was announced that the tour would visit Malaysia and Singapore. The tour attracted over 500,000 people in Mainland China alone, breaking BigBang's own record for the most attended tour by a foreign language act of all time in China.
2016–2017	Big Bang Special Event	November 6, 2016 — December 29, 2016 (0.to.10 Final in Japan); January 8, 2017 (0.to.10 Final in Seoul); May 27, 2017 — June 4, 2017 (Japanese fan-meeting); December 13 & 23, 2017 (Last Dance Tour)	15
BigBang Special Event was a series of fan-meeting events which began in 2016. The events were initially held alongside their tenth anniversary concert tour 0.TO.10. On February 14, 2017, it was announced that BigBang will hold fan meetings in 2017, marking the band's first show without T.O.P after his enlistment in February 2017. On October 5, 2017, two shows were announced to be held in conjunction with their sixth Japanese concert tour, the Last Dance Tour.

== See also ==
- List of BigBang solo concert tours
