= Big Bang Special Event =

2016–17 concert tour by Big Bang

- Fan meeting tour by Big Bang
- The cover of 2017 events
- Location: Asia
- Start date: November 6, 2016
- End date: December 23, 2017
- Legs: 3
- No. of shows: 15

Big Bang concert chronology
- Made V.I.P Tour (2016); Big Bang Special Event (2016–2017)

Big Bang Special Event is a series of fan meeting events by Big Bang, which began in 2016 with 8 shows in Japan and South Korea, held alongside their 10th anniversary tour 0.TO.10. All members attended the first leg of the tour, however T.O.P missed all shows of the second leg, due to his two-year mandatory military service in South Korea.

== Events ==
=== 2016 Event ===
The band held fan meetings alongside their Japanese tour 0.TO.10, under the name BIGBANG SPECIAL EVENT -HAJIMARI NO SAYONARA, with seven events. The shows were an hour long, and included a talk session with the five members and a live performance, each scheduled to be held before every dome concert. In December 2016, a show was announced in South Korea, and was held on the same day of the last concert at Gocheok Sky Dome.

=== 2017 Events ===
On February 14, 2017, it was announced that BigBang will hold fan meetings in Japan from the end of May to early June. This was the first event without T.O.P after his enlistment in February 2017, and the second time BigBang held fan meetings inside dome arenas. The event was approximately two hours long, with four talk sessions, a game corner and live performances.

October 5, 2017, as a part of their Last Dance Tour, YGEX announced two fans meeting to be held on Tokyo Dome and Kyocera Dome.

== Set list ==
This set list is representative of the shows in 2017.

1. "Koe o Kikasete"
2. "Strong Baby"
3. "Candle"
4. "Always"
5. "Loser"
6. "Bang Bang Bang"
7. "If You"
8. "Bad Boy"
9. "Fxxk It"
10. "Feeling"
11. "Fantastic Baby"
12. "We Like 2 Party"
13. "Bae Bae"
14. "Last Dance"

== Dates ==
List of concert dates
Date	City	Country	Venue	Attendance
November 6, 2016	Tokyo	Japan	Tokyo Dome	221,000
November 20, 2016	Fukuoka	Japan	Fukuoka Dome	221,000
November 26, 2016	Osaka	Japan	Kyocera Dome	221,000
December 4, 2016	Nagoya	Japan	Vantelin Dome Nagoya	221,000
December 11, 2016	Fukuoka	Japan	Fukuoka Dome	221,000
December 28, 2016	Osaka	Japan	Kyocera Dome	221,000
December 29, 2016	Osaka	Japan	Kyocera Dome	221,000
January 8, 2017	Seoul	South Korea	Gocheok Sky Dome	35,000
May 27, 2017	Fukuoka	Japan	Fukuoka Dome	250,000
May 30, 2017	Tokyo	Japan	Tokyo Dome	250,000
May 31, 2017	Tokyo	Japan	Tokyo Dome	250,000
June 3, 2017	Osaka	Japan	Kyocera Dome	250,000
June 4, 2017	Osaka	Japan	Kyocera Dome	250,000
December 13, 2017	Tokyo	Japan	Tokyo Dome	100,000
December 23, 2017	Osaka	Japan	Kyocera Dome	100,000
Total				606,000
