= Global Warning Tour =

2008 concert tour by Big Bang

- Continental tour by Big Bang
- Promotional poster for the tour
- Location: Asia
- Associated album: For the World
- Start date: March 28, 2008
- End date: June 22, 2008
- No. of shows: 10

Big Bang concert chronology
- Want You Tour (2007); Global Warning Tour (2008); Stand Up Tour (2008)

The Global Warning Tour was the first Asian concert tour by South Korean boy band Big Bang. The tour began on March 28, 2008, in Tokyo, Japan and concluded on June 22, 2008, in Seoul, South Korea.

== Set list ==
1. "Intro"
2. "Unknown Number"
3. "Shake It"
4. "Big Bang"
5. "How Gee"
6. "Big Boy" (T.O.P)
7. "Prayer" (Taeyang)
8. "Only Look at Me" (Taeyang)
9. "A Fool of Tears"
10. "Fool"
11. Dance Performace (Seungri)
12. "Crazy Dog" + "You in the Illusion" (Seo Taiji cover)
13. "With U"
14. "Dirty Cash" (Remix)
15. "V.I.P"
16. "La La La" (Remix)
17. "Look at Me, Gwisun" (Daesung)
18. "This Love" (G-Dragon)
19. "But I Love U" (G-Dragon)
20. "We Belong Together" (Remix)
21. "Lies" (Remix)
22. "Last Farewell"
23. "Always"

== Tour dates ==
Date	City	Country	Venue	Attendance
March 28, 2008	Tokyo	Japan	JCB Hall	10,000
March 29, 2008 (two shows)	Tokyo	Japan	JCB Hall	10,000
April 12, 2008	Busan	South Korea	Busan Exhibition and Convention Center	50,000 (Note: The attendance is combined from the shows held in South Korea from 12, April 27 & 11, May 24 & 21, June 22, 2008, respectively.)
April 27, 2008	Gwangju	South Korea	Kim Daejung Convention Center	50,000
May 11, 2008	Wonju	South Korea	Wonju Chiak Gymnasium	50,000
May 24, 2008	Daegu	South Korea	EXCO Exhibition & Convention Center	50,000
June 7, 2008	Bangkok	Thailand	Huamark Indoor Stadium	10,000
June 21, 2008	Seoul	South Korea	Jamsil Indoor Stadium	
June 22, 2008	Seoul	South Korea	Jamsil Indoor Stadium	
Total				70,000
