= X Tour =

X Tour may refer to:

- x Tour (Ed Sheeran), 2015
- The X Tour (Christina Aguilera), 2019
- "X Tour", Ambassador 21, 2011
- "The X-Tour", see Spock's Beard discography
- Dyro & Bassjackers Present X Tour, Dyro, 2014
- KylieX2008, 2008

== See also ==
- Japan Dome Tour X, a concert tour by Big Bang
- X (disambiguation)
