= Japan Dome Tour X =

2014–15 concert tour by Big Bang

Japan Dome Tour “X”
- National tour by Big Bang
- Location: Japan
- Start date: November 15, 2014
- End date: January 18, 2015
- No. of shows: 15
- Box office: $70.39 million ($93.49 million in 2024 dollars)

Big Bang concert chronology
- Japan Dome Tour (2013–14); Japan Dome Tour “X” (2014–15); Made World Tour (2015–16)

The Japan Dome Tour “X” was the fifth concert tour in Japan and eighth overall by South Korean boy band Big Bang. The tour began on November 15, 2014 in Nagoya, and concluded on January 18, 2015 in Osaka. The tour made BigBang the first foreign artist to hold five dome arena concerts for two consecutive years. They gathered more than one million Japanese fans in 2014.

== Development ==
A total of about 3 billion Japanese Yen (~25.5 million USD) was used to produce the stages. Well known production staff also joined the tour, such as Jamie King, the tour director who previously worked with Michael Jackson, Madonna and Britney Spears. Roy Bennett was in control of the stage lighting, while Veneno took charge of the tour videos. The tour utilized a 30-meter center stage, as well as six 50-meter protruding stages, spreading out from the center stage to the audience like the spokes of a wheel. A large number of stage lighting and equipment was imported from countries outside Japan. High-tech equipment, including the LED screens, were set up on the protruding stages, while the multi-cellular speakers ‘MLA,’ presented high quality concerts for the audience.

== Set list ==
This set list is from BIGBANG Japan Dome Tour 2014～2015 [X] (DVD/Blu-ray) - Deluxe Edition.

1. "Fantastic Baby"
2. "Tonight"
3. "Stupid Liar"
4. "Blue"
5. "Haru Haru"
6. "Gara Gara Go!"
7. "Top of the World" + "Number 1"
8. "Knock Out" (GD&TOP)
9. "High High" (GD&TOP)
10. "Bad Boy"
11. "Tell Me Goodbye"
12. "Cafe"
13. "Lies"
14. "Love Song"
15. "Good Boy" (GDxTAEYANG)
16. "Hands Up"
17. "Feeling"
18. "My Heaven"
19. "Let Me Hear Your Voice"

Encore

1. "Last Farewell"
2. Seungri DJ Time:
  1. "Strong Baby" (Seungri)
  2. "Doom Dada" (T.O.P)
  3. "Ringa Linga" (Taeyang)
  4. "Crooked" (G-Dragon)
  5. "Look at me, Gwisun" (Daesung)
3. "Fantastic Baby"

== Tour dates ==
List of concerts, showing date, city, venue, and tickets sold
Date	City	Venue	Guests	Attendance
November 15, 2014	Nagoya	Nagoya Dome	iKon	741,000
November 16, 2014	Nagoya	Nagoya Dome	iKon	741,000
November 20, 2014	Osaka	Kyocera Dome	iKon	741,000
November 21, 2014	Osaka	Kyocera Dome	iKon	741,000
November 22, 2014	Osaka	Kyocera Dome	iKon	741,000
November 23, 2014	Osaka	Kyocera Dome	iKon	741,000
December 6, 2014	Fukuoka	Fukuoka Dome	iKon	741,000
December 7, 2014	Fukuoka	Fukuoka Dome	iKon	741,000
December 20, 2014	Sapporo	Sapporo Dome	iKon	741,000
December 25, 2014	Tokyo	Tokyo Dome	iKon	741,000
December 26, 2014	Tokyo	Tokyo Dome	iKon	741,000
December 27, 2014	Tokyo	Tokyo Dome	iKon	741,000
January 16, 2015	Osaka	Kyocera Dome	iKon	741,000
January 17, 2015	Osaka	Kyocera Dome	iKon	741,000
January 18, 2015	Osaka	Kyocera Dome	iKon	741,000

== Personnel ==
Main

- Tour organizer: Avex Group, YG Entertainment
- Executive producers – Yang Hyun-suk (YG Entertainment), Max Matsuura (Avex Group)
- General producers – Katsumi Kuroiwa (Avex Group)
- Tour producer - Veneno
- Tour director – Jamie King
- Stylist – Yuni Choi, Kyung Mi Kim, Sharon Park
- Hair – Tae Kyun Kim, Sang Hee Baek, So Yeon Lee
- Make-up – Yun Kyoung Kim, Mi Sug Shin, Jun Hee Lee
- Lighting director – Roy Bennett

Band

- BigBang (G-Dragon, T.O.P, Taeyang, Daesung, Seungri) – Lead vocals
- Gil Smith II (Music Director/Keyboard 1)
- Omar Dominick Jr. (AMD/Bass)
- Dante Jackson (Keyboard 2)
- Justin Lyons (Guitar)
- Bennie Rodgers II (Drums/Percussions)
- Adrian "AP" Porter (Pro Tools Programmer)

Dancers

- HI-TECH (Heeyun Kim, Jung Heon Park, Young Sang Lee Sung Min Cho, Han Sol Lee, Byoung Gon Jung, Woo Ryun Jung, Young Deuk Kwon, Young Don Kwon)
- CRAZY (Jung Hee Kim, Ah Yeon Won, Eun Young Park, Min Jung Kim, Hee Yun Kim, Sae Bom Choi, Jung In Bae, Hye Jin Choi, Hyo Jung Bae, Ji Won Lee, Jae Hee Ryu, Ji Young Yoo)
