= Fantastic Babys =

Concert tour by Big Bang

- Fan meeting tour by BigBang
- The official logo of Big Bang VIP fan club in Japan
- Location: Japan
- Start date: July 1, 2012
- End date: May 29, 2016
- Legs: 3
- No. of shows: 45

BigBang concert chronology
- Fantastic Babys (2012–2016); Made V.I.P Tour (2016)

Fantastic Babys is a special fan meeting for BigBang's fan club in Japan. It started in 2012, with four shows. The last event was held in 2016. All the members of BigBang including, G-Dragon, Sol, V.I and D-Lite attended all shows, except T.O.P who missed all shows, due to other schedules.

== Events ==
=== 2016 Event ===
In early 2016, YG Entertainment announced that BigBang will hold fan meeting events for the Japanese fan club in April, visiting four cities Kobe, Fukuoka, Nagoya and Chiba with 27 shows in total. It was announced that T.O.P will miss the fan meeting due to his movie filming. The fan meeting ended with great success after 280,000 fans came to the shows.

== Dates ==
List of concert dates
Date	City	Venue	Attendance
July 1, 2012 (two shows)	Kobe	World Memorial Hall	42,000
July 3, 2012 (two shows)	Tokyo	Nippon Budokan	42,000
February 11, 2014 (two shows)	Fukuoka	Marine Messe Fukuoka	141,000
February 18, 2014 (two shows)	Yokohama	Yokohama Arena	141,000
February 19, 2014 (two shows)	Yokohama	Yokohama Arena	141,000
February 22, 2014 (two shows)	Kobe	World Memorial Hall	141,000
February 23, 2014 (two shows)	Kobe	World Memorial Hall	141,000
February 25, 2014 (two shows)	Nagoya	NGK Insulators Hall	141,000
February 26, 2014 (two shows)	Nagoya	NGK Insulators Hall	141,000
April 22, 2016	Kobe	World Memorial Hall	280,000
April 23, 2016 (two shows)	Kobe	World Memorial Hall	280,000
April 24, 2016 (two shows)	Kobe	World Memorial Hall	280,000
April 27, 2016 (two shows)	Fukuoka	Marine Messe Fukuoka	280,000
April 29, 2016 (two shows)	Nagoya	NGK Insulators Hall	280,000
April 30, 2016 (two shows)	Nagoya	NGK Insulators Hall	280,000
May 1, 2016	Nagoya	NGK Insulators Hall	280,000
May 3, 2016 (two shows)	Chiba	Makuhari Messe Exhibition Hall 9-11	280,000
May 4, 2016 (two shows)	Chiba	Makuhari Messe Exhibition Hall 9-11	280,000
May 5, 2016 (two shows)	Chiba	Makuhari Messe Exhibition Hall 9-11	280,000
May 14, 2016 (two shows)	Chiba	Makuhari Messe Exhibition Hall 9-11	280,000
May 15, 2016 (two shows)	Chiba	Makuhari Messe Exhibition Hall 9-11	280,000
May 27, 2016	Kobe	World Memorial Hall	280,000
May 28, 2016 (two shows)	Kobe	World Memorial Hall	280,000
May 29, 2016 (two shows)	Kobe	World Memorial Hall	280,000
Total			463,000

== DVD ==
BIGBANG Fanclub Event 2014 'Fantastic Babys'

Video by BigBang
- Released: February 18, 2015
- Recorded: February 2, 2014
- Length: 133 minutes
- Language: Japanese
- Label: YGEx

Bigbang Fanclub Event 2014 'Fantastic Babys' is a live DVD & Blu-ray by South Korean band Big Bang, released on February 18, 2015, in Japan only available for fans with VIP membership. The DVD/Blu-ray was filmed during the band's fan meeting in Yokohama Arena. The tour visited 4 cities with 14 shows in total.

=== Track listing ===
No.	Title	Length
1.	"Games"
2.	"Hands Up"
3.	"Gara Gara Go!"
4.	"HaruHaru -Japanese Version-"
5.	"Bad Boy"
6.	"Fantastic Baby"
7.	"My Heaven"
8.	"Koe o Kikasete"
