= Japan Dome Tour =

2013–14 concert tour by Big Bang

- Continental tour by Big Bang
- Location: Japan; South Korea
- Start date: November 16, 2013
- End date: January 26, 2014
- Legs: 2
- No. of shows: 16 in Japan; 3 in South Korea; 19 total
- Box office: $70.6 million ($95.3 million in 2024 dollars)

Big Bang concert chronology
- Alive Galaxy Tour (2012–13); Japan Dome Tour (2013–14); Japan Dome Tour "X" (2014–15)

The Japan Dome Tour was the fourth concert tour in Japan and seventh overall by South Korean boy band Big Bang. The tour visited six of Japan's major concert domes, making BigBang the first foreign artists to headline their own six-dome tour. The tour was one of the country's highest-grossing concert tours of the year, and grossed over US$70.6 million from sixteen shows, with all of the tickets from the tour being sold out.

== Concert ==
The concert kicked off with the Japanese version of BigBang's "Haru Haru", and the song was followed by "Blue", and "Bad Boy", and then BigBang's Japanese debut single, "Gara Gara Go". As the scale of the stadium is immense, BigBang used a flying stage that enables the entire stage to move, while also using a moving car that allows all five members to go closer to the fans. The three-hour-long concert encompassed more than 30 songs, including encore and re-encore.

== Big Bang+α in Seoul ==
On November 28, 2013, two shows in Seoul were announced, under the name BigBang+α in Seoul. Both shows sold out within seconds after tickets were released, which led to a third show being added due to high demand.

== Commercial performance ==
The group broke the record by generating approximately ₩74.8 billion won (US$70.6 million) in ticket sales from their Japan Dome Tour, marking the highest amount achieved by a foreign artist in Japan at the time.

== Set list ==
This set list is representative of their first show in Saitama.

1. "Haru Haru"
2. "Blue"
3. "Bad Boy"
4. "Gara Gara Go!"
5. "Hands Up"
6. "Let's Talk About Love" (Seungri)
7. "Gotta Talk to You" (Seungri)
8. "What Can I Do" (Seungri)
9. "Wings" (Daesung)
10. "Joyful" (Daesung)
11. "Tell Me Goodbye"
12. "Love Song"
13. "La La La"
14. "BIGBANG"
15. "Shake It"
16. "Only Look At Me" (Taeyang)
17. "Wedding Dress" (Taeyang)
18. "Ringa Linga" (Taeyang)
19. "Crayon" (G-Dragon)
20. "Crooked" (G-Dragon)
21. "Turn It Up" (T.O.P)
22. "Doom Dada" (T.O.P)
23. "Tonight"
24. "Feeling"
25. "Last Farewell"
26. "Fantastic Baby"
27. "Lies"
28. "My Heaven"

Encore

29. "Sunset Glow"
30. "Koe o Kikasete"
31. "Fantastic Baby"
32. "Feeling"
33. "Bad Boy"

== Tour dates ==
List of concerts, showing date, city, venue, and tickets sold
Date	City	Country	Venue	Guests	Attendance
November 16, 2013	Saitama	Japan	Seibu Dome	Winner	771,000
November 17, 2013	Saitama	Japan	Seibu Dome	Winner	771,000
November 29, 2013	Osaka	Japan	Kyocera Dome	Winner	771,000
November 30, 2013	Osaka	Japan	Kyocera Dome	Winner	771,000
December 1, 2013	Osaka	Japan	Kyocera Dome	Winner	771,000
December 7, 2013	Fukuoka	Japan	Fukuoka Dome	Winner	771,000
December 8, 2013	Fukuoka	Japan	Fukuoka Dome	Winner	771,000
December 14, 2013	Nagoya	Japan	Nagoya Dome	Winner	771,000
December 15, 2013	Nagoya	Japan	Nagoya Dome	Winner	771,000
December 19, 2013	Tokyo	Japan	Tokyo Dome	Winner	771,000
December 20, 2013	Tokyo	Japan	Tokyo Dome	Winner	771,000
December 21, 2013	Tokyo	Japan	Tokyo Dome	Winner	771,000
January 4, 2014	Sapporo	Japan	Sapporo Dome	Winner	771,000
January 11, 2014	Osaka	Japan	Kyocera Dome	Winner	771,000
January 12, 2014	Osaka	Japan	Kyocera Dome	Winner	771,000
January 13, 2014	Osaka	Japan	Kyocera Dome	Winner	771,000
BigBang+α in Seoul
January 24, 2014	Seoul	South Korea	Olympic Gymnastics Arena	—	36,000
January 25, 2014	Seoul	South Korea	Olympic Gymnastics Arena	—	36,000
January 26, 2014	Seoul	South Korea	Olympic Gymnastics Arena	—	36,000
Total					807,000

== Personnel ==
Credits are adapted from BigBang's Japanese DVD BIGBANG JAPAN DOME TOUR 2013~2014.

Main

- Tour organizer: Avex Group, YG Entertainment
- Executive producers – Yang Hyun-suk (YG Entertainment), Max Matsuura (Avex Group)
- Tour producer – Ryoichi Eise
- Tour director – Jung Min Byun
- Stage producer – "Joseph" Woo Ki Kwon
- Stylist – Yuni Choi, Kyung Mi Kim, Sharon Park
- Hair – Tae Kyun Kim, Sang Hee Baek, So Yeon Lee
- Make-up – Yun Kyoung Kim, Mi Sug Shin, Jun Hee Lee
- Visual director – Eun Gee (YG Entertainment)
- Choreographers – Jae Wook Lee

Band

- BigBang (G-Dragon, T.O.P, Taeyang, Daesung, Seungri) – Lead vocals
- Gil Smith II (Music Director/Keyboard 1)
- Omar Dominick (AMD/Bass)
- Dante Jackson (Keyboard 2)
- Justin Lyons (Guitar)
- Bennie Rodgers II (Drums)
- Adrian "AP" Porter (Pro Tools Programmer)

Dancers

- HI-TECH (Jung Heon Park, Young Sang Lee Sung Min Cho, Han Sol Lee, Byoung Gon Jung, Woo Ryun Jung, Young Deuk Kwon, Young Don Kwon)
- CRAZY (Jung Hee Kim, Ah Yeon Won, Eun Young Park, Min Jung Kim, Hee Yun Kim, Sae Bom Choi, Jung In Bae, Hye Jin Choi, Hyo Jung Bae, Ji Won Lee, Jae Hee Ryu, Ji Young Yoo)
