= 0.TO.10 =

2016–17 concert tour by Big Bang

- Continental tour by BigBang
- South Korean promotional handbill
- Location: Asia
- Start date: July 29, 2016
- End date: January 22, 2017
- No. of shows: 24

BigBang concert chronology
- Made World Tour (2015–16); 0.TO.10 (2016–17); Last Dance Tour (2017)

0.TO.10 was the tenth concert tour by South Korean boy band BigBang that was held to celebrate the group's tenth anniversary. The tour visited Japan, South Korea and Hong Kong from July 2016 to January 2017. The shows were live-streamed through theatres in Japan, Tencent QQ in China and Naver's V app. BigBang held 24 concerts in six cities, which attracted more than 1.1 million fans.

0.TO.10 would be the group's final tour to feature member T.O.P due to his military enlistment in 2017, as well as his eventual departure from the group in 2023.

== History ==
=== Japan ===
In March 2016, it was announced that BigBang will hold a series of special 10th anniversary concerts in Yanmar Stadium Nagai in Osaka, with two shows to be held on July 30 and 31, with 110,000 fans in attendance. More than 450,000 people applied for the tickets, which lead to a third show being added on July 29. The concert on July 30 aired live through 148 theaters across Japan's 47 prefectures. A total of 165,000 tickets were sold from the three sold-out shows.

On July 28, YG announced a fourth Japan dome tour by the group. They broke their own record by being the first foreign act to hold a Japanese dome tour for four consecutive years. Due to overwhelming demand, three shows were added at Kyocera Dome as encore concerts, to bring the total expected attendance to 781,500 fans. On September 7, YGEX announced that the tour is the final project of their 0.TO.10 celebrations. Over 1 million fans applied for the tickets.

The concerts made BigBang the act with the biggest concert mobilization power for the year in Japan, the first time a non-Japanese act has topped the list.

=== South Korea ===
In June 2016, a concert in South Korea was announced to be held on August 20 at Seoul World Cup Stadium in Seoul, marking the 10th anniversary of the group's debut. The tickets were available on July 14 on Auction, with all available tickets sold out in under 30 minutes. On July 18, a portion of the tickets were opened for fans in China, and all tickets sold out in nine minutes, with total log-ins posting 1.98 million with maximum simultaneous log-ins of 1.58 million on Weying's ticket-selling platform. After the huge demand for the tickets, 5,000 additional seats were added despite the poor view. The concert attracted 65,000 fans and became the biggest audience ever for a solo concert in the South Korea.

The paid live-stream of the concert was available through China's online platform Tencent, and Naver's V app in Korea. As of August 24, The total people streaming the concert was over 3 million. The concert generated over ₩10 billion in revenue ($8.8 million). Encore concerts were announced to be held on January 7 and 8, 2017 at the Gocheok Sky Dome.

=== Fan-meetings ===
Along with the tour, BigBang held a special event with their fans, under the name BigBang Special Event - Hajimari No Sayonara, with seven shows in Japan and one show in South Korea.

== Set lists ==
Japan
1. "My Heaven"
2. "We Like 2 Party"
3. "Hands Up"
4. "Bad Boy"
5. "Loser"
6. "Gara Gara Go!"
7. "Let's Talk About Love" + "Strong Baby" (Seungri)
8. "Wings" + "Look at Me, Gwisun" (Daesung)
9. "Joyful" (Daesung ft. Seungri)
10. "Heartbreaker" + "Crayon" (G-Dragon)
11. "High High" (GD & TOP)
12. "Good Boy" (GD X TAEYANG)
13. "Doom Dada" (T.O.P)
14. "Eyes, Nose, Lips" (Taeyang)
15. "Only Look at Me" + "Ringa Linga" (Taeyang)
16. "If You"
17. "Haru Haru"
18. "Bang Bang Bang"
19. "Fantastic Baby"
20. "Sober"

Encore

1. "Last Farewell" + "Sunset Glow" + "Lies"
2. "Koe o Kikasete"
3. "Feeling"

Re-encore

1. "Bae Bae"
- On the July 29 show, GD & TOP sang "Knock Out" instead of "High High".
South Korea
1. "Heaven"
2. "We Like 2 Party"
3. "Hands Up"
4. "Bad Boy"
5. "Loser"
6. "Feeling"
7. "Let's Talk About Love" + "Strong Baby" (Seungri)
8. "Wings" + "Look at Me, Gwisoon" (Daesung)
9. "Crooked" (Daesung & Seungri cover G-Dragon)
10. "Heartbreaker" + "Crayon" (G-Dragon)
11. "High High" (GD&TOP)
12. "Good Boy" (GDxTAEYANG)
13. "Act Like Nothing's Wrong" + "Doom Dada" (T.O.P)
14. "Eyes, Nose, Lips" (Taeyang)
15. "Only Look at Me" + "Ringa Linga" (Taeyang)
16. "If You"
17. "Haru Haru"
18. "Bang Bang Bang"
19. "Fantastic Baby"
20. "Sober"

Encore

1. "Last Farewell" + "Sunset Glow" + "Lies"
2. "Always"

Re-encore

1. "Bae Bae"
- In the 2017 shows, Big Bang performed "Fxxk It" and "Last Dance" instead of "Feeling" and "Haru Haru", and "Girlfriend" as a part of Re-encore.

== Dates ==
List of concerts, showing date, city, venue, and tickets sold
Date	City	Country	Venue	Special guests	Attendance
July 29, 2016	Osaka	Japan	Yanmar Stadium Nagai	Choice37	165,000
July 30, 2016	Osaka	Japan	Yanmar Stadium Nagai	Choice37	165,000
July 31, 2016	Osaka	Japan	Yanmar Stadium Nagai	Choice37	165,000
August 20, 2016	Seoul	South Korea	Seoul World Cup Stadium	Psy	65,000
November 5, 2016	Tokyo	Japan	Tokyo Dome	—N/a	781,500
November 6, 2016	Tokyo	Japan	Tokyo Dome	—N/a	781,500
November 19, 2016	Fukuoka	Japan	Fukuoka Dome	—N/a	781,500
November 20, 2016	Fukuoka	Japan	Fukuoka Dome	—N/a	781,500
November 25, 2016	Osaka	Japan	Kyocera Dome	—N/a	781,500
November 26, 2016	Osaka	Japan	Kyocera Dome	—N/a	781,500
November 27, 2016	Osaka	Japan	Kyocera Dome	—N/a	781,500
December 2, 2016	Nagoya	Japan	Nagoya Dome	—N/a	781,500
December 3, 2016	Nagoya	Japan	Nagoya Dome	—N/a	781,500
December 4, 2016	Nagoya	Japan	Nagoya Dome	—N/a	781,500
December 9, 2016	Fukuoka	Japan	Fukuoka Dome	—N/a	781,500
December 10, 2016	Fukuoka	Japan	Fukuoka Dome	—N/a	781,500
December 11, 2016	Fukuoka	Japan	Fukuoka Dome	—N/a	781,500
December 27, 2016	Osaka	Japan	Kyocera Dome	—N/a	781,500
December 28, 2016	Osaka	Japan	Kyocera Dome	—N/a	781,500
December 29, 2016	Osaka	Japan	Kyocera Dome	—N/a	781,500
January 7, 2017	Seoul	South Korea	Gocheok Sky Dome	—N/a	64,000
January 8, 2017	Seoul	South Korea	Gocheok Sky Dome	—N/a	64,000
January 21, 2017	Hong Kong	China	East Kowloon Cruise Terminal Outdoor Activities Square	Choice37	40,000
January 22, 2017	Hong Kong	China	East Kowloon Cruise Terminal Outdoor Activities Square	Choice37	40,000
Total					1,115,500

== Personnel ==
Lead performer

- Vocals, dance and director: Big Bang (G-Dragon, T.O.P, Taeyang, Seungri and Daesung)

Band

- Music director/Keyboard 1: Gil Smith II
- AMD/Bass: Omar Dominick
- Drums: Bennie Rodgers II
- Keyboard 2: Dante Jackson
- Guitar: Justin Lyons
- Pro Tools Programmer: Adrian "AP" Porter

Dancers

- HI-TECH: Park Jung Heon, Jung Byoung Gon, Kwon Young Deuk, Kwon Young Don, Lee Young Sang, You Chung Jae,
- CRAZY: Won Ah Yeon, Park Eun Young, Kim Min Jung, Kim Hee Yeon, Park Eun Chong, Kim Se Jin.

Music department, visual & concert

- Concert director: BigBang, Lee Jae Wook
- Live performance director: Jeung Chi Young
- Choreographer director: Lee Jae Wook
- Visual director, stylist: Gee Eun

== DVD and Blu-ray ==
=== BIGBANG10 The Concert : 0.TO.10 In Japan ===
BIGBANG10 The Concert : 0.TO.10 In Japan

Video by BigBang
- Released: November 2, 2016
- Recorded: July 31, 2016
- Language: Japanese
- Label: YGEX

BIGBANG10 The Concert : 0.TO.10 In Japan is a live DVD & Blu-ray by the group, released on November 2, 2016, in Japan. The DVD/Blu-ray was filmed during the group final live performance in Yanmar Stadium Nagai, which attracted 55,000 fans.

The DVD includes a total of the 30 songs that were sung live in the concert of 0.TO.10, including a multi angle camera for each member, a special features section, behind the scenes of the tour, and a collection of best stages. The DVD also contains the movie Made that was released in cinemas on June 30, 2016, including special interviews that have been cut from the film.

==== Track listing ====
Deluxe Edition
No.	Title	Length
1.	"Games"
2.	"-OPENING MOVIE-"
3.	"My Heaven + We Like 2 Party"
4.	"Hands Up"
5.	"Bad Boy"
6.	"Loser"
7.	"ガラガラ GO!!"
8.	"Let's Talk About Love + Strong Baby"
9.	"Wings + ナルバキスン (Look at me, Gwisun)"
10.	"Joyful"
11.	"Heartbreaker + Crayon"
12.	"High High"
13.	"Good Boy"
14.	"Doom Dada"
15.	"Eyes, Nose, Lips"
16.	"Only Look at Me + Ringa Linga"
17.	"If You"
18.	"Haru Haru"
19.	"Bang Bang Bang"
20.	"Fantastic Baby"
21.	"Sober"
22.	"ENCORE MOVIE"
23.	"Last Farewell + Sunset Glow + Lies"
24.	"声をきかせて (Koe o Kikasete)"
25.	"Feeling"
26.	"Bae Bae"
27.	"BEHIND THE STAGE OF BIGBANG10 THE CONCERT:0.TO.10 IN JAPAN"
28.	"BIGBANG10 THE CONCERT:0.TO.10 in JAPAN[SPECIAL FEATURES]"
29.	"BIGBANG10 THE CONCERT:0.TO.10 in JAPAN[COLLECTION OF BEST STAGE]"
30.	"BIGBANG10 THE CONCERT:0.TO.10 in JAPAN[MULTI ANGLE]"
31.	"BIGBANG10 THE MOVIE BIGBANG MADE"
32.	"BIGBANG10 THE MOVIE BIGBANG MADE[MOVIE TALK]"
33.	"BIGBANG10 THE MOVIE BIGBANG MADE[SPECIAL INTERVIEW(DELETED SCENE)]"
34.	"BIGBANG10 THE MOVIE BIGBANG MADE[TRAILER]"

==== Charts ====
BIGBANG10 The Concert : 0.TO.10 In Japan charted 1st on Oricon Daily Chart upon its release. In the first week it debuted at number one on the Oricon DVD Chart, selling 35,553 copies, making it fifth DVD released by the group to debut at number-one in Japan. The Blu-ray edition also debuted at number one and became the fifth Blu-ray to top Oricon Blu-ray Chart, selling 15,218 copies in the first week.

Chart (2014)	Peak position
Oricon Music DVD Chart	1
Oricon Music Blu-ray Chart	1

==== Sales ====
Chart	Sales
Japan Oricon chart	68,958

=== BIGBANG10 The Concert : 0.TO.10 In Seoul ===
BIGBANG10 The Concert : 0.TO.10 In Seoul is a live DVD by the group, released on February 8, 2017, in Japan, and February 10 in South Korea. The DVD was filmed during the group 10th anniversary concert on August 20, 2016, in Seoul World Cup Stadium, which attracted 65,000 fans, and became the biggest audience gathered for a solo concert in the South Korea.

The DVD includes a total of the 30 songs that were sung live in the concert of 0.TO.10, including a multi angle camera for each member for five songs.

==== Track listing ====
CD
No.	Title	Length
1.	"Games"
2.	"My Heaven"
3.	"We Like 2 Party"
4.	"Hands Up"
5.	"Bad Boy"
6.	"Loser"
7.	"Let's Talk About Love"
8.	"Strong Baby"
9.	"Wings"
10.	"Look at me, Gwisun"
11.	"Crooked"
12.	"Heartbreaker"
13.	"Crayon"
14.	"High High"
15.	"Good Boy"
16.	"Pretended"
17.	"Doom Dada"
18.	"Eyes, Nose, Lips"
19.	"Only Look at Me"
20.	"Ringa Linga"
21.	"If You"
22.	"Haru Haru"
23.	"Bang Bang Bang"
24.	"Fantastic Baby"
25.	"Sober"
26.	"Last Farewell"
27.	"Sunset Glow"
28.	"Lies"
29.	"Always"
30.	"Bae Bae"

=== BIGBANG10 The Concert : 0.TO.10 -The Final- ===
BIGBANG10 The Concert : 0.TO.10 -The Final- is a live DVD and Blu-ray by the group, released on March 22, 2017, in Japan. The DVD/Blu-ray was filmed during the group final live performance in Japan at Kyocera Dome. The tour in Japan mobilized 781,500 people in 16 shows in four cities.

The DVD/Blu-ray includes a documentary film about the tour final, special features, collection of best moments, and the fan-meeting special event "HAJIMARI NO SAYONARA".

==== Track listing ====
CD
No.	Title	Length
1.	"Games"
2.	"My Heaven"
3.	"We Like 2 Party"
4.	"Hands Up"
5.	"Bad Boy"
6.	"Loser"
7.	"Let's Talk About Love"
8.	"Strong Baby"
9.	"Old Diary"
10.	"Look at me, Gwisun"
11.	"Joyful (Daesung & Seungri)"
12.	"Heartbreaker"
13.	"Crayon"
14.	"High High"
15.	"Good Boy"
16.	"Pretended"
17.	"Doom Dada"
18.	"Eyes, Nose, Lips"
19.	"Only Look at Me"
20.	"Ringa Linga"
21.	"If You"
22.	"Haru Haru"
23.	"Bang Bang Bang"
24.	"Fantastic Baby"
25.	"Sober"
26.	"Last Farewell"
27.	"Feelings"
28.	"Lies"
29.	"Koe o Kikasete"
30.	"Bae Bae"

== Gallery ==
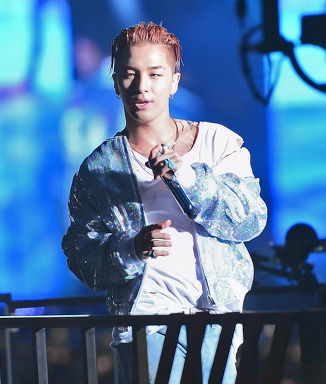

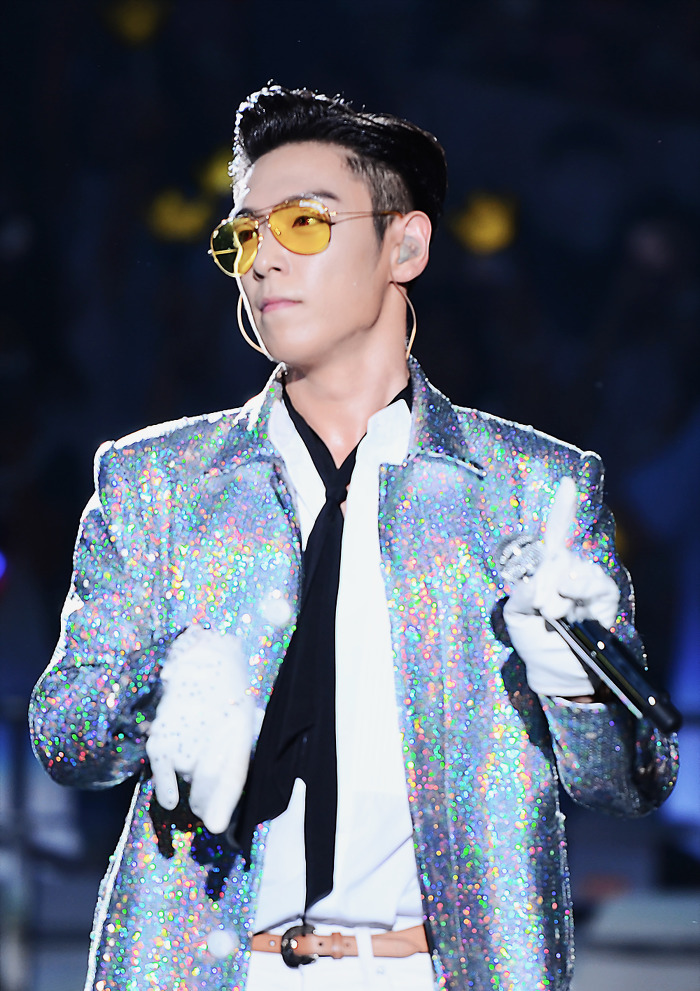

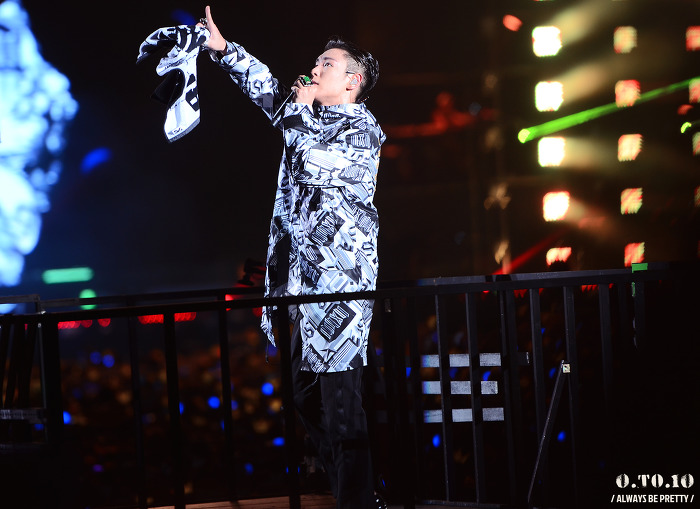

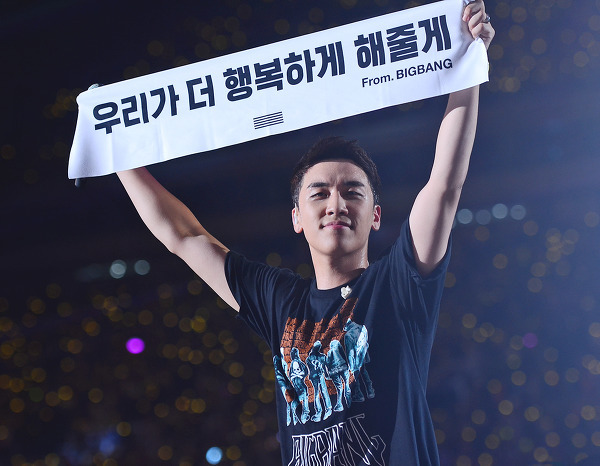

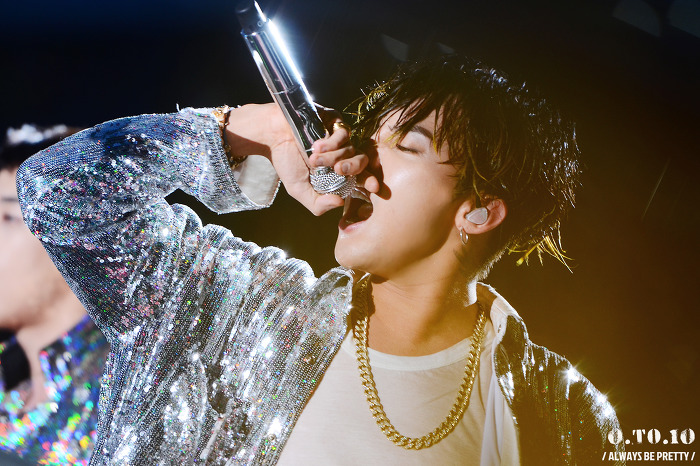

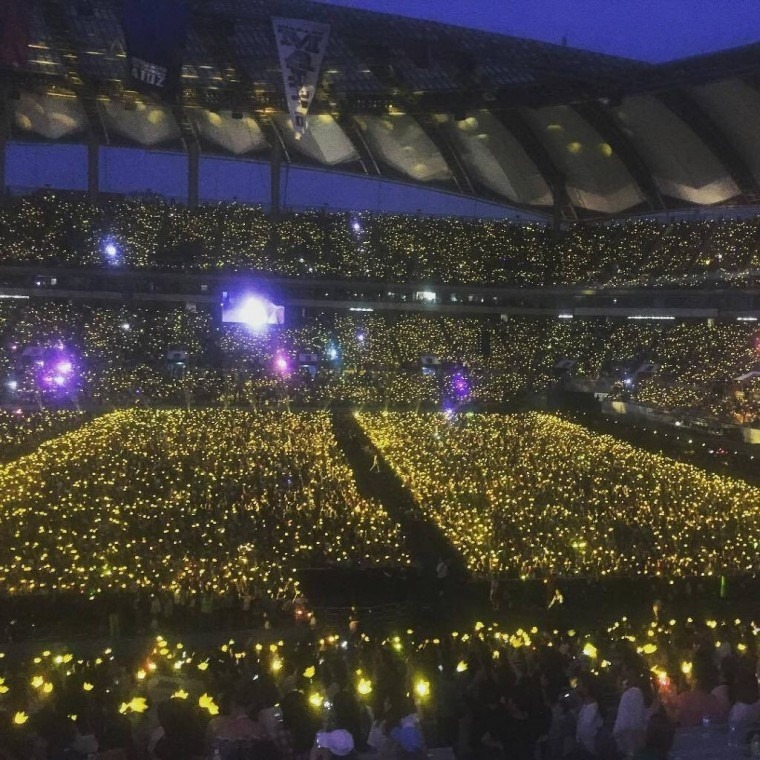

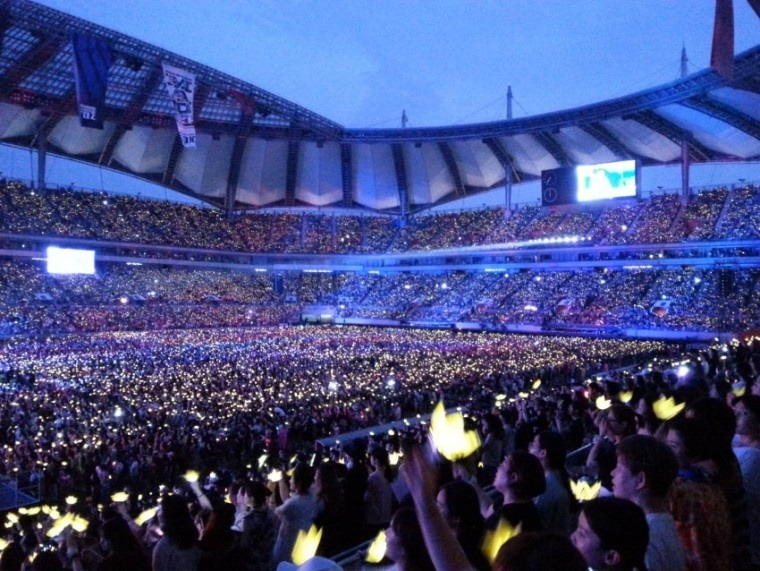

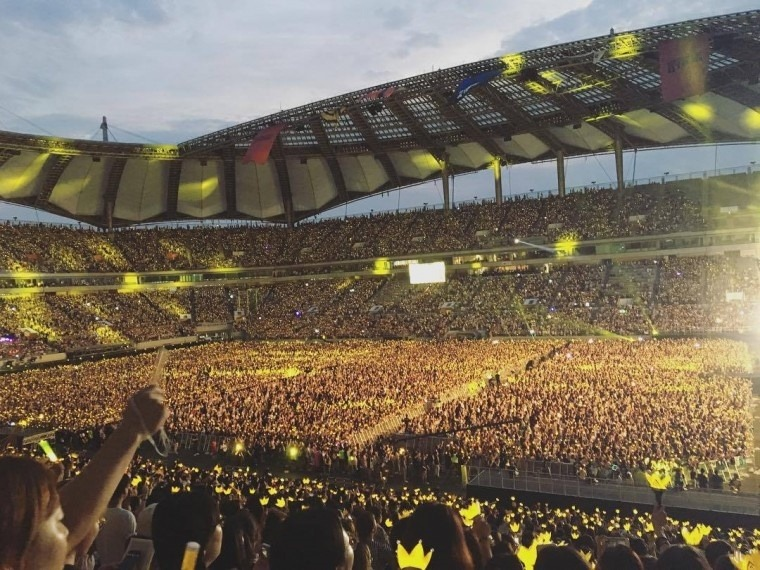

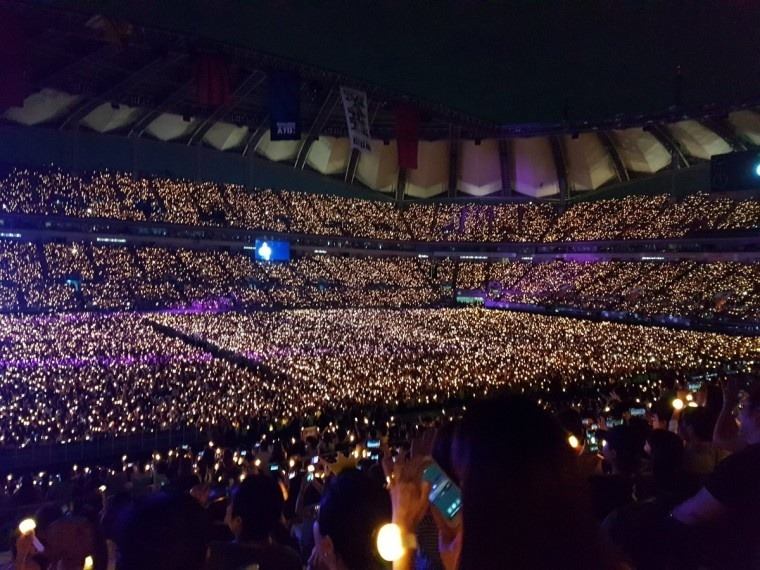

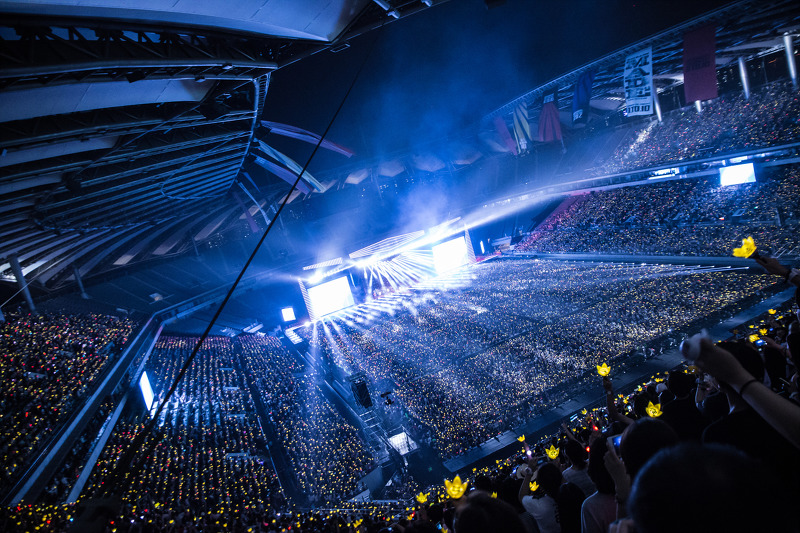

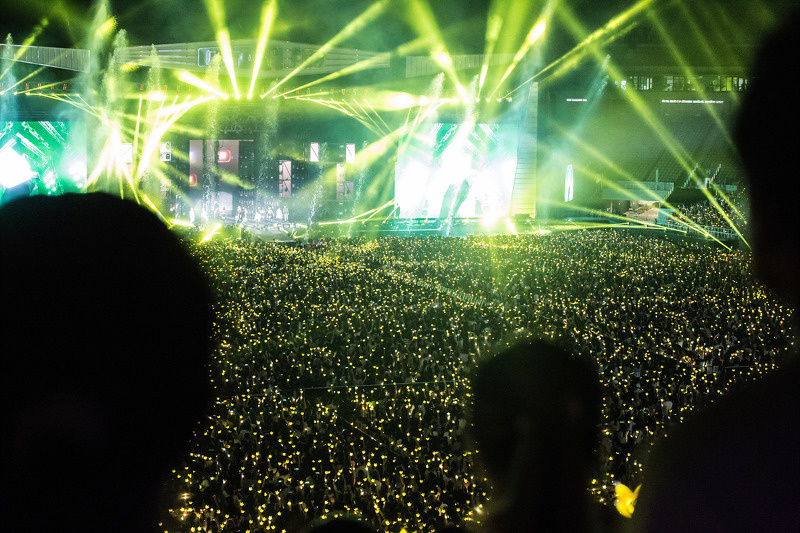

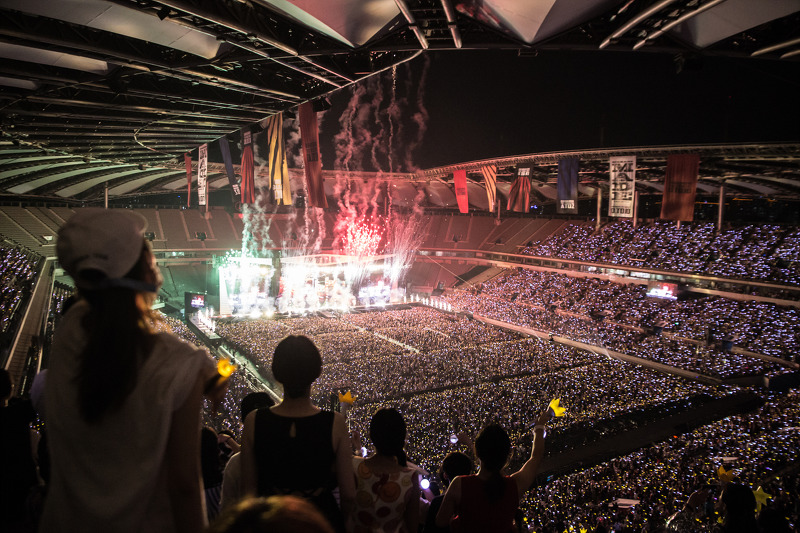
