= Shouting out to the World! =

2009 book by K-pop group Big Bang

Shouting out to the World!: A Run for the Dream, Big Bang's 13,140 Days Challenge
- The cover of the first edition
- Authors: Big Bang, Kim Se-a
- Original title: 세상에 너를 소리쳐!: 꿈으로의 질주, 빅뱅 13,140일의 도전
- Language: Korean
- Subject: Personal narrative
- Publisher: Sam & Parkers
- Publication date: January 28, 2009
- Publication place: South Korea
- Media type: Print (paperback)
- Pages: 280 (first edition)
- ISBN: 978-8-992-64760-1

Shouting out to the World!: A Run for the Dream, BigBang's 13,140 Days Challenge is a book released by South Korean group Big Bang on January 28, 2009. The book is actually more a book about self-development than one that is of BigBang's autobiography. It's a story about 5 teenagers achieving their dreams. Each member tell the story of their own journey & growth as they pursued their dreams. They also tell their feelings after realizing their dreams and their thought about what comes afterwards.

After the release the book instantly became a hot topic and after one month 300,000 copies already been sold. Good response for the book not only comes from the group fans. It has been a topic of discussion since the recommendation of various names such as businessmen, literary circles, and religious groups. It became no.1 on best seller list for 6 straight weeks and after 5 months the book already sold over 400,000 copies resulting in around KRW 4.5 billion revenues. In 2019, it was reported that the autobiography sold 550,000 copies making it the best-selling autobiography by Korean celebrity.

== Critical reception ==
H21 news outlet refer the book as "Book of hopes" also said about the book, "A brilliant and deep idol confession: Big Bang on taking on the challenge of being an idol. Big Bang's story proved that dreams can become a reality. Their passion and sincerity touched the lives of a lot of people and removed the preconception about them as being mere entertainers."

Kim Nan-do, a consumer science professor at Seoul National University, said "Since their birth, they have participated and shared with the community. The group was completed through communication with consumers and grew as they felt a sense of identity. Big Bang is a prime example of 'Web marketing 2.0'."

== Awards ==
Year	Recipient	Award	Result	Ref.
2010	Shouting out to the World!	H21's 2009 Book of the Year	Won	
