= BigBang (South Korean band) =

South Korean boyband

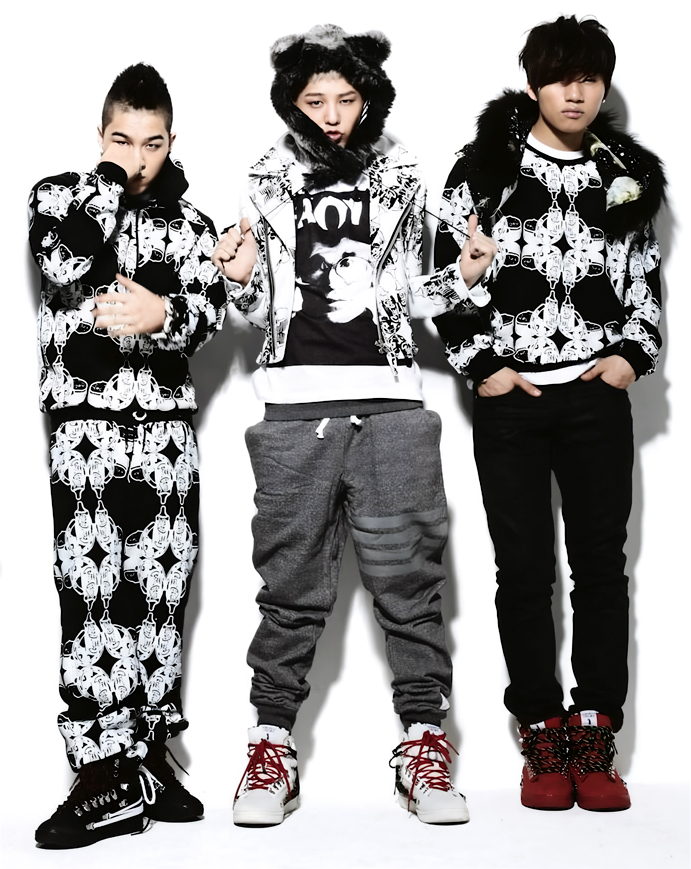
- BigBang in 2011; Left to Right: Taeyang, G-Dragon, and Daesung

Background information
- Origin: Seoul, South Korea
- Genres: K-pop; J-pop; hip hop; dance; electronic; R&B
- Years active: 2006–2018; 2022–present
- Labels: YG; Universal J; YGEX; Warner Taiwan
- Spinoffs: GD & TOP; GD X Taeyang
- Members: Taeyang; G-Dragon; Daesung
- Past members: T.O.P; Seungri
- Website: Official website at the Wayback Machine (archived May 17, 2023)

Korean name
- Hangul: 빅뱅
- RR: Bikbaeng
- MR: Pikpaeng

BigBang (Korean: 빅뱅; stylized in all caps) is a South Korean boy band formed by YG Entertainment. The group consists of three members: G-Dragon, Taeyang, and Daesung. BigBang was originally a five-piece band; Seungri retired from the entertainment industry in March 2019 and T.O.P left the group in May 2023. Dubbed the "Kings of K-pop", they helped spread the Korean Wave internationally and are considered one of the most influential acts in K-pop. They are known for their trendsetting musical experimentation, self-production, and stage presence.

Although their debut album, BigBang Vol.1 (2006), was released to lukewarm reception, greater success followed with a string of hit singles: "Lies", which topped Korean music charts for a record-breaking six consecutive weeks and won Song of the Year at the 2007 Mnet Km Music Festival and the 2008 Seoul Music Awards; "Last Farewell", "Haru Haru", and "Sunset Glow". After winning Artist of the Year at the 2008 Mnet Korean Music Festival and the 2008 Seoul Music Awards, the group released four Japanese studio albums—BigBang (2009), BigBang 2 (2011), Alive (2012), and Made Series (2016)—all of which were certified gold by the Recording Industry Association of Japan (RIAJ).

After a two-year hiatus in South Korea, the quintet returned with their fourth EP, Tonight (2011), which won them the inaugural Best Worldwide Act Award at the 2011 MTV Europe Music Awards. Their fifth EP, Alive (2012), became the first Korean album to chart on the US Billboard 200. Their third studio album, Made (2016), was preceded by several chart-topping singles and won the group Artist of the Year awards at the 2015 Mnet Asian Music Awards for the third time and at the 2015 Melon Music Awards. Its supporting tour, the Made World Tour, attracted 1.5 million people and set a new record for the most-attended concert tour headlined by a Korean act in history at the time.

Eleven of BigBang's singles have reached number one on South Korea's Gaon Digital Chart and have collectively remained atop the Melon charts for a record 51 weeks. They have sold over 140 million digital and physical records globally, which makes them one of the best-selling boy bands in the world. Forbes Korea ranked them as one of the most powerful celebrities in South Korea from 2009 to 2016 (placing 2nd in 2009, 2012 and 2014); and they were the first Korean artists to be included on the Forbes Celebrity 100 (2016) and 30 Under 30 list of most influential musicians in the world (2017).

== History ==
=== 2000–2006: Formation and debut ===
BigBang logo

Prior to the group's debut, a few of the members were already exposed to the entertainment industry. G-Dragon and Taeyang were the first ones to receive training under YG Entertainment at the age of eleven. After G-Dragon was approached by YG Entertainment for possible candidates to start a boy group, G-Dragon contacted T.O.P, his childhood friend, leading to the latter to audition. At the time, T.O.P was an underground rapper under the stage name "Tempo". One of his most popular tracks was "Buckwild" with NBK Gray. Seungri first appeared on the reality television series Let's Cokeplay: Mnet Battle Shinhwa, a show in which idol group Shinhwa search for members to make up the "second-generation Shinhwa". The original lineup consisted of six members: the aforementioned ones along with Daesung and Hyun-seung, who were both auditioned in. Their formation was documented on television; prior to their official debut, Hyun-seung was dropped. The Internet broadcast of the documentary exceeded one million views.

BigBang held their official debut on August 19, 2006, at Olympic Gymnastics Arena in Seoul during the YG Family 10th Anniversary Concert, which was broadcast the following month. Their first single "Bigbang", released shortly thereafter, contained the songs "We Belong Together", featuring label mate Park Bom; "A Fool's Only Tears" and "This Love", an adaptation of the American rock band Maroon 5 song, rewritten and performed by G-Dragon. The single went on to sell nearly 40,000 copies. The second single, BigBang Is V.I.P, was released in September, eventually topping 32,000 copies sold. Their last single, Bigbang 03, followed, with final sales nearing 40,000 copies. The quintet received the award of New Artist of the Month for October in the 2006 Cyworld Digital Music Awards. In December, the group held their first concert, The Real, at Olympic Gymnastics Arena for 12,000 fans. The release of their debut album, BigBang Vol. 1 – Since 2007 (2006) followed. Debuting at no. 3, the album went on to sell over 110,000 copies.

=== 2007–2008: Mainstream popularity and Japanese debut ===
On February 8, 2007, BigBang released their live concert album, The First / Real Live Concert, which sold 30,000 copies by the end of the year. They also began the Want You Tour in support of Since 2007, visiting five cities: Incheon, Daegu, Changwon, Jeonju and Busan. Their first extended play, Always (2007), marked several changes for the group. Though members had previously involved themselves with writing and composing, the group took more creative control over their music, moving away from their hip-hop roots. G-Dragon composed and wrote most of the tracks, including the lead single "Lies". The EP also saw the introduction of electronic music for BigBang. Receptions were fairly positive, most notably in regards to "Lies", which critics described as "through the roof". Released as the lead single, it became their first number one hit and the album sold over 120,000 copies. Topping music charts for six weeks, "Lies" went to become the first song to win the Song of the Month award from the Cyworld Digital Music Awards for two consecutive months, as well as gathering the highest monthly sales in Cyworld's history, with over 200,000 copies sold in September.

Their second EP, Hot Issue, released in November of the same year, contained six tracks, all written by G-Dragon, who was also the album's producer. Hot Issue followed its predecessor's success: the lead-single, "Last Farewell", topped various charts, including the Melon chart for eight consecutive weeks, becoming the longest-running number one hit by a boy group. It also garnered the Song of the Month (Digital Music) Award from Cyworld. "Fool" and "But I Love U", other tracks from the EP, also ranked within the top 10. The digital success led Hot Issue's sales to be moved over 120,000 copies total in South Korea. They also staged their BigBang is Great concert, with tickets selling out in 10 minutes.

"Lies" (2007)
Big Bang took a new direction with the release of their song "Lies" by incorporating electronic music into their style. The song eventually became their break-out hit.

Due to over-performing and exhaustion, several members were hospitalized, halting promotional activities. Despite this, their albums and singles were in high demand, causing the record company to reprint and repackage them for re-release. Riding on the success of their EPs, the group collected numerous awards, including Best Male Group and Song of The Year for "Lies" in the 2007 Mnet Asian Music Awards. They later received the Artist of the Year and Digital Record of Year awards from the 17th Seoul Music Awards. The group earned a total of ₩12 billion ($11.5 million) by year's end.

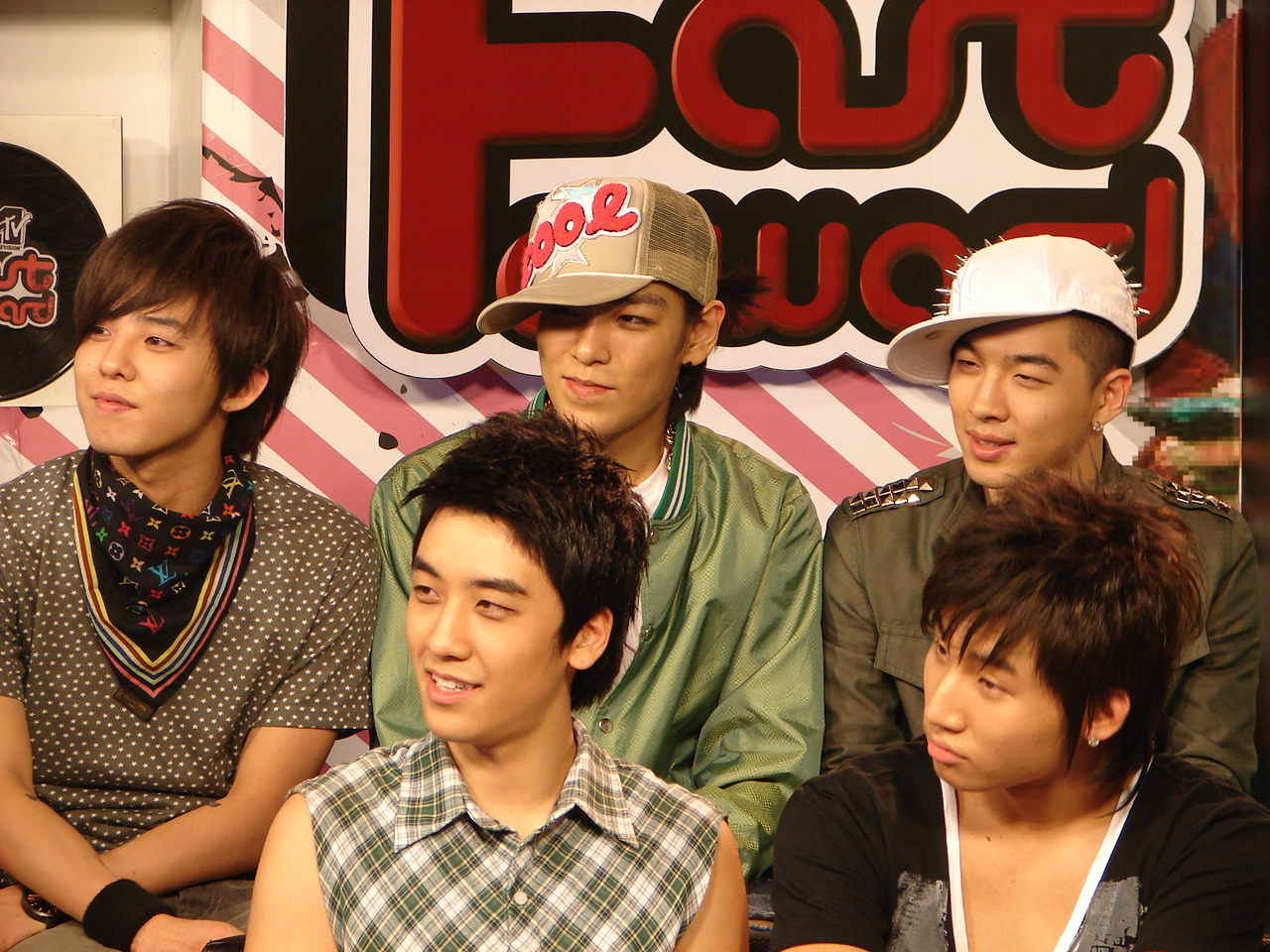
BigBang at MTV Fast Forward, Thailand in 2007

As 2007 came to a close, BigBang ventured overseas to Japan. Their first Japanese EP, For the World (2008), charted at number 10 on the Oricon chart with minimal promotion. The group also held a concert at the JCB Hall in Tokyo Dome City. BigBang returned to South Korea after their promotions in Japan ended. Although group activities were delayed due to solo projects, their third Korean EP, Stand Up, was released. Featuring artists such as Daishi Dance and the Korean rock-band No Brain, Stand Up exceeded the 200,000 mark in sales. "Haru Haru", the lead single, topped several online charts and held the number one position for seven consecutive weeks. It also became one of the most successful singles of all time in South Korea, selling over five million digital downloads in South Korea alone. The EP also included the top-five song "Heaven", (천국; cheonguk) the top-ten "Oh My Friend", and the top-twenty "A Good Man" and "Lady".

During the release of their Korean materials, BigBang released the Japanese song, "Number 1", from their first Japanese studio album of the same name, performing the song on Japanese radio programs and TV shows; the album peaked at number three on the Japan's Oricon daily album chart. Their second Korean studio album, Remember (2008), yielded the number one single, "Sunset Glow", a remake of the song of the same name by Lee Moon-se, released in 1988. "Strong Baby", performed solely by Seungri, was released as the second single. The album went on to sell over 200,000 copies. BigBang received their second Artist of the Year Award from the 2008 Mnet Asian Music Awards. At the end of 2008, it was reported that BigBang earned a total of ₩36 billion ($34.5 million).

=== 2009–2011: Solo endeavors, Japanese activities, and commercial success ===
While the group was on a break in early 2009, members pursued solo activities. They reunited to collaborate with 2NE1, their label's new girl group who had been dubbed as "The Female BigBang" at the time, for "Lollipop", a song used to promote a cell phone by LG Cyon. A music video was also filmed for promotion. BigBang also released their third endorsement digital single "So Fresh, So Cool" to promote the beer brand "Hite", although Seungri was not in the commercial due to the fact he was not of drinking age. Their second self-titled Japanese studio album was released under Universal Music in August 2009 and was promoted with two singles: "My Heaven" and "Gara Gara Go!! (ガラガラ Go!!)". "My Heaven", a Japanese re-recording of their Korean single "Heaven" from Stand Up, debuted at number three on the Oricon Music Chart. "Gara Gara Go!" charted at the fifth spot and the album itself peaked at number three.

Kicking off the new year with the 2010 Big Show concert at Olympics Gymnastics Arena, BigBang flew to Japan to embark on their Electric Love Tour. Their third Japanese studio album, Big Bang 2 (2011) was preceded with three singles: '"Koe wo Kikasete" (声をきかせて, lit. Let Me Hear Your Voice), "Tell Me Goodbye", and "Beautiful Hangover". "Koe wo Kikasete" was used in the Japanese drama Ohitorisama (おひとりさま, One Person), and peaked at number four on the Oricon Chart. "Tell Me Goodbye" was included in the Japanese re-release of Korean drama Iris. The song proved to be popular and gained favorable reviews, winning Song of the Year at the 52nd Japan Record Awards. Two promotional singles were also released in their home country: the number one song "Lollipop Part 2" to once again promote LG Cyon's Lollipop phone, and "Shout of the Reds" featuring the Korean rock band Transfixion and figure skater Kim Yuna in support of the 2010 World Cup. For most of the year, members individually promoted their own work, including the introduction of the sub-unit GD & TOP with their collaboration album. BigBang also won several notable awards, including the Best 5 New Artists award from the 24th Japan Gold Disc Awards as well as the Best New Artist award. Near the end of May, the group received the awards for Best Pop Video and Best New Artist from the MTV Video Music Awards Japan 2010.

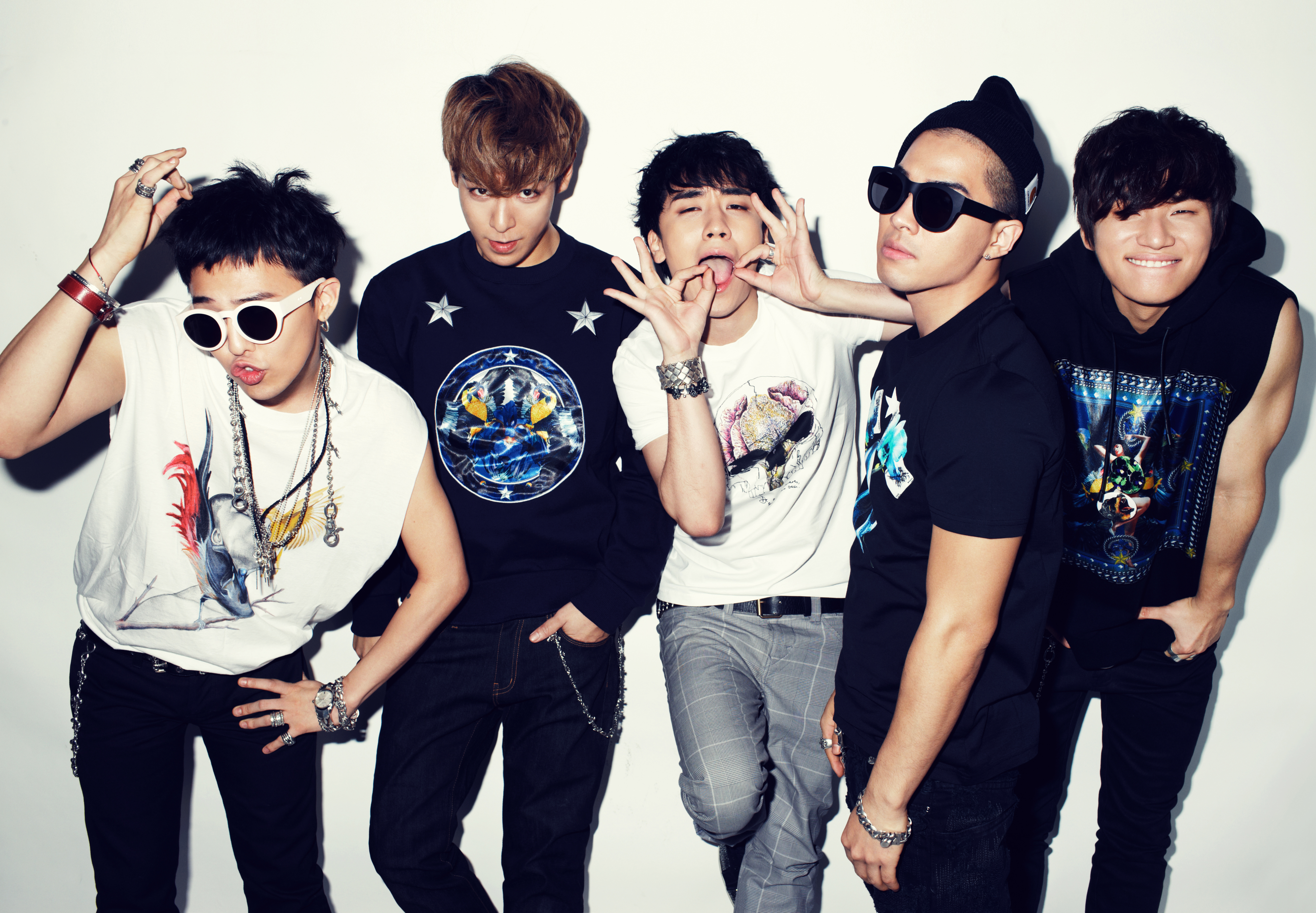
BigBang in 2011

After nearly two-year hiatus as a full group, BigBang returned to South Korea with their 2011 Big Show concert, showcasing songs from the upcoming EP Tonight. The album had a pre-sale order of 10,000 copies in Cyworld, beating the record set by TVXQ's 6,500 copies back in 2008, and moved 100,000 units in a week. Reception for the album was positive, with Choi Jun of Asiae complimenting the group's new direction in their music, acknowledging that during the two years hiatus, the group's "style and musical sensibility [had] deepened". Seven days after the album's release, it was reported that BigBang had already earned ₩7 billion (US$6.6 million). Its lead-single of the same name became a chart-topper on the Gaon Digital Chart, while four other album tracks peaked within the top 10, including the number-two "Café" and the number four "What is Right?". After promotions for Tonight was finished, BigBang released a special edition album with two new tracks: the chart-topper "Love Song" and the top 3 "Stupid Liar". Their third Japanese tour, Love and Hope, kicked off in May in support of the album. All performances were sold out, and a total of 100,000 fans attended the tour.

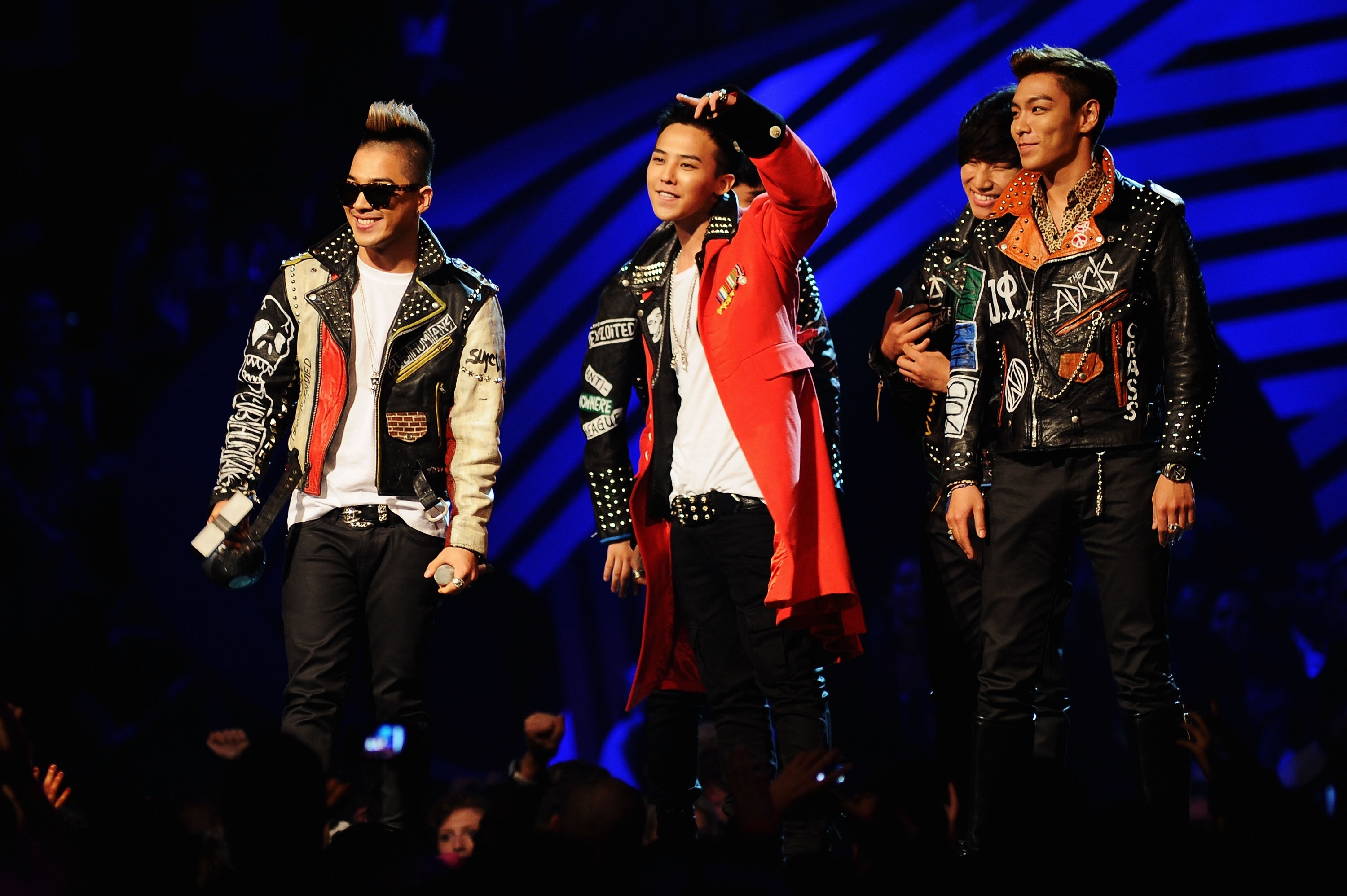
BigBang at the 2011 MTV Europe Music Awards

At the 2011 MTV EMAs, BigBang won the Best Worldwide Act award as representatives of the Asia-Pacific region with over 58 million votes. "Love Song" also won Best Music Video at the 2011 Mnet Asian Music Awards. At the end of the year, BigBang participated in the YG Family 15th Anniversary concert tour. This was followed by a release of their third Greatest Hits album The Best of Big Bang (2011) on December 14, which contained a Japanese version of "Haru Haru". The album topped the Oricon Daily chart on its first day of release and went on to sell over 14,000 copies in the first week. It was reported that BigBang earned ₩78 billion (US$69.4 million) in 2011 even though they had just promoted for half a year. The earnings included BigBang's revenue concert for SBS's BigBang Show, their 2011 Big Show Concert and their Love and Hope Tour in Japan.

=== 2012–2014: International breakthrough, first world tour, and hiatus ===
In January 2012, YG Entertainment began releasing teasers for BigBang's fifth Korean EP Alive, which was released in both digital and physical formats in February. Preorders for Alive amounted to 260,000 copies in two weeks. Three singles were released to promote the album: "Blue", the lead single, was released a week prior to the album and reached the number one position on all major domestic charts; the second single "Bad Boy" peaked at number two and was the only K-Pop song to be included in Fuse's best songs of 2012 list; while the last, "Fantastic Baby", rounded at number three. The music video for the latter became the band's most popular, having received more than 310 million views on YouTube, the most watched video by a Korean group, until it was surpassed in 2018. Internationally, BigBang obtained five spots out of the top-ten on Billboard K-pop's Hot 100 and charted at no. 150 on Billboard 200, making them the first Korean artist with a Korean album to do so. Their popularity also boosted them onto the Billboard Social 50, entering at number twenty-four. They later received recognition from notable sites such as Time magazine, and a photo of the group was featured on the Grammy Awards homepage.

The album release coincided with their annual concert, Big Show 2012, held at Seoul Olympic Park Stadium from March 2–4 to a sold-out crowd of 40,000 fans. This marked the official kick off of their first world tour, the Alive Galaxy Tour, in partnership with Live Nation. It was directed by renowned choreographer Laurieann Gibson, with BigBang performing at 21 cities in over 13 countries, with a total attendance of 800,000 people. Concert footage from Big Show was broadcast in 160 countries through MTV World Stage, which pushed the promotion for their world tour. The Alive Galaxy Tour marked the group's first ever concerts in the United States, Hong Kong and Europe. Due to high demand, additional concerts were held in Los Angeles, New Jersey and London. The quintet also performed at three Japanese dome venues for the first time, becoming the first Korean artist to perform at all three of these venues during its tour. The group concluded the tour with concerts in Osaka in mid-January along with a three night stint at the Olympic Gymnastics Arena in Seoul later that month.

The Japanese version of Alive was released on March 28 both digitally and physically, with two additional Japanese tracks. Included with the physical copy of their album was a bonus Japanese version of their hit song "Haru Haru". It sold over 23,000 copies on its first day of release and peaked at number two on the Oricon charts, eventually selling over 200,000 copies total and certified gold by the RIAJ. Japanese promotions began with a performance at 2012's Springroove Festival alongside top American and Japanese hip hop artists. BigBang was the first Korean act to be invited along with label-mates 2NE1. Following the success of their comeback, BigBang released a special edition album titled Still Alive on June 3. It featured four new tracks including two new Korean tracks of which their lead single was titled "Monster", as well as Korean remakes of the two additional tracks in the Japanese version of Alive. The album sold over 100,000 copies in its first month of release. A special Monster edition of their Japanese Alive album was also released on June 20, following its Korean counterpart.

The success of their special edition album further boosted the group's global recognition, peaking at no. 11 on the Billboard Social 50. On November 30, 2012, BigBang received a total of three awards at the 14th Mnet Asian Music Awards, including Best Male Group and Artist of the Year. G-Dragon also took home Best Male Solo award at the event. They also received the Best Fan category award at the Italian TRL Awards. After promotional activities wrapped up, the members pursued individual activities for the majority of 2013 and 2014.

BigBang reunited in November 2013 for their Japan Dome Tour, holding concerts in six different dome arenas in Japan, being the first foreign act to do so. Gathering over 770,000 fans, the tour's total revenue, including tickets sold and merchandising sales, totalled $94 million. In October 2014, the group performed at the closing ceremony of the 2014 Asian Games held in Incheon, South Korea, wrapping up the Congratulatory Performance. A month later, the quintet embarked on their second Japanese dome tour, which was the first time that any overseas artist performed in five dome arenas of Japan for two consecutive years. By the end of 2014, BigBang was the Korean artist that attracted the most concertgoers in Japan for the year and the second act overall.

=== 2015–2016: Made, second world tour and tenth anniversary ===
BigBang was on hiatus for two years while G-Dragon experienced a "career slump" and was unable to find inspiration to write new music for the band, explaining that "In the past, even after coming back from a long, tiring day, I would write at least two songs at the dorm before I slept as if it were my duty. [In 2014], however, things just weren't working out for me so the album kept getting delayed." In 2015, BigBang made their comeback by releasing special project singles for their album Made: M, A, D, and E. The first single, M, released in May, included the two songs "Loser" and "Bae Bae", which debuted at number one and number two, respectively, on Billboard's World Digital Songs, making the quintet the first K-pop boy band to top the chart and the second Korean artist to occupy the top two slots simultaneously after labelmate Psy. "Loser" won Song of the Year at the 30th Golden Disk Awards, while "Bae Bae" won Song of the Year at the 13th Korean Music Awards. Both tracks were named by Billboard as one of the best K-pop songs of 2015, with "Loser" topping the list. The following month saw the release of A, which included "Bang Bang Bang" and "We Like 2 Party", that also went on to occupy the number one and two positions on Billboard's World Digital Chart. "Bang Bang Bang" won Song of the Year at the 17th Mnet Asian Music Awards, and was the best-performing single of 2015 in South Korea according to the Gaon Digital Chart. D was released in July and included "Sober" (맨정신; Maenjeongsin) and "If You". "If You" landed on Billboard's World Digital Chart at number two and topped the Gaon Digital Chart, while "Sober" charted at number two in their home country. The consecutive monthly releases concluded with E in August, with the songs "Zutter" featuring the sub-unit of GD & TOP, and "Let's Not Fall in Love" The latter peaked at number one on the Gaon Digital Chart and on Billboard's World Digital Songs chart.

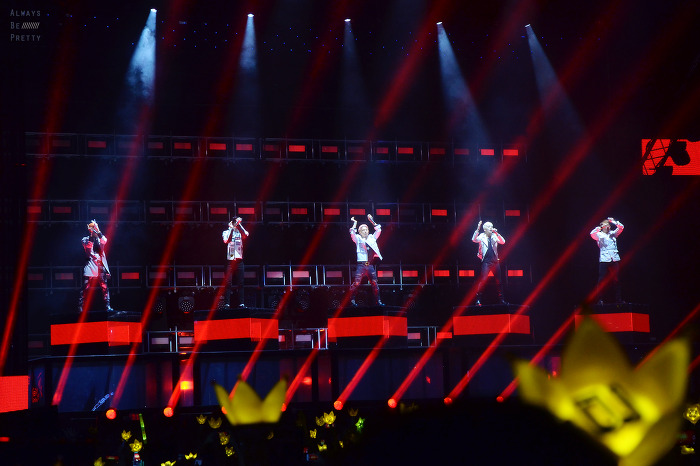
BigBang during the Made World Tour in China, 2015

To promote their singles, BigBang embarked on their second world tour which received positive reviews and was commercially successful. Kicking off with two shows in Seoul on April 25 and 26, the tour gathered 1.5 million fans around the world, making it the largest tour by any Korean act. By the end of the year, BigBang had earned over ₩150 billion (US$120 million). Despite the commercial success of the singles, the release of the full album was postponed to add new songs to the album and for the group to rest after four months of promotions. BigBang continued touring into 2016 for their Made V.I.P Tour, visiting China, Macau, Malaysia, Singapore, Taiwan and the United States. The group was the highest earning artist of 2016 in mainland China based on concert revenue, by earning US$70.3 million, accounting for 70% of the entire total box office of South Korean artists in China for the year. In April and May, they toured Japan for their Fantastic Babys Tour, meeting 280,000 fans.

Several projects were launched to commemorate the group's 10th anniversary. The first was the documentary film Big Bang Made, which followed the group through their Made Tour in 2015, released on June 30, 2016. The band held a 10th anniversary concert tour, 0.TO.10, from July 2016 to January 2017, which included sold-out stadium shows at Yanmar Stadium Nagai in Osaka, Japan and at Seoul World Cup Stadium in Seoul, South Korea. The tour drew 781,500 attendees from 16 concerts in Japan, and made BigBang the act with the biggest concert mobilization power for the year in Japan, the first time a foreign act has topped the list. Overall, they gathered a 1.1 million attendance for the tour. The band also held an art exhibition, titled A TO Z, to showcase the history of the group as well as to celebrate a decade with their fans. The exhibition ran from August 5 to October 30 at the S-Factory in Seoul. The exhibition travelled to Taipei, Taiwan from June 24 to August 22, 2017.

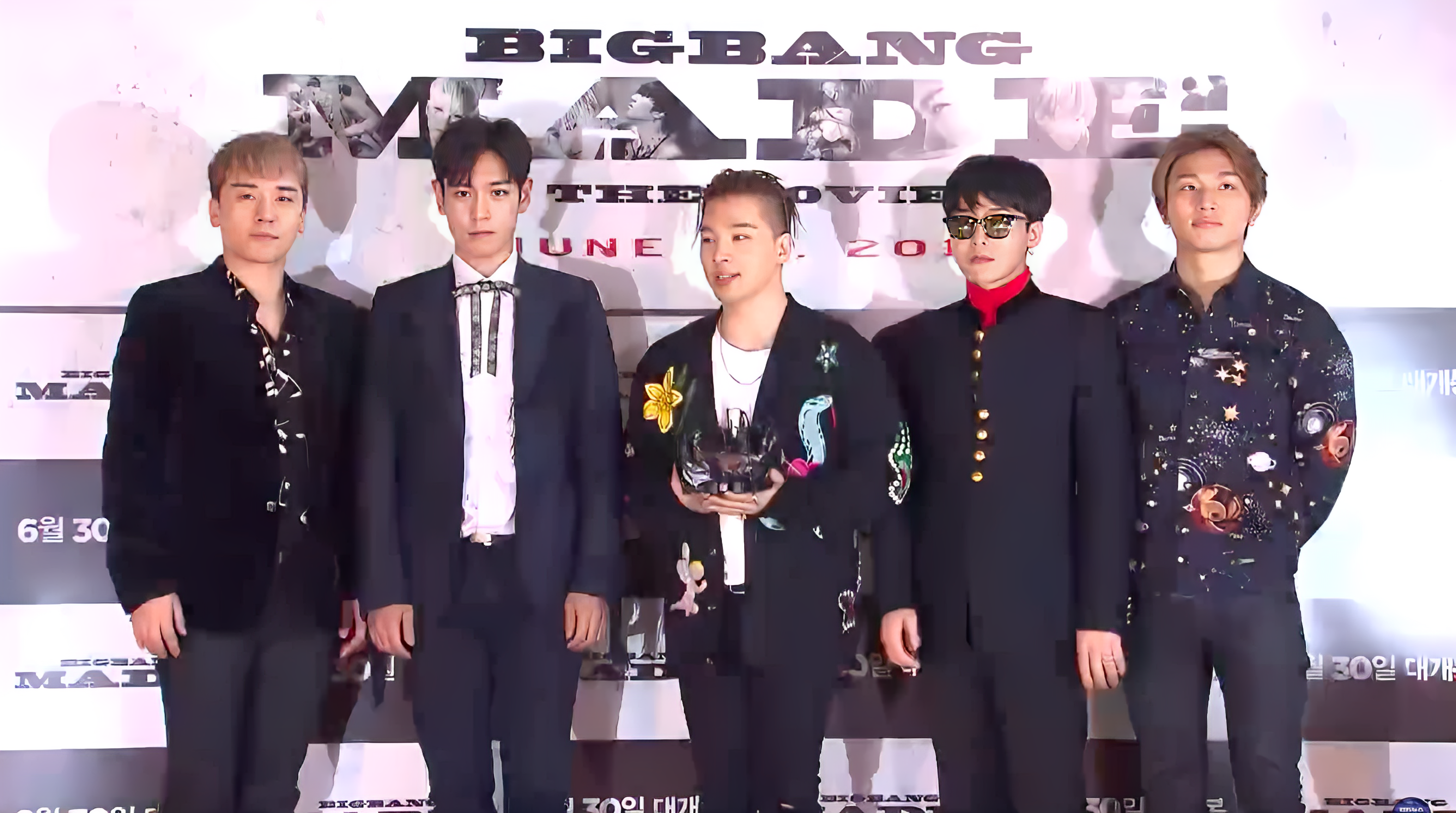
BigBang in 2016

After a year of delay, Made was released in December 2016. Two singles were announced for the release: "Fxxk It", and "Last Dance". The two songs, along with "Girlfriend", took the three top places on the Gaon Digital Chart, selling over one million digital copies combined in five days. The same songs peaked at number 2, 3 and 4 on the Billboard World Digital Songs chart, selling 13,000 copies combined. The digital version of Made sold over 1 million digital copies on QQ Music, Kugou, and Kuwo, China's three major music platforms in a day. The album debuted at No. 172 on the United States Billboard 200 with 6,000 equivalent album units, 4,000 of which were in traditional album sales, earning the band their second entry on the chart. They also debuted at no. 1 on the World Albums chart and the Heatseekers Albums chart. In their home country, South Korea, the physical version of the album topped the Gaon Albums chart. Two final concerts were held at Gocheok Sky Dome in January 2017 to wrap up their 10th anniversary tour and Made's promotional activities.

=== 2017–2021: Touring, military service, and Seungri's retirement ===
As per South Korea's mandatory military service requirement, T.O.P. enlisted for his two-year service on February 9, 2017, as a conscripted policeman. The remaining members continued promotions without him, holding their fifth annual Japanese dome tour, the Last Dance Tour, in November with 14 concerts in four cities with an attendance of 696,000 fans. The two final shows of the tour were also held at Gocheok Sky Dome in Seoul on December 30 and 31. In 2017, YG Entertainment released a reality program starring the group named Run, Big Bang Scout! through YouTube Red, which was the service's first original content to be produced in a country outside of the United States. The first episode of the program was free-released and has gathered over 12.7 million views on YouTube. The following year, the remaining members began their enlistment: G-Dragon on February 27, Taeyang on March 12, and Daesung on March 13, 2018. Seungri was initially announced to enlist on March 25, 2019. The single, "Flower Road", was released on March 13, 2018, as a goodbye to their fans. "Flower Road" set a record in China, reaching over a million sales in 3 days and 14 hours, the shortest amount of time for a Korean artist. The song also topped Billboard's World Digital Songs Chart, and the Gaon Digital Chart, where the song recorded the highest digital index of the year thus far.

On March 11, 2019, Seungri announced his retirement from the entertainment industry due to scandals surrounding the Burning Sun nightclub, resulting in his departure from BigBang. On July 6, 2019, T.O.P was the first member to be discharged from the military. He was followed by G-Dragon on October 25, 2019. Taeyang and Daesung were discharged on November 10. On January 3, 2020, it was announced that BigBang would be performing at the Coachella Valley Music and Arts Festival, which would have marked their first performance as a group in three years if it weren't for the COVID-19 pandemic. In March, despite reports suggesting otherwise, all four members renewed their contracts with YG Entertainment and were preparing for a comeback that was eventually delayed.

=== 2022–2025: Return from hiatus, "Still Life", members' label changes and T.O.P's withdrawal ===
On February 7, 2022, YG Entertainment announced BigBang would return with a digital single in spring. They also announced that T.O.P had ended his exclusive contract with YG Entertainment, although he will still participate in group activities. The group released a new single titled "Still Life" on April 5, their first comeback in four years, and first as a quartet. "Still Life" debuted at number one on South Korea's Gaon Digital Chart, making it BigBang 11th number-one song, a record for any group in history of the chart. From only three and a half days of tracking, the single also reached top 10 on Billboard's Global 200 and Global Excluding US charts, becoming the third Korean act to do so. The single debuted at number one on the Hong Kong, Malaysia, Singapore, Vietnam Singles Charts, and number three on Taiwan Singles Chart and Australia Hitseekers Singles, becoming the group's first entry in these countries. The single also debuted in the top 100 in multiple countries including Indonesia, New Zealand, Netherlands, Hungary, Japan, UK and Canada. On December 27, 2022, it was confirmed by YG that Daesung had terminated his contract and was looking for a new start.

On May 31, 2023, T.O.P revealed that he had "already withdrawn" from the group. In January 2025, T.O.P. ruled out any future return to the group, stating that his departure was final due to his past drug scandal and feeling ashamed of facing the other members. In June 2023, G-Dragon's official contract with YG expired, making him the last member of BigBang to leave the label. In January 2024, the group's artist profile was removed from YG Entertainment's official platform, signifying that the group was no longer directly managed under the label.

On November 23, 2024, the remaining three members made a surprise reunion performance during G-Dragon's solo stage at the 2024 MAMA Awards in Osaka, marking their first live performance together since 2017. They performed G-Dragon's single "Home Sweet Home", followed by their hit singles "Bang Bang Bang" and "Fantastic Baby".

=== 2026–present: "BiiiG" and "XX : COSMOS" 20th anniversary tour ===
On September 16, 2025, it was officially confirmed that BigBang would perform as a reconfigured trio at the Coachella Valley Music and Arts Festival in April 2026, six years after their originally scheduled 2020 festival appearance was canceled due to the COVID-19 pandemic. The appearances coincided with the 20th anniversary of the group's debut.

On March 4, 2026, YG Entertainment released its strategic roadmap, announcing that the members of BigBang had reached a mutual agreement with the agency to execute a large-scale global concert tour celebrating their 20th anniversary, with executive producer Yang Hyun-suk pledging a historically comprehensive live production. Following their performance at Coachella, leader G-Dragon confirmed that the XX: Cosmos World Tour would commence in August 2026, teasing it as a complete "reset" for the group's legacy. According to reports dated July 7, BigBang will release a new song within the month.

In August 2026, YG Entertainment announced a series of projects commemorating BigBang's 20th debut anniversary. On August 19, the group's anniversary date, BigBang is scheduled to release the digital single "BiiiG", their first group release in four years and four months since "Still Life" in April 2022. YG described the single as a song representing the group's present identity at the 20-year milestone, while its title is a stylized form of the English word "big", referencing the group's name and career. The anniversary celebrations also include the BIGBANG 2026–2027 World Tour [XX: COSMOS], which is scheduled to begin with three concerts at Goyang Stadium from August 21 to 23, shortly after the release of "BiiiG". The tour is planned to span 19 cities with 33 performances across Asia, North America, Europe and Oceania, with further dates expected to be announced. Additional commemorative projects were planned in Seoul, including fan events and media exhibitions around the Han River and Jamsil areas. On November 20, 2026, BigBang released the digital single "GiiiRIP" at 2 p.m. KST without prior announcement, three months after "BiiiG". Only a teaser poster reading "2026.11.20. 2PM (KST)" was released beforehand, and the title was not revealed until the song came out. A hip-hop track, it was written and composed by G-Dragon, with lyrics co-written by Taeyang and production support from Teddy, and it interpolates Kelis's "Milkshake", written by Pharrell Williams and Chad Hugo. Like "BiiiG", the title uses a stylized spelling with three consecutive letter "i"s. The group was scheduled to perform at the 2026 MAMA Awards at Kyocera Dome Osaka the following day, November 21.

== Artistry ==
=== Musical style ===
BigBang have been praised for their musical individuality and ability to fuse a pop sound with rap, R&B and dance elements. They are known for experimentalism and for a "dominating style of music that surpasses genre boundaries". During the early days of their career, BigBang's music was predominantly hip hop and pop rap, although they incorporated R&B songs into their albums as well. A writer for Yahoo! Japan once compared their early materials to that of American hip-hop artists such as The Black Eyed Peas, stating that their songs included "catchy vocals, [...] rap and characters". The song "Ma Girl", Taeyang's first solo from the group's first album, was described as "[s]mooth, sexy and bass-heavy" and reminiscent of Omarion. Similarly, Seungri's first solo from the same album, "Next Day", was stated to have an "intense '90s Usher vibes".

The group's first EP Always (2007) was a sonic departure from their previous efforts, experimenting for the first time with electronic dance music and setting it as the new musical trend in Korea. From their EP Hot Issue (2007), the "shibuya-kei-influenced" track "Fool" contained a "heavy dance beat paired with a smooth disco coating." "Haru Haru" from Stand Up (2008) was admired for "weaving in and out of tempos seamlessly and forcing a sense of anxiety on the listener through the beating undercurrent" and hailed as an "experiential masterpiece". They also collaborated with the Korean rock-band No Brain on the rock song "Oh My Friend". Alive (2012) showcased more of the group's raw voices over their usual autotune with "a mature kind of intensity"; its tracks further expanded the group's diverse genre experimentation portfolio. Lead single "Blue" was distinguished for its "more interesting electronic samples and production techniques", "Bad Boy" was described as a "nostalgic" and "perfect pop song" that "transcends language", and "Monster" was praised for its mournful vocals and orchestral sound.

On their "career-exemplifying" third album Made (2016), the group mixed a variety of electronic music with soft rock. "Loser" was cited for "introduc[ing] a more mature style" to BigBang's discography "without losing the images they had enforced through previous releases", while "Bang Bang Bang" was noted for its modern EDM-inspired sound. The "boundary-pushing elements" of "Bae Bae" helped popularize the trap genre in K-pop. "Let's Not Fall in Love" focused on the group's less-seen "tender" side with a "lush" production that "evokes a range of emotions". "Girlfriend" was a "mellow hip-hop throwback to the group's early days".

"La La La" (2006)
One of their earliest singles released, "La La La" is primarily a hip-hop song.

"Oh My Friend" (2008)
Although their roots are tied with hip-hop music, BigBang recorded the rock-based song "Oh My Friend" with the rock group No Brain.

Since members of the band have also experimented widely with other genres on solo projects, the group has been described as "rich in variety". Taeyang's EP Hot was mainly a collection of R&B songs, the singer naming the genre his "main focus". Daesung's first digital single, "Look at Me, GwiSoon" was a trot song, which drew criticism due to BigBang's image as "hip-hop artists". On his debut album Heartbreaker, G-Dragon incorporated dance, hip-hop, and R&B. Justin McCurry from The Guardian stated, "Each of the five members has his own individual look, and their musical range is equally eclectic, covering R&B, hip-hop, house, electro and pop." BigBang have been described as "artistic superheroes" for their "versatility and success in whatever they do". Their continued experimentation with a diverse range of musical styles and their distinct personalities have been highlighted as some of the main reasons for their popularity and longevity. The Chosun Ilbo explained that their "strong lead among idol groups" was a result of the quality of their music, noting that "whenever Big Bang promotes new songs, they want to introduce something new and tell us new stories." G-Dragon commented, "We are Korean, so obviously they call our music K-pop. But we never thought of our music as K-pop. Our music is just our music." T.O.P also disagreed with the "K-pop" label, opining that "[y]ou don't divide pop music by who's doing it. We don't say, for instance, 'white pop' when white people make music."

=== Songwriting and lyrical themes ===
BigBang are known for maintaining tight control over their music, heavily involving themselves in songwriting and record production since their debut, unlike many Korean idol groups. As leader, G-Dragon has had a central role in producing almost their entire discography across a ten-year span and was credited as the main songwriter for the group's earlier hits such as "Lies", "Last Farewell", and "Haru Haru". The single "Last Dance" was written collaboratively by G-Dragon, T.O.P, and Taeyang and co-produced by G-Dragon.

Recurring concepts in BigBang's lyrics are love and relationships. In "Bingle Bingle", the protagonist pleads to his lover to take the next step in their relationship. In contrast, "Let's Not Fall in Love" halts the growth of a new relationship, depicting hesitation toward opening up to someone. BigBang's songs have covered other themes as well, ranging from mature to personal. "Fantastic Baby" and "Bang Bang Bang" are often categorized as club music due to their lyrical content, the former described as having an "anarchistic" theme, and the latter being dubbed the "party anthem of 2015". The use of vulgarity in "Fxxk It" was seen as evidence of the members' growth, and the lyrics of "Bae Bae" were also noted for their sexual metaphors. On the other hand, their song "Loser" attempted to "humanize the group" by discussing their flaws, "Sober" talks about chasing one's dream, and "Last Dance" is an ode to the band's time together.

G-Dragon's contributions to the group's musical output were praised by The Korea Times, who described him as a "genius singer-songwriter". The rapper himself describes BigBang as "an idol group not born of talent but through effort." A writer for Yahoo! Japan complimented the group for their involvement in their own work, stating that "perhaps by contributing to their own materials, not only do they become in sync with one another, but each person's personality stands out."

=== Stage and aesthetic ===
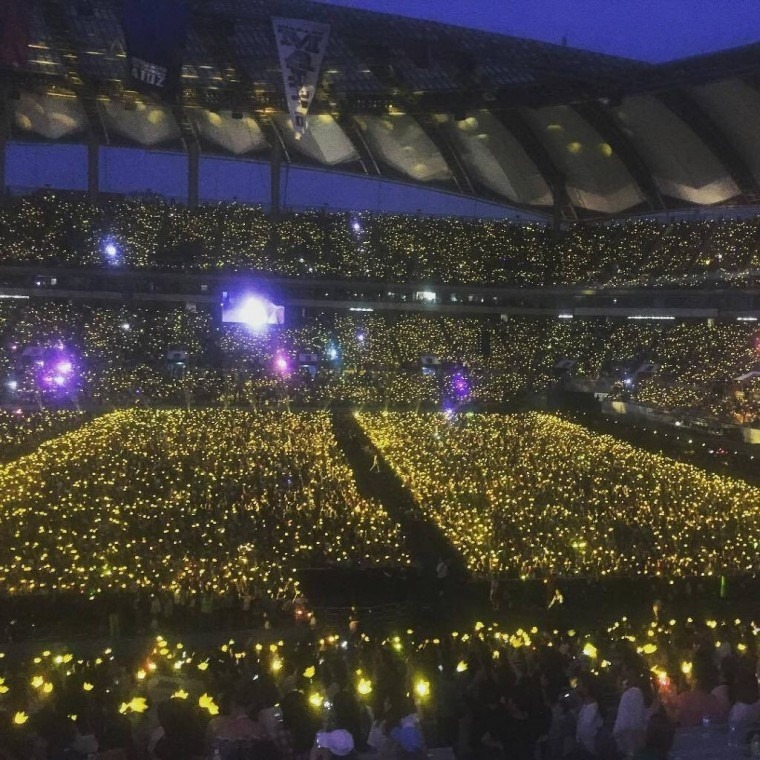
BigBang's 0.TO.10 concert in Seoul in 2016

BigBang have been praised for their live performances, stage presence, and choreographies. Early in their career, the group was choreographed by Seungri and frequent collaborator Shaun Evaristo. Although they once relied heavily on street dancing for their moves, they have since used other styles of choreography. One of the moves from their debut single "La La La", involving the group lifting their shirts to expose their abdomens, quickly gained popularity online and became one of the top searches on the internet. The choreography for "Last Farewell", in which a particular move mimics "jump roping", also gained widespread domestic attention. The choreography for "Bang Bang Bang" by Parris Goebel was one of the most popular dances of 2015. The group's use of props during performances—including "an abundance of pyrotechnics, streamers[,] confetti", LED lights, fog, as well as digitalized "fire-breathing dragons and a rotor-spinning helicopter"—has been well received by critics.

In a review of their world tour, The Muse admired the group for playing every song like it was the last and for their precision delivery and individual strengths. At the peak of popularity of Psy's "Gangnam Style", The New York Times journalist Jon Caramanica noted how BigBang's concert in New Jersey was the "true wild heart of K-pop" as opposed to Psy, highlighting their brightly colored costumes, choreography, and stage presence. In 2012, they ranked first in the Philippines's Top 3 Mall of Asia Arena concerts, and their concert in Lima was named the best in South America for the year. When compared to western artists such as Justin Bieber and One Direction, BigBang's performances were noted for having their "edges [...] crisper, the sound louder, the dancing sharper". Their Alive Tour show at the Prudential Center in Newark, New Jersey was ranked second on the New York Times' list of the best concerts in 2012. In March 2012, Krista Mahr from Time magazine praised the group's concert at the Olympic Gymnastics Arena in Seoul, describing them as "K-pop gods" for their stage presence. BigBang's Made World Tour in 2015 was also a critical and commercial success, the Los Angeles Times calling their Anaheim show an "incredibly significant moment for K-Pop", praising the diversity of their songs and performances and noting how the concert "escalated the craft of live K-Pop — which sometimes doesn't live up to the overwhelming enthusiasm of its fans — into a sleeker and more adventurous kind of arena spectacular." Including the group in their list of best concerts of the year for the second time, The New York Times noted how the "electric, sleek and dizzyingly busy concert by one of South Korea's most vital K-pop acts made even its biggest American counterparts look like rank amateurs."

== Public image ==
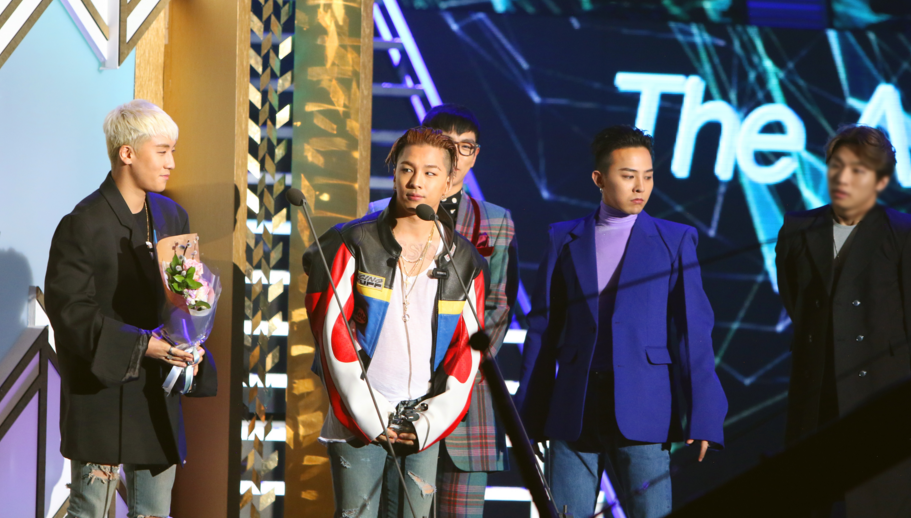
BigBang accepting an award in 2016

BigBang's influence extends beyond the music industry, having shaped major fashion international trends. Dubbed "Big Bang fashion", their style has been followed extensively throughout Asia and made them into a cultural phenomenon in South Korea. The clothes that members wore on stage were often copied and sold at Dongdaemun Market. In 2011, BigBang collaborated with Japanese clothing retailer Uniqlo to create a line of T-shirts that quickly sold out. The Chicago Sun-Times called the members "the most daring, dapper dressers in the world" and praised their style as "bold, innovative and trend-setting". Their impact on the Korean fashion industry was highlighted in Vogue Korea's exhibition in Seoul.

Their unique stage fashion and hairstyles has also been highlighted. Fuse TV noted that "their outfits are almost as entertaining as their performances." The group initially adopted the "hip-hop" concept for their debut. However, the release of Always in 2007 marked a change in image, with the group leaning towards a more preppy-punk style. Their skinny jeans and Converse shoes trended widely in South Korea, and Taeyang received attention trading his cornrows for a faux hawk. BigBang also wore custom-printed hoodies for many of their performances and music videos and have been seen in brands such as Bape, 10 deep, Louis Vuitton, Jeremy Scott, and Phenomenon. The group was also credited for bringing back "old school" fashion into the mainstream, popularizing high-top sneakers from brands such as Nike and Reebok. Described as the "most fashionable" one in the group, G-Dragon famously wore triangular scarves that were later nicknamed "BigBang scarves" during promotions for the single "Lies". T.O.P also became known for wearing sunglasses during performances.

== Cultural impact and legacy ==
=== Commercial and economy ===
"The name Big Bang alone carries significant weight in K-pop. It took about a decade for Big Bang to evolve from a young idol group into a quintet of cultural icons. [...] The fashion-conscious, song-and-dance-loving artists became trendsetters, producing a variety of hip-hop tracks. Everything from their outfits to their hairstyles immediately became the standard. It was not just in Korea either. Big Bang reached beyond Asia, and the members have grown to be truly global stars. [...] Big Bang's first 10 years have been overwhelming and left an indelible mark on Korean pop music history." — Beyond Magazine

BigBang is responsible for more than half of all albums sold by the label in Korea from 2014 to 2017, before their hiatus due to military enlistment. They were the first Korean mainstream hip hop idols, credited for helping popularize the genre throughout Asia as one of the driving forces behind the Hallyu Wave. The Korea Times called BigBang "the icons of Korean pop [music]" and stating that G-Dragon's rise to one of the most accomplished songwriters in K-pop "has inspired many young idol-wannabes to become singer-songwriters." Yonhap News Agency noted that the group helped "spread K-pop as a cultural brand spanning the U.S., Europe, Latin America and the Middle East." In 2011, the BBC declared that "K-pop bands, including Big Bang, are making their mark around the world", specifically citing the group's contribution to YG Entertainment's economic growth.

After the group won the 2011 MTV Europe Music Award for Best Worldwide Act, Google announced that its subsidiary YouTube would launch its own channel for K-pop music in recognition of its popularity and success. British newspaper The Guardian also discussed how the win had "shed light on the rise of Korean music across Europe". Jacques Peterson from The Sydney Morning Herald attributed BigBang's success to giving a "idiosyncratic twist" on genres that breaks the mould of the idol group formula. Suk Park, the president of DramaFever, hailed them as the vanguard of K-pop. Seoul-based entertainment journalist Mark James Russell praised the group for defying categorization, stating how "[o]f all the mainstream acts, they're doing the most to push boundaries of what is considered K-pop." Anna Fifield from The Washington Post claimed that they "have defined and redefined South Korean pop music. They've defied the idea that so-called K-Pop is inevitably sugarcoated and factory-produced, and that boy bands are all about pretty faces and lip-synching." Los Angeles Times praised BigBang's constant sonic and image reinvention, calling the group as "one of the most inventive, aesthetically visionary acts in its genre." In an article commemorating BigBang's tenth anniversary, Billboard stated that "no act has enthralled the Korean music world in the past decade quite like BigBang" and later adding that they have "shaped the Korean music industry" and were enabled to "surpass international boundaries and shirk off the limitations of K-pop's youth-focused industry."

In recognition of their global popularity, BigBang are a prominent face of South Korean tourism. Their Big Show concerts were promoted by the South Korean Ministry of Culture, Sports and Tourism's Visit Korea Committee from 2010 to 2012 due to the group's "big economic impact on the country." In 2014, Korea Post honored BigBang by releasing official postage stamps containing images of the group. In 2016, they were chosen as ambassadors for the country's "Creative Korea" tourism campaign and ranked second on Time magazine's reader polls for Most Influential People in the World, behind only American politician Bernie Sanders. The same year, Forbes listed the group at number 54 on their annual list of Celebrity 100, having earned $44 million from June 2015 to June 2016 and becoming the first Korean act to appear on the list; the group had the third highest annual earnings ever for a boy band, behind only One Direction and Backstreet Boys. BigBang was named one of the most influential artists of the Hallyu Wave by The Korea Herald and among the acts that best represent K-pop, as well as the "Top Male Idol Group in the Past 20 Years" in The Dong-A Ilbo's survey of both the Korean public and music critics. Additionally, BigBang were the highest ranking musicians in JoongAng Ilbo's "Most Powerful Figures In Korean Entertainment" list, placing fourth. In 2017, they became the first Korean artists to be included on Forbes 30 Under 30 list of musicians. Singles released by the group such as "Lies" and "Fantastic Baby" are often considered some of K-pop's biggest hits and most iconic songs. In their list of "The 21 Greatest K-Pop Songs of All Time", Spin magazine ranks "Bad Boy" at number thirteen and "High High" by the duo GD & TOP at number seven. "Fantastic Baby" ranked at number twenty-two on Rolling Stone's "50 Greatest Boy Band Songs of All Time" list. It placed second on Stereogum's list of "Best K-pop Videos", with "Love Song" at thirteenth. "Lies" was also chosen as the "Song of the Decade" by Mnet's M! Countdown in 2014 and voted the "Top Male Idol Song in the Past 20 Years" in a Dong-a Ilbo survey that also ranked "Bae Bae", "Fantastic Baby" and "Haru Haru" at fourth, fifth and sixth, respectively. "Fantastic Baby" was included in "The 100 Greatest Music Videos of the 2010s" by Billboard, which deemed the song one of K-pop's most impactful videos of all time. "Bad Boy", "Bae Bae" and "Fantastic Baby" were listed at eighth, 40th and 65th, respectively on Billboard''s "The 100 Greatest K-Pop Songs of the 2010s".

=== Music ===
BigBang's music has influenced numerous artists, including BTS, Pixie Lott, A*M*E, Cho PD, Got7, Astro, Teen Top, Monsta X, Chang Kiha, SF9, Victon, Dynamic Duo, Zion T., Sonamoo, Topp Dogg, Nu'est, Mamamoo's Hwasa, Loona's Vivi, Secret Number's Jinny, Block B's U-Kwon, iKon, Blackpink, Sơn Tùng M-TP and Grimes. Chinese boy band OkBang was specifically fashioned after BigBang and was described as having "many similarities to Big Bang in terms of musical style, wardrobe and hairstyles." Filipino singer-actress Glaiza de Castro also draws inspiration from BigBang and their stage presence. Rapper BewhY, the winner of Show Me the Money 5, revealed that he started rapping after listening to BigBang, while IU started gaining domestic popularity after covering songs by the group.

== Accolades and achievements ==
BigBang is one of the highest selling boy groups of all time, selling 150 million records and counting. The group has released multiple hit songs, the Gaon Chart reporting that music consumers have learned to trust the group's quality and calling them a "phenomenon" because their material is "consumed evenly by a variety of age groups." BigBang won several Song of the Year awards at numerous award shows, including at the 13th Korean Music Awards for "Bae Bae" and at the 30th Golden Disc Awards for "Loser". They were crowned Artist of the Year at the 17th Seoul Music Awards in 2008 and at the 7th Melon Music Awards in 2015 and became the first artist to win more than one Artist of the Year Award from the Mnet Asian Music Awards (2008, 2012, and 2015). The group also won multiple Best New Artist awards in the early days of their career in Japan. They became the first and only Korean act to win at the MTV Italian Music Awards, when they took home the Best Artist from the World award in 2016. The group has been honored as the Most Influential Group in Asia at the 5th Gaon Chart K-Pop Awards and with a Special Achievement award at the 58th Japan Record Awards.

The group's albums Hot Issue (2007), Stand Up (2008), Remember (2008), Tonight (2011) and Alive (2012) were also cited as some of the most successful digital albums in history. In 2014, the tenth anniversary of the digital music market release in South Korea, BigBang was revealed to be the act with the second-most digital number one songs in history. With the Made singles in 2015, they became the first. Their breakthrough hit was 2007's "Lies", the first song to spend over 50 weeks on the Melon Chart, including 22 weeks in the Top 10; it remained in the top 100 for over 54 weeks. Their follow-up single "Last Farewell" tied the all-time record for the most weeks spent at number one on Melon, topping the chart for eight consecutive weeks. In 2011, BigBang reached the top of Cyworld's Hall of Fame, making them the best selling artist of all time on the chart. Tonight became the first K-pop album to reach the Top 10 on the US iTunes chart. In 2015, they became the first act to have three songs in the top five of the Gaon Digital Year End Chart, as well as the first act to hold the first and second spots simultaneously in the same year. They also became the first act to top the Gaon Digital Chart for four consecutive months. Their third studio album Made (2016) was certified Diamond by the Chinese music service QQ Music and became one of the best-selling albums of all time in China. In 2016, "Lies" and "Haru Haru" were, respectively, the second and the fifth most downloaded songs in South Korea since 2006. They also became the first Korean act to have nine music videos exceed 100 million YouTube views, and the music video for "Fantastic Baby" became the first by a K-pop group to surpass 300 million views on YouTube.

Their first world tour set the record for highest ticket sales in Taiwan, while their London shows gathered the largest crowd for a K-pop concert held in the UK. Their Japan Dome Tour in 2013 was the highest-grossing tour by a foreign act in Japan. Additionally, their Made World Tour, the most attended tour headlined by a Korean act in history, broke several records at the time, including those the most viewed online K-pop concert in history, the first foreign act to hold a Japanese dome tour for three consecutive years, the only foreign act to hold three concerts in a row at the Shanghai Arena, the first Korean act to hold a two-day concert in Kuala Lumpur, the largest K-pop arena tour in United States history, the first foreign act to sell out three concerts in Hong Kong on two separate occasions, one of the most expensive concerts in Malaysian history, the largest tour in China by any Korean act, and the biggest K-pop concert staged in Canada. Behind-the-scenes footage from the tour was documented in their first film, Big Bang Made, which became the most viewed music documentary in Korea. Their tenth anniversary concert at the Seoul World Cup Stadium was attended by 65,000 people, the biggest audience ever for a single headlining act in the country. With their Last Dance Tour in 2017, BigBang became the first foreign act to hold a Japanese dome tour for five consecutive years.

== Members ==
Current

- Taeyang (태양) – vocalist
- G-Dragon (지드래곤) – leader, rapper
- Daesung (대성) – vocalist, drummer

Former

- T.O.P (탑) – rapper (2006–2023)
- Seungri (승리) – vocalist (2006–2019)

== Discography ==
=== Korean albums ===
- Big Bang Vol.1 (2006)
- Remember (2008)
- Made (2016)

=== Japanese albums ===
- Number 1 (2008)
- Big Bang (2009)
- Big Bang 2 (2011)
- Alive (2012)
- Made Series (2016)

== Filmography ==
- Big Bang Made (2016)

== Bibliography ==
- Shouting out to the World!, 쌤앤파커스 (January 28, 2009) ISBN 8992647603

== Tours and concerts ==
=== Concert tours ===
- Want You World tour (2007)
- Global Warning Tour (2008)
- Stand Up World Tour (2008)
- Electric Love Tour (2010)
- Love & Hope Tour (2011)
- Alive Galaxy World Tour (2012–2013)
- Japan Dome Tour (2013–2014)
- Japan Dome Tour "X" (2014–2015)
- Made World Tour (2015–2016)
- 0.TO.10 (2016–2017)
- Last Dance Tour (2017)
- XX: Cosmos World Tour (2026–2027)

=== Fan meeting tours ===
- Fantastic Babys (2012, 2014 & 2016)
- Made V.I.P Tour (2016)
- Big Bang Special Event (2016–2017)

=== YG Family tours ===
- 10th Anniversary World Tour (2006)
- 15th Anniversary Tour (2011–2012)
- Power World Tour (2014)

=== Music festivals ===
List of performances, showing dates, location, and relevant information
Event	Date	Venue	City	Country	Performed song(s)	Ref.
Coachella Valley Music and Arts Festival	April 12, 2026 – April 19, 2026	Empire Polo Club	Indio	United States	TBA	

=== Awards shows ===
List of performances, showing dates, location, and relevant information
Event	Date	Venue	City	Country	Performed song(s)	Ref.
2024 MAMA Awards	November 23, 2024	Kyocera Dome Osaka	Osaka	Japan	"Bang Bang Bang"; "Fantastic Baby"	

== See also ==
- Honorific nicknames in popular music

Preceded by Jero	Japan Record Award for Best New Artist; 2009	Succeeded by S/mileage
