= Last Dance Tour =

2017 Concert Tour by BigBang

- Continental tour by BigBang
- Location: Asia
- Start date: November 18, 2017
- End date: December 31, 2017
- Legs: 2
- No. of shows: 14 in Japan; 2 in South Korea; 16 in total

BigBang concert chronology
- 0.TO.10 (2016–17); Last Dance Tour (2017); XX: Cosmos World Tour (2026–27)

The Last Dance Tour was the sixth concert tour in Japan and eleventh overall by South Korean boy band BigBang. The tour began on November 18, 2017 in Fukuoka, Japan and concluded on December 31, 2017 in Seoul, South Korea. BigBang broke their own record by being the only foreign act to hold a dome-sized arena tour in Japan for the fifth consecutive year. The oldest member T.O.P did not perform on this tour due to his mandatory military service in South Korea which began in February 2017. This was also the final tour featuring Seungri prior to his retirement in 2019.

== Background ==
YG Entertainment announced on August 8, 2017 that BigBang will be holding their last tour in Japan before their upcoming hiatus due to South Korean mandatory military conscription. On the Last Dance Tour, BigBang became the very first foreign artist in Japan to hold a dome tour for the fifth consecutive year. BigBang performed 14 concerts across four cities: Fukuoka, Osaka, Nagoya, and Tokyo; a total of 696,000 fans attended the Japanese leg. As a result, BigBang's Dome Tour since 2013 attracted a total of 4,205,500 fans, a record for overseas singers. On October 19, the final shows of the tour was announced to be held at Gocheok Sky Dome in Seoul on December 30 and 31. Two shows from the tour, the Tokyo Dome concert on December 13 and the Seoul concert on December 30 is due to be broadcast live across 109 cinemas in Japan.

== Set lists ==
Japan
1. "Hands Up"
2. "Sober"
3. "We Like 2 Party"
4. "Fxxk It"
5. "Loser"
6. "Bad Boy"
7. "Wake Me Up" (Taeyang)
8. "Darling" (Taeyang)
9. "Superstar" (G-Dragon)
10. "Untitled, 2014" (G-Dragon)
11. "D-Day" (Daesung)
12. "あ・ぜ・ちょ！ (Azechou; Oh Why!)" (Daesung)
13. "Come To My" (Seungri)
14. "I Know" (Seungri)
15. "Look at Me Gwisoon" (Daesung & Seungri)
16. "Good Boy" (GD X Taeyang)
17. "If You"
18. "Day by Day"
19. "Fantastic Baby"
20. "Bang Bang Bang"

Encore

1. "My Heaven"
2. "Koe o Kikasete"
3. "Feeling"
4. "Bae Bae"
5. "Last Dance"
South Korea
1. "Hands Up"
2. "Sober"
3. "We Like 2 Party"
4. "Fxxk It"
5. "Loser"
6. "Bad Boy"
7. "Wake Me Up" (Taeyang)
8. "Darling" (Taeyang)
9. "Bullshit" (G-Dragon)
10. "Untitled, 2014" (G-Dragon)
11. "D-Day" (Daesung)
12. "あ・ぜ・ちょ！ (Azechou; Oh Why!)" (Daesung)
13. "Come To My" (Seungri)
14. "Strong Baby" (Seungri)
15. "Look at Me Gwisoon" (Daesung & Seungri)
16. "Good Boy" (GD X Taeyang)
17. "If You"
18. "Haru Haru"
19. "Fantastic Baby"
20. "Bang Bang Bang"

Encore

1. "Heaven"
2. "Lies"
3. "Feeling"
4. "Crooked"
5. "Bae Bae"
6. "Last Dance"

== Tour dates ==
Date	City	Country	Venue	Attendance
November 18, 2017	Fukuoka	Japan	Fukuoka Yahuoku! Dome	100,000
November 19, 2017	Fukuoka	Japan	Fukuoka Yahuoku! Dome	100,000
November 23, 2017	Osaka	Japan	Kyocera Dome	153,000
November 24, 2017	Osaka	Japan	Kyocera Dome	153,000
November 25, 2017	Osaka	Japan	Kyocera Dome	153,000
December 2, 2017	Nagoya	Japan	Nagoya Dome	81,500
December 3, 2017	Nagoya	Japan	Nagoya Dome	81,500
December 6, 2017	Tokyo	Japan	Tokyo Dome	165,000
December 7, 2017	Tokyo	Japan	Tokyo Dome	165,000
December 13, 2017	Tokyo	Japan	Tokyo Dome	165,000
December 21, 2017	Osaka	Japan	Kyocera Dome	196,500
December 22, 2017	Osaka	Japan	Kyocera Dome	196,500
December 23, 2017	Osaka	Japan	Kyocera Dome	196,500
December 24, 2017	Osaka	Japan	Kyocera Dome	196,500
December 30, 2017	Seoul	South Korea	Gocheok Sky Dome	70,000
December 31, 2017	Seoul	South Korea	Gocheok Sky Dome	70,000
Total				766,000
