= Big Bang Made =

- Theatrical release poster
- Directed by: Byun Jin Ho
- Produced by: Oh Dong Won; Yang Min-suk (Executive supervisor); Yang Hyun-suk (Executive producer)
- Starring: Big Bang
- Production company: YG Entertainment
- Distributed by: CGV
- Release dates: June 28, 2016 (CGV Yeongdeungpo); June 30, 2016
- Running time: 122 minutes
- Country: South Korea
- Language: Korean
- Box office: $1.5 million

Big Bang Made is a 2016 South Korean documentary film featuring popular boy band Big Bang on their tour, the Made World Tour in 2015, which became the most attended tour headlined by a Korean act in history. It was released in South Korea and Japan on June 30, 2016. It is the band's first film, released to celebrate the tenth anniversary of their debut.

== Synopsis ==
In April 2015, BigBang made a comeback after a three-year hiatus as a group, and their Made World Tour ended with a great success drawing 1.5 million people worldwide. The movie follows BigBang from the beginning till the end of their world tour in a documentary format to give up close and personal view of their 340 day long journey on tour as they perform in 32 cities across 13 countries. The movie shows the five singers off guard in their natural state, having fun on-stage during the concerts, as well as behind-the-scenes footage of the tour. The film also included interviews with each member.

== Cast ==
- Kwon Ji-yong as G-DRAGON, leader songwriter and rapper
- Choi Seung-hyun as T.O.P, former member and rapper
- Dong Young-bae as TAEYANG, vocalist
- Kang Dae-sung as DAESUNG, vocalist
- Lee Seung-hyun as SEUNGRI, former member and singer
- Gee Eun
- Kim Tae Hyun
- Lim Hea Kyung
- Lee Jae Wook
- Jeung Chi Young
- Leroy A Bennett
- Ed Burke

== Release and reception ==
"Big Bang shines the most when they are just being themselves. The movie is a collection of such moments. Without any artificial setting, the camera follows Big Bang members and records them in their most natural state. As a result, viewers can see Big Bang members not only as artist but also just as guys next door."

— Big Bang 10

YG Entertainment released a series of teasers in anticipation of the movie release. On June 20, the first teaser was released with preview of G-Dragon interview, followed by Taeyang, T.O.P, Daesung, and Seungri each day after till June 24. Big Bang Made premiered at the CGV Yeongdeungpo in Seoul on June 28, 2016.

The film was released in 2D and also in a Screen X version at CGV theaters. In addition to South Korea and Japan, the movie will receive a limited release in ten other countries including Singapore, Thailand, and United States.

In South Korea, the movie drew 15,000 viewers across Korea in the first four days. In the six days, the film earned $229,491 from 31,384 viewers from 53 theatres. On July 14, the movie surpassed 50,000 viewers, making it the most viewed music documentary in Korea. In Japan, the movie was screened across 51 theatres, drawing 50,000 viewers in the first four days. The movie drew 120,000 viewers in Japan in total.

The film was released online in China through Tencent QQ on July 25, and within 24 hours it was watched by over 10 million people.
