= Koe o Kikasete (Big Bang song) =

Single by BigBang

from the album Big Bang 2
- Language: Japanese
- B-side: "Ora Yeah!"
- Released: November 4, 2009
- Genre: J-pop; J-hip hop
- Length: 4:13
- Label: YG; UMJ
- Songwriters: Yamamoto Narumi; Robin
- Producer: Teddy

BigBang singles chronology
"Bringing You Love" (2009)	"Koe o Kikasete" (2009)	"Lollipop Pt. 2" (2010)

Music video
- "Koe wo Kikasete" on YouTube

"Koe o Kikasete" (声をきかせて; lit. Let Me Hear Your Voice) is the third Japanese single by the South Korean boy band BigBang released under YG Entertainment and Universal Music Japan seven months after their single "Gara Gara Go!!". It is also the soundtrack for the TBS drama おひとりさま ("Ohitorisama").

The song was certified gold as a digital download to cellphones by the RIAJ in April 2011, a year and a half after its release.

== Track listing ==
Koe o Kikasete – CD single edition
No.	Title	Length
1.	"Koe o Kikasete" (声をきかせて) (Let Me Hear Your Voice)	4:13
2.	"Ora Yeah!" (オラ Yeah!)	3:01
3.	"Koe o Kikasete" (Club Mix)	5:19
Total length:		12:38

Koe o Kikasete – CD single + DVD edition
No.	Title	Length
1.	"Koe o Kikasete" (声をきかせて) (Let Me Hear Your Voice)	4:16
2.	"Ora Yeah!" (オラ Yeah!)	3:05
3.	"Koe o Kikasete" (Acoustic Version)	4:18
Total length:		11:37

CD+DVD Edition – DVD bonus tracks
No.	Title	Length
1.	"Koe o Kikasete" (Music Video)
2.	"Koe o Kikasete" (Music Video - Making of)

== Certifications ==
Certifications for "Koe o Kikasete"
Region	Certification	Certified units/sales
Japan (RIAJ)	Platinum	250,000^{*}
Streaming
Japan (RIAJ)	Gold	50,000,000^{†}
^{*} Sales figures based on certification alone.^{†} Streaming-only figures based on certification alone.

== Release history ==
Region	Date	Format	Label
Japan	November 4, 2009	CD single; CD single + DVD	YG; Universal Music Japan
Taiwan	November 13, 2009	CD single + DVD	Universal Music Taiwan
