= BigBang videography =

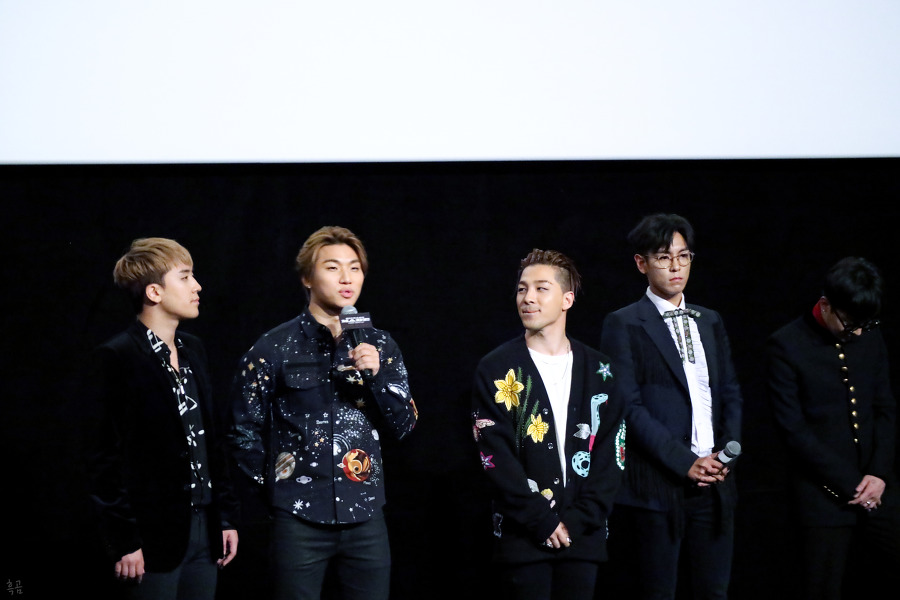
Big Bang at the premiere of their movie Big Bang Made on June 28, 2016

South Korean boy band Big Bang have released twenty-seven concerts video albums, forty music videos, four music video compilations, and one documentary DVD. The group has sold over a million physical DVDs/Blu-rays in Japan.

== Music videos ==
=== As lead artist ===
Year	Title	Album	Director(s)
2006	"We Belong Together"	BIGBANG	—N/a
2006	"A Fool's Only Tears"	BIGBANG	—N/a
2006	"This Love"	BIGBANG	—N/a
2006	"La-La-La"	Bigbang is V.I.P	—N/a
2006	"Ma Girl"	Bigbang is V.I.P	—N/a
2006	"Forever With U"	Big Bang 03	—N/a
2006	"Good-bye Baby"	Big Bang 03	—N/a
2006	"Dirty Cash"	Bigbang Vol.1	—N/a
2007	"Lies"	Always	Cha Eun-taek
2007	"Always"	Always	—N/a
2007	"Last Farewell"	Hot Issue	—N/a
2008	"Haru Haru"	Stand Up	—N/a
2008	"My Heaven"	Stand Up	—N/a
2008	"Oh My Friend"	Stand Up	—N/a
2008	"Number 1"	Number 1	—N/a
2008	"With U"	Number 1	—N/a
2008	"How Gee"	Number 1	—N/a
2008	"Sunset Glow"	Remember	—N/a
2009	"Gara Gara Go!"	Big Bang	—N/a
2009	"Koe o Kikasete"	Big Bang 2	Yong Ih
2010	"Lollipop Pt. 2"	Digital single	—N/a
2010	"Tell Me Goodbye"	Big Bang 2	—N/a
2010	"Beautiful Hangover"	Big Bang 2	Yong Ih
2011	"Tonight"	Tonight	—N/a
2011	"Love Song"	Tonight	Han Sa Min
2011	"The North Face"	—N/a	—N/a
2012	"Blue"	Alive	Han Sa Min
2012	"Fantastic Baby"	Alive	Seo Hyun-seung
2012	"Bad Boy"	Alive	Han Sa Min
2012	"Monster"	Still Alive	Han Sa Min
2015	"Loser"	Made	Han Sa Min
2015	"Bae Bae"	Made	Seo Hyun-seung
2015	"Bang Bang Bang"	Made	Seo Hyun-seung
2015	"We Like 2 Party"	Made	Han Sa Min, BigBang
2015	"Sober"	Made	Han Sa Min
2015	"Let's Not Fall In Love"	Made	Han Sa Min
2015	"Zutter"	Made	Seo Hyun-seung
2016	"Fxxk It"	Made	Seo Hyun-seung
2016	"Last Dance"	Made	Han Sa Min
2022	"Still Life"	—N/a	Han Sa Min

=== Collaborations ===
Year	Title	Artist(s)	Album	Director(s)
2009	"Lollipop"	BIGBANG & 2NE1	2NE1	—N/a

== Video albums ==
=== Concert tour videos ===
Title	Album details	Peak chart positions		Sales & Certifications
Title	Album details	JPN DVD	JPN Blu-ray	Sales & Certifications
2009 BIGBANG Live Concert ‘BIG SHOW’	Released: August 19, 2009 (JPN); Re-released: March 19, 2014; Language: Japanese; Labels: YG Entertainment; Format: DVD	5	—	—N/a
Stand Up Tour	Released: March 17, 2010 (JPN); Language: Korean; Label: YG Entertainment, Universal Music Japan; Format: DVD	16	—	—N/a
2008 BIGBANG Live Concert "Global Warning Tour"	Released: March 31, 2010 (JPN); Language: Korean; Labels: YG Entertainment, Universal Music Japan; Format: DVD	9	—	—N/a
Electric Love Tour 2010	Released: April 28, 2010 (JPN); Re-released: September 29, 2012; Languages: Korean, Japanese; Labels: YG Entertainment, Universal Music Japan; Format: DVD	6	—	JPN: 41,000
BIGSHOW BIGBANG Live Concert 2010	Released: October 27, 2010 (JPN); Re-released: March 19, 2014; Language: Japanese; Labels: YG Entertainment; Format: DVD	2	—	—N/a
BIGBANG Present “Love & Hope Tour 2011”	Released: December 14, 2011 (JPN); Re-released: 26 September 2012; Language: Japanese; Labels: YG Entertainment, Universal Music Japan; Format: DVD	4	76	JPN: 60,000
2012 BIGBANG Live Concert DVD - Alive Tour in Seoul	Released: January 29, 2013 (KOR/TWN); Languages: Korean; Labels: YG Entertainment; Format: DVD	—	—	—N/a
2012 BIGBANG Alive Tour in Seoul	Released: February 6, 2013 (JPN); Language: Japanese; Labels: YG Entertainment, YGEX; Format: DVD	2	—	JPN: 19,000
BIGBANG Alive Tour 2012 in JAPAN: Special Final in Dome -Tokyo Dome-	Released: March 20, 2013 (JPN); Language: Korean, Japanese; Editions: Standard, Deluxe; Labels: YG Entertainment, YGEX; Format: DVD, Blu-ray	2	2	JPN: 100,000 (DVD); JPN: 20,468 (Blu-ray); RIAJ: Gold
2012~2013 BIGBANG Alive GALAXY Tour DVD [The Final in Seoul & World Tour]	Released: July 24, 2013 (JPN); Language: Korean, Japanese; Labels: YG Entertainment, YGEX; Format: DVD	3	—	JPN: 13,084
2013 BIGBANG Alive Galaxy Tour DVD - The Final in Seoul	Released: July 24, 2013 (KOR); Language: Korean; Labels: YG Entertainment; Format: DVD	3	—	—N/a
2012~2013 BIGBANG Alive Galaxy Tour DVD	Released: July 24, 2013 (KOR); Language: Korean; Labels: YG Entertainment; Format: DVD	—	—	—N/a
2011 BIGBANG Live Concert	Released: March 19, 2014 (JPN); Language: Japanese; Labels: YG Entertainment, YGEX; Format: DVD	53	—	—N/a
BIGBANG Japan Dome Tour 2013~2014	Released: March 19, 2014 (JPN); Language: Korean, Japanese; Editions: Standard, Deluxe; Labels: YG Entertainment, YGEX; Format: DVD, Blu-ray	1	3	JPN: 100,000 (DVD); JPN: 25,770 (Blu-ray); RIAJ: Gold
2014 BIGBANG +α Concert in Seoul	Released: July 2, 2014 (KOR/JPN/TWN); Language: Korean, Japanese; Labels: YG Entertainment, YGEX; Format: DVD	5	—	JPN: 72,000
2008 BIGBANG Live Concert Global Warning Tour	Released: January 21, 2015 (JPN); Language: Japanese; Labels: YG Entertainment, YGEX; Format: DVD	40	—	—N/a
BIGBANG Japan Dome Tour 2014-2015 'X'	Released: March 25, 2015 (JPN); Language: Korean, Japanese; Labels: YG Entertainment, YGEX; DVD, Blu-ray	1	2	JPN: 108,474; RIAJ: Gold
BIGBANG 2015 World Tour ～2016 [MADE] In Seoul	Released: February 2, 2016 (KOR); Language: Korean, Japanese; Labels: YG Entertainment, YGEX; Format: DVD	6	—	KOR: 1,201; JPN: 7,711
BIGBANG 2015 World Tour ～2016 [MADE] In Japan	Released: February 24, 2016 (JPN); Language: Korean, Japanese; Labels: YG Entertainment, YGEX; Format: DVD, Blu-ray	1	2	JPN: 96,529
BIGBANG 2015 World Tour ～2016 [MADE] In Japan: The Final	Released: July 20, 2016 (JPN); Labels: YG Entertainment, YGEX; DVD, Blu-ray	1	1	JPN: 55,132
BIGBANG10 The Concert : 0.TO.10 In Japan	Released: November 2, 2016 (JPN); Labels: YG Entertainment, YGEX; DVD, Blu-ray	1	1	JPN: 78,625
BIGBANG10 The Concert : 0.TO.10 In Seoul	Released: February 8, 2017 (JPN); Labels: YG Entertainment, YGEX; DVD	5	—	KOR: 2,946; JPN: 3,905
BIGBANG10 The Concert : 0.TO.10 -The Final-	Released: March 22, 2017 (JPN); Labels: YG Entertainment, YGEX; DVD, Blu-ray	1	1	JPN: 64,926
Big Bang 10 The Concert 0.TO.10 Final In Seoul Live	Released (KOR): May 25, 2017 (CD, DVD); June 15, 2017 (CD, Blu-ray); Label: YG Entertainment; DVD, Blu-ray	—	—	—N/a
Big Bang Special Event 2017	Released: January 17, 2018 (JPN); Labels: YG Entertainment, YGEX; DVD, Blu-ray	3	5	JPN: 23,364
Big Bang Japan Dome Tour 2017 -Last Dance-	Released: March 14, 2018 (JPN); Labels: YG Entertainment, YGEX; DVD, Blu-ray	1	2	JPN: 59,748
Big Bang Concert Last Dance in Seoul	Released (KOR): April 30, 2018 (DVD); May 15, 2018 (Blu-ray); Labels: YG Entertainment; DVD, Blu-ray	—	—	KOR: 3,381
Big Bang Japan Dome Tour 2017 -Last Dance-: The Final	Released: August 17, 2018 (JPN); Labels: YG Entertainment, YGEX; DVD, Blu-ray	1	1	JPN: 21,653
"—" denotes releases that did not chart or were not released in that region.

=== Documentaries ===
Title	Album details	Peak chart positions		Sales & Certifications
Title	Album details	JPN DVD	JPN Blu-ray	Sales & Certifications
BIGBANG 1st Documentary DVD <Extra Ordinary 20’S>	Released: June 25, 2012 (JPN); Re-released: June 25, 2014; Language: Japanese; Labels: YG Entertainment, YGEX; Format: DVD	27	—	—N/a

=== Music video compilations ===
Title	Album details	Peak chart positions		Sales & Certifications
Title	Album details	JPN DVD	JPN Blu-ray	Sales & Certifications
BIGBANG The Clips Vol. 1	Released: December 23, 2009 (JPN); Languages: Korean, Japanese; Labels: YG Entertainment, Universal Music Japan; Format: DVD	21	96	—N/a
BIGBANG The Clips Vol.1 (10.09)	Released: September 22, 2010 (JPN); Languages: Korean, Japanese; Labels: YG Entertainment; Format: DVD	34	—	—N/a
BIGBANG Best Music Video Collection 2006 - 2012 -Korea Edition-	Released: February 13, 2013 (JPN); Language: Korean, Japanese; Labels: YG Entertainment, YGEX; Format: DVD	3	—	JPN: 18,000
BIGBANG Best M/V Making Film Collection 2006 - 2012 -Korea Edition-	Released: June 28, 2013 (KOR); Language: Korean; Labels: YG Entertainment; Format: DVD	—	—	—N/a

=== Other releases ===
Title	Album details	Peak chart positions	Sales & Certifications
Title	Album details	JPN DVD	Sales & Certifications
2009・2010 BIGSHOW Making DVD & Book Special Repackage	Released: October 27, 2010 (JPN); Languages: Korean, Japanese; Labels: YG Entertainment, Universal Music Japan; Format: DVD	11	JPN: 41,000
BIGBANG Making DVD + Calendar & Diary	Released: December 29, 2010 (JPN); Languages: Korean, Japanese; Labels: YG Entertainment; Format: DVD	17	—N/a
2011 BIGBANG Live Concert DVD Making DVD + Photo book	Released: June 29, 2011 (JPN); Language: Japanese; Labels: YG Entertainment, Universal Music Japan; Format: DVD	4	—N/a
BIGBANG’s Alive 2012 Making Collection	Released: August 22, 2012 (JPN); Language: Japanese; Labels: YG Entertainment; Format: DVD	3	—N/a
BIGBANG Early Days in Japan ~filmed by MEZAMASHI TV~	Released: December 3, 2014 (JPN); Language: Japanese; Labels: YG Entertainment, YGEX; Format: DVD	4	—N/a
BIGBANG'S 2015 Welcoming Collection DVD	Released: March 25, 2015 (JPN); Language: Japanese; Labels: YG Entertainment, YGEX; Format: DVD	5	—N/a
BIGBANG's 2016 Welcoming Collection	Released: March 2, 2016 (JPN); Labels: YG Entertainment, YGEX; Format: DVD	2	JPN: 9,045
BIGBANG's 2017 Welcoming Collection	Released: March 29, 2017 (JPN); Labels: YG Entertainment, YGEX; Format: DVD	2	JPN: 8,356

=== Featured releases ===
Title	Album details	Peak chart positions		Sales & Certifications
Title	Album details	JPN DVD	JPN Blu-ray	Sales & Certifications
2008 Mnet KM Music Festival-10th Anniversary-	Released: May 13, 2009 (JPN); Language: Japanese; Labels: Rhythm Zone; Format: DVD	12	—	—N/a
YG Family Making Film & Calendar + Diary	Released: December 29, 2010 (JPN); Language: Japanese; Labels: Universal Music Japan; Format: DVD	14	—	—N/a
YG Family Live Concert 2010 DVD+MAKING BOOK	Released: June 1, 2011 (JPN); Language: Japanese; Labels: Universal Music Japan; Format: DVD	14	—	—N/a
Seoul Tokyo Music Festival 2010	Released: September 7, 2011 (JPN); Language: Japanese; Labels: Universal Music Japan; Format: DVD	32	—	—N/a
15th Anniversary YG Family Concert in Seoul 2011	Released: June 13, 2012 (JPN); Language: Japanese; Labels: YGEX; Format: DVD	10	—	—N/a
2012 YG Family Concert in Japan	Released: August 8, 2012 (JPN); Language: Japanese; Labels: YGEX; Format: DVD	3	—	—N/a
YG Family World Tour 2014 -Power- in Japan	Released: January 7, 2015 (JPN); Language: Japanese; Labels: YGEX; Format: DVD, Blu-ray	2	8	JPN: 13,058

== Filmography ==
=== Documentaries ===
Year	Type	Title	Production company	Notes
2006	TV show	Big Bang: The Beginning	MTV Korea	Documentary showing their training process and the formation of the group
2016	Movie	Big Bang MADE: The Movie	YG Entertainment	Behind the scenes of their world tour. It became the most viewed music documentary in Korean history.
2016	TV documentary	Big Bang MADE: The Documentary	SBS	Additional footage not included in Big Bang Made

=== Drama parodies ===
Year	Original Drama	Role				
Year	Original Drama	G-Dragon	T.O.P	Seungri	Daesung	Taeyang
2007	The 1st Shop of Coffee Prince	Go Eun-chan	Choi Han-kyul	Jin Ha-rim/Han Yoo-joo	Hwang Min-yeop	Choi Han-sung
2009	Beethoven Virus	Kang Gun-woo	T.O.P Mae	Du Ru-mi	Kang Dae-soon/cleaning lady	Bae Yong-gi
2009	Boys Over Flowers	Hanazawa Rui	Domyoji Tsukasa	Mimisaka Akira	Makino Tsukushi	Nishikado Sojiro
2011	Secret Garden	G Ra-im	Kim Joo-top	Seung-ska	Secretary Kang	Tae Jong-soo, a team leader

=== Reality shows ===
Year	Title	Production company	Notes
2011	Big Bang TV	Mnet	TV show
2017	Run, BIGBANG Scout!	YouTube Premium	YouTube exclusive

== See also ==
- Big Bang discography
