= Daesung discography =

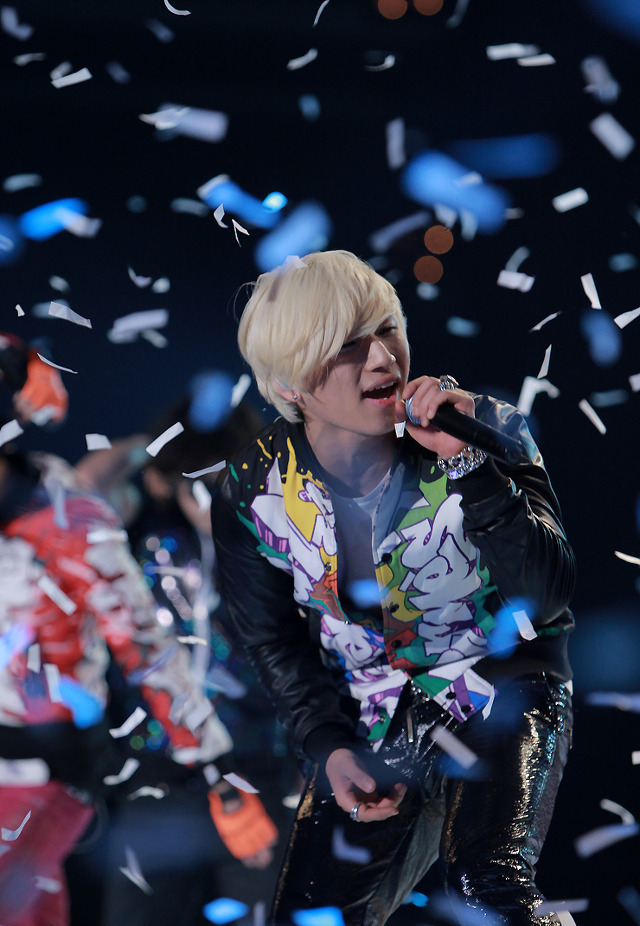
- Daesung in K-Collection fashion show 2012
- Studio albums: 2
- EPs: 4
- Singles: 12
- Video albums: 4

This is the discography of South Korean singer Daesung, who debuted as a member of the boy band Big Bang in 2006. After releasing multiple digital singles in his home country, his career shifted its focus to Japan, where he has currently released two Japanese studio albums, three Japanese extended plays, and several other singles and video albums.

== Studio albums ==
Title	Album details	Peak chart positions	Sales
Title	Album details	JPN	Sales
D'scover	Released: February 27, 2013; Language: Japanese; Label: YGEX; Format: CD, DVD, digital	2	JPN: 55,334
D'slove	Released: July 16, 2014; Language: Japanese; Label: YGEX; Format: CD, DVD, digital	2	JPN: 45,205

== Extended plays ==
Title	Details	Peak chart positions		Sales
Title	Details	KOR	JPN	Sales
Delight	Released: October 29, 2014; Language: Japanese; Label: YGEX; Format: CD, DVD, digital	—	1	JPN: 79,853
D-Day	Released: April 12, 2017; Language: Japanese; Label: YGEX; Format: CD, DVD, Blu-ray, digital	—	1	JPN: 55,171
Delight 2	Released: December 20, 2017; Language: Japanese; Label: YGEX; Format: CD, DVD, Blu-ray, digital	—	3	JPN: 47,500
D's Wave	Released: April 8, 2025; Language: Korean; Label: RND Company; Format: CD, digital	8	—	KOR: 36,879

== Singles ==
=== As lead artist ===
Title	Year	Peak chart positions				Sales	Album
Title	Year	KOR	KOR Hot	JPN	JPN Hot	Sales	Album
Korean
"Try Smiling"	2006	—	—	—	—	—N/a	Since 2007
"Look at Me, Gwisoon"	2008	—	—	—	56	KOR: 28,935	Non-album singles
"A Big Hit"	2009	—	—	—	—	—N/a	Non-album singles
"Cotton Candy"	2010	6	—	—	—	—N/a	Non-album singles
"Baby Don't Cry"	2011	30	—	—	—	KOR: 368,679	Tonight
"Lunatic"	2011	51	68	—	—	KOR: 187,651	What's Up OST
"Wings"	2012	8	13	—	—	KOR: 1,096,474	Alive
"Flow" (흘러간다)	2023	—	—	—	—	—N/a	Non-album singles
"Falling Slowly"	2024	—	—	—	—	—N/a	Non-album singles
"Universe"	2025	118	—	—	—	—N/a	D's Wave
"Hando-Chogua" (한도초과)	2025	— (Note: "Hando-Chogua" did not enter the Circle Digital Chart, but peaked at number 9 on the component Circle Download Chart.)	—	—	—	—N/a	Non-album single
Japanese
"I Love You"	2013	—	—	5	13	JPN: 34,644	D'slove
"D-Day"	2017	—	*	—	—	—N/a	D-Day
"—" denotes releases that did not chart or were not released in that region.

=== As featured artist ===
Title	Year	Peak positions									Sales	Album
Title	Year	KOR	HK	JPN Hot	MLY	NZ Hot	SGP	TWN	US D/E	WW	Sales	Album
"Now We" (Nemo featuring Daesung)	2007	—	—	—	—	—	—	—	—	—	—N/a	Non-album singles
"Family Day" (with Family Outing cast)	2008	—	—	—	—	—	—	—	—	—	—N/a	Non-album singles
"How Did We Get" (Lee Hyori featuring Daesung)	2010	8	—	—	—	—	—	—	—	—	—N/a	H-Logic
"To You My Beloved" (親愛なる君へ) (Gummy featuring D-lite)	2013	—	—	—	—	—	—	—	—	—	—N/a	Fate(s)
"Home Sweet Home" (G-Dragon featuring Taeyang and Daesung)	2024	1	2	21	3	17	4	2	23	27	JPN: 5,478; WW: 8,000	Übermensch
"—" denotes releases that did not chart or were not released in that region.

== Video albums ==
Title	Album details	Peak positions		Sales
Title	Album details	JPN DVD	JPN Blu-ray	Sales
D-LITE D’scover Tour 2013 in Japan ～DLive～	Released: October 30, 2013; Label: YG Entertainment, YGEX; Format: CD, DVD, Blu-ray, digital download	5	9	JPN: 13,562
D-LITE DLive 2014 in Japan ～D’slove～	Released: October 22, 2014; Label: YG Entertainment, YGEX; Format: CD, DVD, Blu-ray, digital download	6	17	—N/a
Encore!! 3D Tour [D-LITE DLive D'slove]	Released: January 27, 2016; Label: YG Entertainment, YGEX; Format: CD, DVD, Blu-ray, digital download	11	22	JPN: 12,366
D-Lite Japan Dome Tour 2017 ~D-Day~	Released: September 6, 2017; Label: YG Entertainment, YGEX; Format: CD, DVD, Blu-ray, digital download	5	6	JPN: 11,822
D-Lite DNA Show Vol.1	Released: May 16, 2018; Label: YG Entertainment, YGEX; Format: CD, DVD, Blu-ray, digital download	4	3	JPN: 5,337
"—" denotes releases that did not chart or were not released in that region.

== See also ==
- BigBang discography
