= Daesung =

South Korean singer (born 1989)

- 강대성
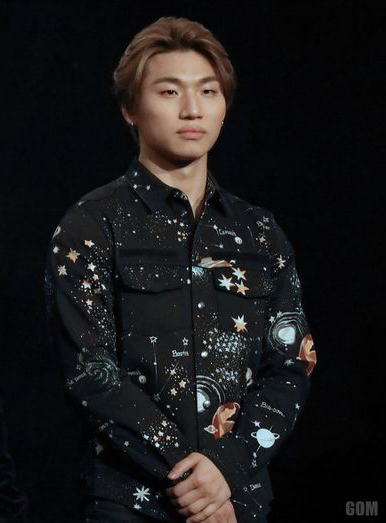
- Daesung at the premiere of Big Bang Made on June 28, 2016
- Born: Kang Dae-sung; April 26, 1989 (age 37); Seoul, South Korea
- Other name: D-Lite
- Occupations: Singer; songwriter; television personality
- Musical career
- Genres: K-pop; R&B; trot; rock
- Instruments: Vocals; drums
- Years active: 2006–present
- Labels: YG; RND; YGEX
- Member of: Big Bang
- Formerly of: YG Family

Korean name
- Hangul: 강대성
- Hanja: 姜大聲
- RR: Gang Daeseong
- MR: Kang Taesŏng

Signature
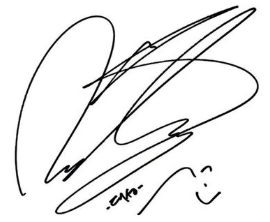

Kang Dae-sung (Korean: 강대성; born April 26, 1989), better known mononymously as Daesung and his Japanese stage name D-Lite, is a South Korean singer who made his musical debut in 2006 as a member of the South Korean boy band Big Bang. He debuted as a solo artist in South Korea with the number one trot song "Look at Me, Gwisoon" in 2008. Since the inception of the Gaon Digital Chart in 2010, Daesung achieved two Top 10 songs, the digital single "Cotton Candy" and "Wings" from the BigBang album Alive (2012).

In 2013, he released his first solo album in Japan, D'scover and embarked on his first Japanese tour. The following year, he released two more albums, D'slove and his first chart-topper, Delight. D'slove Tour made him the first Korean soloist to gather over 100,000 fans for two Japanese tours in a row. In 2017, he held his first solo Japanese dome tour, performing for over 150,000 people from four shows and released his second number one album, D-Day, that made him the second foreign male solo artist to have two consecutive number one albums in Japan after Michael Jackson.

In South Korean television, he was a part of the main cast of the top-rated comedy show Family Outing from 2008 to 2010, the musical drama series What's Up (2011) and was one of the hosts of the talk show Night After Night (2010).

== Life and career ==
=== 1989–2007: Early life and debut with Big Bang ===
Kang Dae-sung was born in Seoul's Itaewon neighborhood and from a young age, he acquired an interest in becoming a singer. To overcome the objection of his parents who were strongly against the idea, he left home for a week to get his permission. Kang continued to pursue his goal and was recruited by YG Entertainment as a trainee after succeeding in an audition. Later, he started using his first name, Daesung, as his stage name and was paired with five more trainees (G-Dragon, T.O.P, Taeyang, Seungri and Hyunseung) to integrate the formation of the boy group Big Bang. The formation of the group was documented on television, but prior to their official debut, Hyunseung was dropped and BigBang debuted in 2006 with five members. BigBang made their first appearance as a group on August 19, 2006, at YG Family's 10th Anniversary concert.

BigBang's debut was fairly successful, with their first studio album, Big Bang Vol.1 – Since 2007, getting sales of over 100,000 copies. The album also contains Daesung's first solo song "Try Smiling" (웃어본다; Useo Bonda) and was preceded by three single albums: "Big Bang", "Big Bang Is V.I.P" and "Big Bang 03", released the same year. The group's breakthrough came with the release of their first extended play, Always (2007), which included the number one single "Lies" (거짓말; Geojitmal). The song went on to top major Korean music charts for a record-breaking seven consecutive weeks^{[3]} and won the group the Song of the Year award at the 9th Mnet Korean Music Festival.^{[4]} Their following EPs followed its predecessor's footsteps: Hot Issue yielded "Last Farewell" (마지막 인사; Majimak Insa) while Stand Up spawned "Day by Day" (하루하루; Haru Haru); both singles were chart-toppers.

Shortly after the debut of BigBang, Daesung was diagnosed with voice chord nodules and developed sociophobia and stage fright. However, he was able to recover with the help of fellow singer and label-mate Gummy, who had been previously diagnosed with the illness.

=== 2008–2009: Solo career development, Family Outing and Cats ===
Daesung released his first trot single "Look at Me, Gwisoon" (날봐, 귀순; Nal Bwa Gwisun) in 2008. He stated that although he was worried about dampening the group's image, he wanted to try something different. The same year, he joined the SBS reality variety show Family Outing as a permanent cast member. He also made his musical debut in Korean production of Cats, playing the role of Rum Tum Tugger. Daesung then became a host for MBC's music program Show! Music Core, alongside fellow member Seungri.

Daesung released his second trot single titled "Big Hit" (대박이야; Daebakiya) in 2009. He was also scheduled to join bandmate Seungri in the autobiographical musical Shouting. In August 2009, however, Daesung was injured in a car accident shortly before the musical opened. He was returning to Seoul from a filming location for Family Outing when the accident occurred on the Pyeongtaek Express highway, Gyeonggi Province. The van hit the guardrail as it skidded in the pouring rain, according to YG Entertainment. Daesung, who was in the passenger seat, broke his nose, injured his back and sustained minor bruises on his face and arms. Daesung fully recovered and made his return to BigBang in October 2009, joining the group to perform at the Dream Concert.

=== 2010–2012: What's Up, Night After Night and solo songs ===
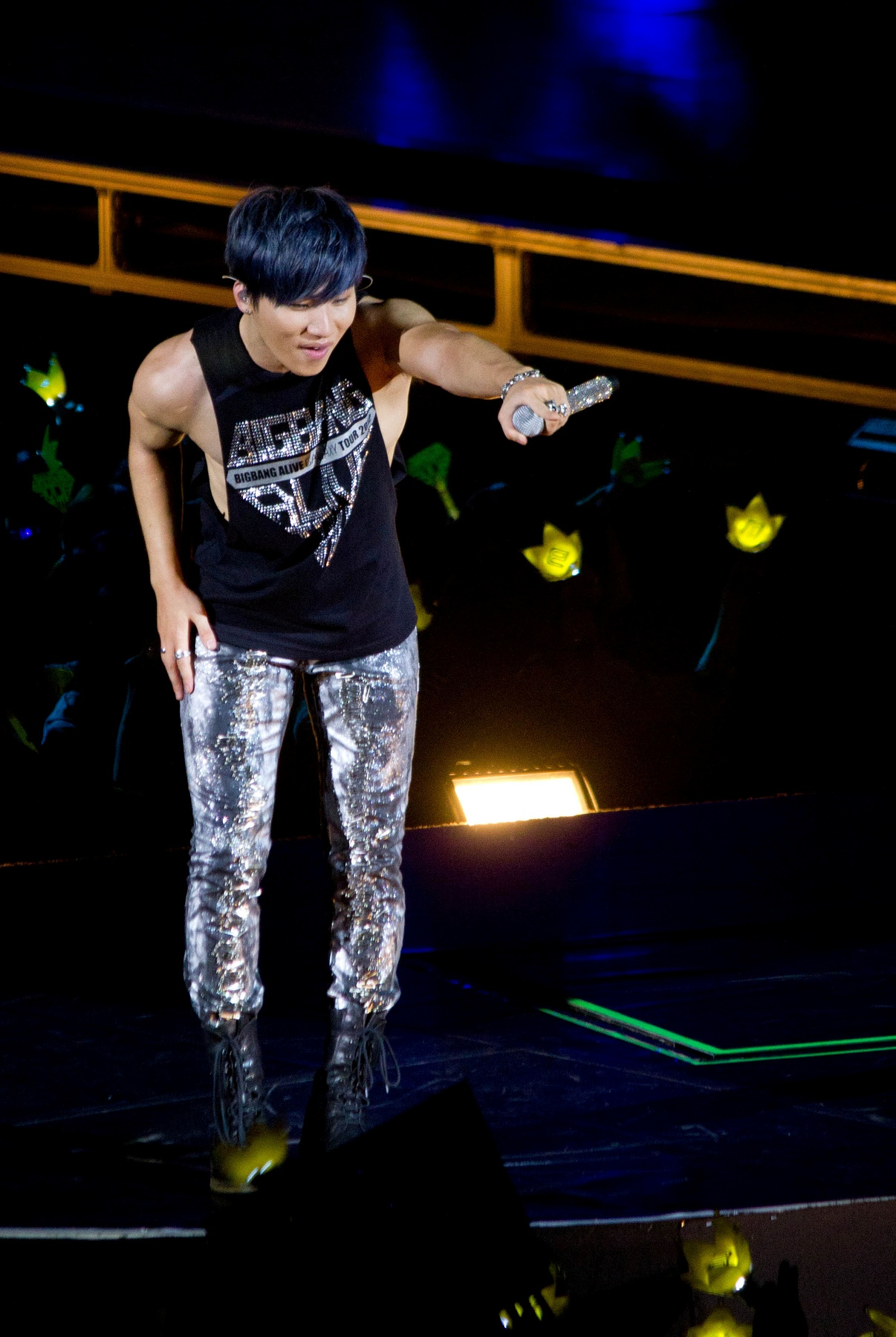
Daesung performing in Big Bang's Alive World Tour in September 2012

Daesung released a new single, "Cotton Candy" (솜사탕), at the end of January 2010. It was composed by Jung Ji-chen, with Daesung penning the lyrics.

In 2010, Daesung began his shoot for MBC's pre-produced musical drama What's Up, written by Song Ji-na. It started airing on MBN channel on December 3, 2011. "Lunatic", a track sung by Daesung for the drama's OST, was also released online on the same day. Since November 2010, Daesung also became a host for the variety-talk show Night After Night. That same year, Daesung recorded a duet with Family Outing co-star Lee Hyori titled "How Did We Get", featured on the latter's album.

In 2011, Daesung released a solo song, "Baby Don't Cry", which was included in BigBang's 4th extended play (EP). The song was first performed in Big Show 2011 concert in February. On May 31, 2011, Daesung was involved in a car accident in which a motorcyclist died. An investigation cleared the singer of charges, but he had to suspend his public activities with Big Bang for a period of time.

Daesung had his first public appearance after the incident on November 6, 2011 when he attended the MTV Europe Music Awards in Belfast, Northern Ireland. From December 2011 to January 2012, he also performed for YG Family concerts which took place in South Korea and Japan. Daesung made a comeback with the rest of the BigBang members in March 2012 with their new mini-album Alive, which includes a solo track sung by Daesung titled "Wings", an "uplifting rock ballad" that received positive reviews.

=== 2013–2016: Solo debut in Japan, D'slove, Delight and encore concerts ===
Daesung released his first solo Japanese album, D'scover on February 27, 2013. It has a total of 12 tracks with mostly remakes of Japanese originals and also includes Daesung's solo tracks, "Wings" and "Baby Don't Cry". D'scover ranked No. 2 on the Oricon Albums Chart and also ranked No. 2 on Oricon Weekly Album Chart. It was then announced that Daesung would hold a total of four solo concerts at Kobe and Tokyo to promote the album. However, due to popular demand, an additional 21 concerts over 17 cities were added, bringing the total to 25 concerts over 18 cities. The D'scover Tour kicked off on March 23 at Kobe's World Memorial Hall and ended on June 18 at Kanagawa's Yokohama Arena, with an attendance of 100,000 fans.

In February 2014, YGEX announced that Daesung would hold a second tour in Japan. The D'slove 2014 in Japan tour kick-started on June 11, 2014 at the Yokohama Arena. On the same day, he released a mini digital album Rainy Rainy containing 4 songs to celebrate the start of his tour. The album topped Japan's iTunes charts.

Daesung released his second Japanese album, D'slove on July 16. The album ranked No. 1 on Oricon's Daily Album Chart on the day of release with a total of 30,090 copies sold. The track "I Love You", featuring Taro Hakase, was released as a physical single and peaked at number five in Oricon's Weekly Album Chart. To support his album, Daesung continued with his second Japanese tour, visiting nine cities and drew a total of 170,000 fans from 17 shows. Daesung become the first K-pop artist to bring in more than 100,000 fans to his concert tour for two consecutive years.

On October 19, Daesung released his third Japanese EP, Delight (Japanese:『でぃらいと』). The album included 9 versions of 4 songs; containing remakes of his Korean trot singles and cover songs of famous Japanese songs from the 70s. He received good comments from the 2 original singers. Delight topped the Oricon Daily Albums Chart on the day of its release with 65,048 copies sold. The album eventually ranked No. 64 on the Oricon Yearly Album Chart with 79,000 copies sold, the highest ranking achieved by the singer so far.

To thank fans for their support, YGEX announced that Daesung would hold a solo encore concert tour in Japan. The concerts were held at Yoyogi National Stadium on January 31 and February 1, 2015 and then at Osaka-jō Hall on February 10 and 11. On the 2nd show at Yoyogi, Linda Yamamoto, who is the original singer of the song "Donimo Tomaranai", made a surprise appearance.

=== 2017–present: Solo Dome tour and D-Day ===
On December 2, 2016, YGEX announced that Daesung would be holding his first solo dome tour in Japan, titled the D-lite Japan Dome Tour 2017. The tour started at the Seibu Prince Dome on April 15 and 16 and was completed at the Kyocera Dome on April 22 and 23. The tour attracted 150,000 fans to the two cities. Later, YGEX announced that Daesung will embark on a nationwide hall tour named DNA Show Vol.1, with 28 shows to start on August 11, 2017. As more than 350,000 people applied to buy tickets to his concerts, which was six times bigger than expected, eleven additional shows were announced, totalling 39 concerts in 18 cities, making it his biggest tour in the country. A total of 88,000 fans are expected to have attended.

His second Japanese EP, named D-Day, was released simultaneously in South Korea and Japan on April 12, 2017. The album contained seven songs written and composed by top Japanese artists, including Ayaka, Hata Motohiro, Kameda Seiji and Daesung himself. D-Day peaked at number one in the Oricon Albums Chart and on the Billboard Japan Albums chart. Daesung was featured on an official cover album of the Japanese band Dreams Come True, covering the song "Egao no Yukue" (笑顔の行方; "The Direction of My Smiling Face") which was originally released in 1990. He also released the digital EP Delight 2 on October 12, 2017, containing three covers and one original song. Upon release, the EP topped several Japanese online music services. Due to its popularity, it was announced that Delight 2 would be released in a physical format on December 20 with seven additional tracks. Upon its physical release, the EP debuted at number three on Oricon, with 45,267 copies sold.

On July 25, 2019, was reported that a building in Gangnam, that Daesung purchased in 2017 before his military enlistment, has been operating an illegal entertainment business. The next day, Daesung released an apology statement and claimed that he was not aware of it because he started his military service right after purchasing the building and that would take legal action against tenants who committed illegal acts, such as the landlord of the building. As of January, all possible charges against him were dropped due to a lack of evidence and legitimate knowledge in the case.

Daesung opened an anonymous YouTube channel in 2020, but was discovered in March 2021. The YouTube channel is called "D'splay".

On December 26, 2022, it was confirmed by YG that Daesung had terminated his contract and was looking for a new start. However, he would still remain a member of BigBang and be open to collaborating anytime. In April 2023, Daesung signed a contract with the RND Company.

In July 2023, Daesung performed at the Waterbomb Japan festival in Nagoya (22 July) and in Tokyo (29 July). In August 2023, he held his first tour in six years, DShow Vol. 2, performing in Fukuoka, Tokyo, Osaka and Nagoya. In March 2024, Daesung released a single song called "Falling Slowly" and began his fan meeting tour in Asia called D's ROAD. As well as a Japan tour called D's IS ME.

Daesung released his first Korean extended play, D's Wave, on April 8, 2025. On December 10, he released the trot-inspired single "Hando-Chogua".

== Personal life ==
Daesung enrolled at Kyung Hee University to study post-modern music in 2008. He is a devout Christian and he has said that his faith was a big influence in re-evaluating his life after he ran a red light in 2011.

=== Military service ===
Daesung began his two-year mandatory military service by entering the 27th Infantry Division's boot camp in Hwacheon, Gangwon Province as an active duty soldier on March 13, 2018. He was discharged along with fellow Big Bang member, Taeyang on November 10, 2019.

== Discography ==
- D'scover (2013)
- D'slove (2014)

== Filmography ==
=== Film ===
Year	Title	Role	Note(s)
2010	A Turtle's Tale: Sammy's Adventures	Sammy	Korean dubbing, with Sulli
2016	Big Bang Made	Himself	Documentary film

=== Television series ===
Year	Title	Role	Note(s)
2011	What's Up	Ha Do-sung	

=== Variety shows ===
Year	Title	Role	Note(s)
2008–2009	Show! Music Core	Co-host	With Seungri
2008–2010	Family Outing Season 1	Main cast	With Yoo Jae-suk, Lee Hyo-ri, Kim Jong-kook, Lee Chun-hee, Park Ye-jin, Yoon Jong-shin, Kim Su-ro etc.
2010–2011	Night After Night	Co-host	With Jung Yong-hwa, Uee etc.
2013	D'splay	Co-host	With VJ Boo
2013	D'splay Returns	Co-host	With VJ Boo
2018	YG Future Strategy Office	Cast member	Cameo
2023	Active King	Producer	
2023	Trotgirl in Japan	Patriarch invited	Burning Trotman Japanese version
2024	Starlight Boys	Guider	With Lee Seung-gi, Choi Young-joon, Hanhae, Kwon Eun-bi, Hui, Eric, Yoon
2024-Present	집대성 Zip Daesung	Host	

=== Musical ===
Year	Title	Role
2008	Cats (Korean version)	Rum Tum Tugger

== Tours ==
- D'scover Tour 2013 in Japan (2013)
- D'slove Tour (2014–2015)
- D-lite Japan Dome Tour 2017 (2017)
- DNA Show Vol.1 (2017)
- DNA Show Vol.2 (2023)
- D's is Me (2024)
- D's Road (2024)
- D's Wave Asia Tour (2025)

== Awards and nominations ==
Year	Award-giving body	Category	Work	Result	Ref.
2013	The 3rd Music Jacket Award	Best Music Jacket	D'scover	Nominated	
2025	Korea First Brand Awards	Male Celebrity YouTuber	Daesung	Won	
2025	Brand Customer Loyalty Awards	Male Celebrity YouTuber	Daesung	Won	
