= Big Bang 2 (album) =

Studio album by BigBang
- Released: May 11, 2011
- Recorded: 2009–2011
- Studio: YG (Seoul)
- Genres: R&B; hip hop; dance-pop; electropop
- Length: 35:32
- Language: Japanese
- Labels: YG; UMJ
- Producers: Yang Hyun-suk (exec.); Masahiro Kasumoto (exec.)

BigBang chronology
Tonight (2011)	Big Bang 2 (2011)	Alive (2012)

Singles from Big Bang 2
- 1. "Koe o Kikasete" Released: November 4, 2009; 2. "Tell Me Goodbye" Released: June 9, 2010; 3. "Beautiful Hangover" Released: August 25, 2010; 4. "Tonight (Japanese version)" Released: April 27, 2011; 5. "Ms. Liar" Released: May 11, 2011

Big Bang 2 is the third Japanese studio album by South Korean boy band BigBang. It was released on May 11, 2011.

The album was preceded by three singles: "Koe o Kikasete", "Tell Me Goodbye", and "Beautiful Hangover". "Koe o Kikasete" and "Tell Me Goodbye" managed to chart within the top five in the Japanese Oricon charts, and "Beautiful Hangover" managed to chart in the top ten.

== Background and development ==
Big Bang 2 is BigBang's second original Japanese album, following the release of Big Bang in 2009. The song "Ms. Liar" is a Japanese remake of their Korean song "Stupid Liar".

== Singles ==
Prior to Big Bang 2's announcement, three singles were released. "Koe o Kikasete" was the first single and was released November 4, 2009. It charted for sixteen weeks and managed a peak position at number four. Following "Koe o Kikasete" was "Tell Me Goodbye", released June 9, 2010. "Tell Me Goodbye" achieved much the same success, managing to chart for fifteen weeks peaking at number five. "Beautiful Hangover", the third single reached number seven and charted for eight weeks. On April 18, 2011, a Japanese music video version of "Tonight" was made and uploaded on YG Entertainment's YouTube account and was released as a digital download on April 27, 2011. A fifth single, "Ms. Liar", was digitally released the same day as the album release.

== Promotion ==
Big Bang 2 is to be accompanied by the Love & Hope Tour across Japan. The tour was previously titled the Love & Pain Tour, but it was changed due to the 2011 Tōhoku earthquake and tsunami. Part of the proceeds went to disaster relief.

== Track listing ==
Big Bang 2 – Standard edition
No.	Title	Lyrics	Music	Arrangement	Length
1.	"Intro (Thank You & You)"	G-Dragon	G-Dragon, Choice37	Choice37	1:36
2.	"Tonight" (トゥナイト; Tunaito; Japanese Version)	G-Dragon, T.O.P	G-Dragon, e.knock	Choi Pil-kang	3:41
3.	"Somebody to Love"	G-Dragon, T.O.P	G-Dragon, Ham Seung-cheon, Kang Wook-jin	Ham Seung-cheon, Kang Wook-jin	3:31
4.	"Beautiful Hangover"	G-Dragon, Shikata, iNoZzi, Perry	Nadir Benkahla, Saeed Molavi, Perry		3:46
5.	"Ola Yeah!" ("オラ Yeah!")	Shoko Fujibayashi	Jimmy Thornfeldt, Mohombi Moupondo	Jimmy Thornfeldt, Mohombi Moupondo	3:05
6.	"Tell Me Goodbye"	Shoko Fujibayashi, Perry	Jimmy Thornfeldt, Mohombi Moupondo	Jimmy Thornfeldt, Mohombi Moupondo	4:07
7.	"Let Me Hear Your Voice" (声をきかせて; Koe O Kikasete)	Yamamoto Narumi, Robin, G-Dragon, T.O.P	Teddy	Teddy	4:16
8.	"Ms. Liar" (Japanese Version of "Stupid Liar")	G-Dragon, T.O.P	G-Dragon, Choi Pil-kang	Choi Pil-kang, Dee.P	3:53
9.	"Hands Up"	G-Dragon, T.O.P	G-Dragon, E.Knock (KUSH)	E.Knock (KUSH)	3:55
10.	"Love Song"	G-Dragon, Teddy, T.O.P	Teddy, G-Dragon	Seo Won-jin	3:44
Total length:					35:32

CD+DVD Edition – DVD bonus tracks
No.	Title	Length
1.	"Let Me Hear Your Voice (声をきかせて; Koe O Kikasete)" (Music Video)
2.	"Tell Me Goodbye" (Music Video)
3.	"Beautiful Hangover" (Music Video)
4.	"Tonight (Japanese Version)" (Music Video)

== Charts ==
=== Weekly charts ===
Chart performance for Big Bang 2
Chart (2011)	Peak position
Japanese Albums (Oricon)	1

=== Year-end charts ===
Year-end charts for Big Bang 2
Chart (2011)	Position
Japanese Albums (Oricon)	63

== Sales and certifications ==
Region	Certification	Certified units/sales
Japan (RIAJ)	Gold	98,854

== Release history ==
Release history and formats for Big Bang 2
Region	Date	Format	Label
Japan	May 11, 2011	CD; CD+DVD; digital download	YG; Universal Music Japan
Taiwan	May 20, 2011	CD	Universal Music Taiwan
