= Tell Me Goodbye =

Single by BigBang

from the album Big Bang 2
- B-side: "Hands Up"
- Released: June 9, 2010
- Genre: J-Pop; R&B
- Length: 4:05
- Label: YG; Universal Music Japan
- Composers: Jimmy Thornfeldt, Mohombi Moupond
- Lyricists: Shoko Fujibayashi; Perry
- Producers: Jimmy Thörnfeldt; Mohombi Moupondo

BigBang singles chronology
"Lollipop Pt. 2" (2009)	"Tell Me Goodbye" (2010)	"Beautiful Hangover" (2010)

"Tell Me Goodbye" is a song released by the South Korean boy band BigBang. It's the group's fourth Japanese single and second single from the album Big Bang 2 (2011). It was released on June 9, 2010. "Tell Me Goodbye" is song in Japanese, with the exception of a few English lines. A Korean version of the song, "Hands Up", was added on the group's fourth Korean extended play Tonight (2011).

== Track listing ==
Tell Me Goodbye – CD single edition
No.	Title	Length
1.	"Tell Me Goodbye"	4:05
2.	"Hands Up"	3:56
3.	"Tell Me Goodbye" (remix)	4:51
Total length:		12:52

CD+DVD Edition – DVD bonus tracks
No.	Title	Length
1.	"Tell Me Goodbye" (Music video)
2.	"Tell Me Goodbye" (Music video - Making of)

== Charts ==
Weekly chart performance for "Tell Me Goodbye"
Chart (2010)	Peak position
Japan (Oricon)	5
South Korea (Gaon)	34

== Certifications ==
Certifications for "Tell Me Goodbye"
Region	Certification	Certified units/sales
Japan (RIAJ)	Gold	100,000^{*}
^{*} Sales figures based on certification alone.

== Release history ==
Region	Date	Format	Label
Japan	June 9, 2010	CD single; CD single + DVD; digital download	YG; Universal Music Japan
South Korea	June 9, 2010	CD single	YG
Taiwan	June 18, 2010	CD single	Warner Music Taiwan
