= D-Day (D-Lite EP) =

- CD+Sumapura and Digital version cover

EP by D-Lite
- Released: March 28, 2017
- Recorded: 2017
- Studios: Prime Sound Studio Form (Tokyo); Sony (Tokyo); Victor (Tokyo); YG (Seoul)
- Genres: Folk; alternative rock
- Length: 26:19
- Language: Japanese
- Label: YGEX
- Producers: Kameda Seiji; D-Lite

D-Lite chronology
| Delight (2014) | D-Day (2017) | Delight 2 (2017) |

Singles from D-Day
- 1. "D-Day" Released: March 28, 2017

D-Day is the second Japanese extended play of South Korean artist, Daesung, also known by his Japanese stage name, D-Lite, member of boy band Big Bang. The album was released digitally on March 28 and physically on April 12, 2017.

== Background and composition ==
In December 2016, Daesung's first Dome Tour was announced, with shows in the Japanese cities of Saitama and Osaka. In support of this tour, a new album's name and release date was announced in February of the following year. D-Day contains seven songs written and composed by top Japanese artists, including Ayaka, Hata Motohiro and Mizuno Yoshiki. Kameda Seiji, who previously produced his Japanese covers album, D'scover, will be the album's main producer. Daesung wrote some songs himself as well, including "Spring Breeze Melody."

Compared to his previous album, Daesung stated that D-Day is more upbeat and energetic, and that he recorded with "the spirit of a 20-year-old." The track "Venus" is a funk song with a "groovy rhythm" reminiscent of his previous song "Joyful". In contrast, "Anymore" is a "heartrending ballad with emotional vocals" and rock elements.

== Promotion ==
To promote the album, Daesung gave an interview to the radio station Tokyo FM and appeared in several Japanese TV shows, including Sakigake, AbemaTV, and Music On! TV. He also covered the magazine An an and landed editorials on Numéro Tokyo, ViVi and TV Life.

On March 13, a teaser of the title track's music video was posted on Big Bang's official YouTube channel. Jiji Press released an exclusive behind the scenes video of "D-Day" the following day. YGEX then posted daily previews of the other tracks on their website.

D-Day was Daesung's first album to be released for digital download in South Korea.

== Commercial performance ==
After its digital release, D-Day debuted at number-two on Oricon's Digital Weekly Album Chart with 3,462 copies sold. A week later, the physical edition debuted at number one on Oricon's Daily Album Chart with 29,038 copies sold. D-Day debuted at number one at the Oricon Albums Chart weekly, with over 38,000 copies sold, making Daesung the second foreign male solo artist to have two consecutive number one albums in Japan after Michael Jackson. Additionally, it was the best selling album by a Korean soloist in the first half of 2017 in Japan.

== Track listing ==
CD
| No. | Title | Lyrics | Music | Arrangement | Length |
|---|---|---|---|---|---|
| 1. | "Intro (To You)" (君へ) | Sung Hwak Cho, Kenn Kato | Sung Hwak Cho, Cokejazz | Kameda Seiji | 2:23 |
| 2. | "D-Day" | Hata Motohiro | Hata Motohiro | Kameda Seiji | 3:52 |
| 3. | "Venus" | Mizuno Yoshiki | Mizuno Yoshiki | Kameda Seiji | 4:00 |
| 4. | "The Sign" | Ayaka | Ayaka | Kameda Seiji | 3:56 |
| 5. | "Spring Breeze Melody" (ハルカゼメロディ) | D-Lite, Kameda Seiji, Kota76 | D-Lite | Kameda Seiji | 4:18 |
| 6. | "Close Future" (近未来) | Kameda Seiji | D-lite, Kameda Seiji | Kameda Seiji | 3:51 |
| 7. | "Anymore" | Sung Hwak Cho, Yeon Jae Min | Sung Hwak Cho, Cokejazz | Kameda Seiji | 3:55 |

DVD
| No. | Title | Length |
|---|---|---|
| 1. | "D-Day" (Music Video) |
| 2. | "Wings" (Music Video) |
| 3. | "Utautai no Ballad (歌うたいのバラッド)" (Music Video) |
| 4. | "I Love You" (Music Video) |
| 5. | "Rainy Rainy" (Music Video) |
| 6. | "Shut Up" (Music Video) |
| 7. | "Look at me, Gwisun (ナルバキスン)" (Music Video) |
| 8. | "D-Day" (Behind the Scenes) |
| 9. | "DLive GOODS" (Interlude Movie) |
| 10. | "DLive 2014 GOODS" (Interlude Movie) |
| 11. | "Encore!! 3D Tour" (Interlude Movie) |
| 12. | "Wings + Look at Me, Gwisun" (Performance form Big Bang's 0.TO.10 concert in Osaka) |
| 13. | "Joyfull (with Seungri)" (Performance form Big Bang's 0.TO.10 concert in Osaka) |
| 14. | "Utautai no Ballad (歌うたいのバラッド)" (Performance form D'scover Tour) |
| 15. | "Rainy Rainy" (Performance form D'slove Tour) |
| 16. | "Dress" (Performance form Encore!! 3D Tour) |

== Charts ==
| Chart (2017) | Peak position |
|---|---|
| Oricon Daily Albums | 1 |
| Oricon Weekly Albums | 1 |
| Japan Hot Albums (Billboard) | 1 |
| Japan Top Albums Sales (Billboard) | 1 |

== Sales ==
| Country | Sales |
|---|---|
| Japan | 53,873 |

== Release history ==
| Region | Date | Label | Format |
|---|---|---|---|
| South Korea and Japan | March 28, 2017 | YGEX | Digital download |
| Japan | April 12, 2017 | YGEX | CD, CD+DVD, Playbutton |
