= DNA Show Vol.1 =

2017–18 concert tour by Daesung

DなSHOW Vol.1
- Tour by Daesung
- Location: Japan
- Start date: August 11, 2017
- End date: January 7, 2018
- No. of shows: 41 shows

Daesung concert chronology
- D-lite Japan Dome Tour (2017); DなSHOW Vol.1 (2017)

DNA Show Vol.1 (stylized as DなSHOW Vol.1) is the fourth Japanese tour by Daesung.

== History ==
On June 26, 2017, YGEX announced that Daesung will embark on a nationwide solo hall tour, with 28 shows to start on August. More than 350,000 people tried to buy tickets to his concerts, which is six times bigger than the expected number, resulting an eleven additional shows, rising the number to 39 concerts in 18 cities, and a total of 88,000 people will be attending his concerts.

On August 11, YGEX announced two final shows to be held in Hawaii at Hawaii Theatre.

== Tour dates ==
Date	City	Country	Venue	Attendance
August 11, 2017	Urayasu	Japan	Maihama Amphitheater	88,000
August 12, 2017	Urayasu	Japan	Maihama Amphitheater	88,000
August 16, 2017	Fukuoka	Japan	Fukuoka Sunpalace	88,000
August 17, 2017 (two shows)	Fukuoka	Japan	Fukuoka Sunpalace	88,000
August 25, 2017 (two shows)	Osaka	Japan	Orix Theater	88,000
August 30, 2017	Sendai	Japan	Sendai Sun Plaza	88,000
September 6, 2017	Nagoya	Japan	Aichi Prefectural Art Theater	88,000
September 7, 2017 (two shows)	Nagoya	Japan	Aichi Prefectural Art Theater	88,000
September 9, 2017 (two shows)	Saitama	Japan	Saitamashi Bunka Center	88,000
September 17, 2017	Hokkaido	Japan	Nitori Culture Hall	88,000
September 18, 2017	Hokkaido	Japan	Nitori Culture Hall	88,000
September 22, 2017	Hiroshima	Japan	Hiroshimabunkagakuen HBG Hall	88,000
September 23, 2017	Ōita	Japan	Iichiko synthesis Cultural Center Guranshiata	88,000
September 25, 2017	Kagoshima	Japan	Kagoshima Cultural Hall	88,000
September 27, 2017	Nagasaki	Japan	Nagasaki Brick Hall	88,000
September 30, 2017 (two shows)	Ōtsu	Japan	Shiga Prefectural Art Theater Biwako Hall Great Hall	88,000
October 1, 2017	Kurashiki	Japan	Kurashiki Community Hall	88,000
October 3, 2017	Kobe	Japan	Kobe International House	88,000
October 6, 2017 (two shows)	Osaka	Japan	Orix Theater	88,000
October 8, 2017 (two shows)	Osaka	Japan	Orix Theater	88,000
October 9, 2017	Osaka	Japan	Orix Theater	88,000
October 13, 2017	Urayasu	Japan	Maihama Amphitheater	88,000
October 14, 2017 (two shows)	Urayasu	Japan	Maihama Amphitheater	88,000
October 17, 2017	Niigata	Japan	Niigata Prefectural Civic Center	88,000
October 19, 2017	Kanazawa	Japan	Hokuriku Electric Power Center Honorable Mori Hall	88,000
October 22, 2017	Osaka	Japan	Orix Theater	88,000
October 25, 2017 (two shows)	Tokyo	Japan	Nakano Sun Plaza	88,000
October 27, 2017	Yokohama	Japan	Pacifico Yokohama	88,000
October 31, 2017 (two shows)	Kobe	Japan	Kobe International House	88,000
January 6, 2018	Honolulu	United States	Hawaii Theatre	2,700
January 7, 2018	Honolulu	United States	Hawaii Theatre	2,700
Total				90,700
