= Big Bang 03 =

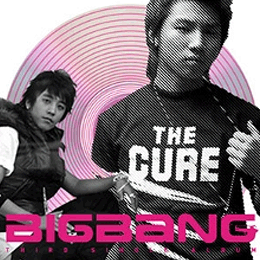

Single album by BigBang
- Released: November 21, 2006
- Recorded: 2006
- Genre: K-pop; hip hop; R&B
- Length: 12:56
- Language: Korean
- Label: YG
- Producer: G-Dragon; Brave Brothers; Lee Gyu-won

BigBang chronology
Big Bang Is V.I.P (2006)	Big Bang 03 (2006)	Big Bang Vol.1 (2006)

Singles from Big Bang 03
- 1. "Forever with U" Released: November 21, 2006

Big Bang 03 (also known as Big Bang Third Single) is the third single album by the South Korean boy band BigBang, released under YG Entertainment on November 21, 2006, via CD and digital download. It spawned the single "Forever with You", featuring Park Bom who was also featured on their debut single track "We Belong Together" released in August. Big Bang 03 was released two months after their second single album Big Bang Is V.I.P. Like its two predecessors, it was able to chart for a long time before it dropped from the monthly album charts in South Korea.

== Track listing ==
Big Bang 03 track listing
No.	Title	Lyrics	Music	Length
1.	"Victory (Intro)"	G-Dragon	G-Dragon; Brave Brothers	1:52
2.	"Big Bang"	G-Dragon	Perry	3:26
3.	"Forever with U" (featuring Park Bom)	G-Dragon; T.O.P	Brave Brothers	3:39
4.	"Good Bye Baby"	Taeyang; G-Dragon; T.O.P	Perry; Brave Brothers	3:32
5.	"Try Smiling" (웃어본다; Useo Bonda) (Daesung solo)	An Young-min	Lee Gyu-won	4:13
Total length:				16:40

== Charts ==
=== Monthly charts ===
Chart (2006)	Peak position
South Korean Albums (MIAK)	7

=== Yearly charts ===
Chart (2006)	Position
South Korean Albums (RIAK)	52

== Sales ==
Region	Sales
South Korea (MIAK)	30,000

== Release history ==
Big Bang 03 release history
Region	Date	Format	Label
South Korea	November 21, 2006	CD; digital download	YG Entertainment
