= Delight (D-Lite EP) =

- CD only cover

EP by D-Lite
- Released: October 29, 2014
- Recorded: 2014
- Genres: Folk; enka; alternative rock
- Length: 27:09
- Language: Japanese
- Label: YGEX
- Producers: G-Dragon; Kōji Makaino; Sasaji Masanori; Kush; Shunichi Tokura

D-Lite chronology
D'slove (2014)	Delight (2014)	D-Day (2017)

Singles from D'scover
- 1. "Look at me, Gwisun" Released: October 8, 2014

Delight is the first Japanese extended play of South Korean artist, Daesung, also known by his Japanese stage name, D-Lite, member and lead vocalist of boy band Big Bang. The album includes 9 versions of 4 songs, including 3 new enka songs, all of which recorded in Japanese. The album was released through 'Enka! Avex Produced by YGEX.'

== Background and release ==
On September 18, 2014, YG Entertainment announced that Daesung will be releasing a concept album D-Lite on October 29 in celebration of year-end party season. The album will contain a total of nine tracks, including three new enka songs, the lead track will be "Look at me, GwiSoon", originally written by G-Dragon, but the Japanese lyrics will be written by Kenichi Maeyamada. The album contains songs under trot genre. The album will have CD, and a DVD include the music video for "Look at me, GwiSoon" and "Shut Up" as well as the summer episode of How to Enjoy Vacation in Hokkaido.

On the first day of release the album sold 65,048 copies in Japan, topping Oricon daily chart. The album sold total 71,000 in the first week of its release, topping Oricon Weekly Chart, and become the highest first week sale for Daesung.

== Track listing ==
CD
No.	Title	Lyrics	Music	Length
1.	"Look at Me, Gwisun" (Japanese version)	G-Dragon, Kenichi Maeyamada	G-Dragon, Kush	2:48
2.	"Big Hit" (Japanese version; テバギヤ)	G-Dragon, Kenichi Maeyamada	G-Dragon	3:11
3.	"Old Diary" (古い日記)	Yasui Kazumi	Kōji Makaino	2:48
4.	"Just Can't Stop It" (どうにもとまらない)	Yū Aku	Shunichi Tokura	3:03
5.	"Look at Me, Gwisun" (Remix)	G-Dragon, Kenichi Maeyamada	G-Dragon, Kush	3:24
6.	"Look at Me, Gwisun" (Karaoke version)	G-Dragon, Kenichi Maeyamada	G-Dragon, Kush	2:47
7.	"Big Hit" (Karaoke version)	Yasui Kazumi	G-Dragon	3:11
8.	"Old Diary" (Karaoke version)	MISIA	Kōji Makaino	2:47
9.	"Just Can't Stop It" (Karaoke version)	Yū Aku	Shunichi Tokura	3:05
Total length:				27:09

DVD
No.	Title	Length
1.	"Look at Me, Gwisun" (music video)
2.	"Making of Look at Me, Gwisun"
3.	"Shut Up" (music video)
4.	"Making of Shut Up"
5.	"To-san's How to Enjoy Summer in Hokkaido"

== Charts ==
Chart	Peak position
Japanese Daily Albums (Oricon)	1
Japanese Weekly Albums (Oricon)	1
Japanese Yeally 2014 Albums (Oricon)	64

== Sales ==
Country	Sales
Japan	79,000

== Release history ==
Region	Date	Label	Format
Japan	October 29, 2014	YGEX	CD, DVD, Digital download
