= D'slove =

- CD+DVD and Digital version cover

Studio album by D-Lite
- Released: July 16, 2014
- Studio: YG (Seoul)
- Genre: J-pop; alternative rock
- Length: 40:13
- Language: Japanese
- Label: YGEX
- Producer: D-Lite

D-Lite chronology
D'scover (2013)	D'slove (2014)	Delight - EP (2014)

Singles from D'slove
- 1. "I Love You" Released: July 10, 2013; 2. "Look At Me, Gwisun" Released: October 8, 2014; 3. "Shut Up" Released: October 17, 2014

D'slove is the second Japanese studio album by D-Lite (Daesung), member of the South Korean group Big Bang.

== D'slove 2014 tour in Japan ==
To support his album, D-Lite started his second Japanese tour, visiting 9 cities and drew a total of 170,000 fans from 17 shows, D-Lite become the first K-Pop artist to bring in more than 100,000 fans to his concert tour for two consecutive years.

== Track listing ==
No.	Title	Lyrics	Music	Arrangement	Length
1.	"Rainy Rainy"	D-LITE, Amon Hayashi	Mitsu.J	Mitsu.J for Digz, Inc. Group	4:59
2.	"Feelings Deepened" (想い募って)	D-LITE, Sung Hwak Cho, Shoko Fujibayashi	DEE.P, Sung Hwak Cho	DEE.P	4:49
3.	"SHUT UP"	G-Dragon, Kenn Kato	Seung Cheon Ham, Uk Jin Kang, BIGTONE	Seung Cheon Ham, Uk Jin Kang	3:30
4.	"Two People? Alone!!" (二人?一人!!)	D-LITE, Kenn Kato	AiRPLAY, BIGTONE	AiRPLAY	3:51
5.	"Dress"	D-LITE, Amon Hayashi	Mitsu.J	Mitsu.J for Digz, Inc. Group	5:08
6.	"Try Smiling" (ウソボンダ)	Narumi Yamamoto	Gyu Won Lee	Gyu Won Lee	4:16
7.	"Awake, Asleep" (醒めて、眠れ)	D-LITE, Kenn Kato	Seung Cheon Ham, Uk Jin Kang, AiRPLAY, Sung Hwak Cho	Seung Cheon Ham, Uk Jin Kang, AiRPLAY	3:31
8.	"Even When the World Ends" (世界が終わっても)	D-LITE, RJ Project	Q, BIGTONE	Q	3:53
9.	"Look at me, Gwisun" (ナルバキスン)	G-Dragon, Kenichi Maeyamada	G-Dragon, KUSH	Jung Mook Kim	2:50
10.	"I Love You" (feat. 葉加瀬太郎)	Yutaka Ozaki	Yutaka Ozaki	Seiji Kameda	4:23
Total length:					40:13

== Charts ==
=== Oricon Charts (Japan) ===
Oricon Singles Chart	Peak position	Sales
Weekly Chart	2	37,517
Monthly Chart (July)	13	44,391
Total	Year End	45,000

== Release history ==
Region	Date	Label	Format	Edition
Japan	16 July 2014	YGEX	CD, Digital download	CD, CD+DVD, Playbutton
