= Big Bang Vol.1 =

Big Bang Vol. 1
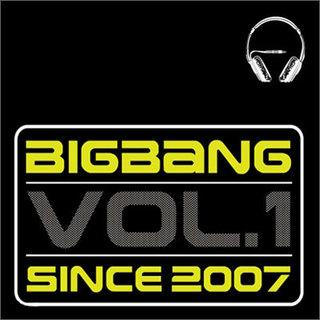

Studio album by BigBang
- Released: December 22, 2006
- Recorded: 2006
- Genre: K-pop; hip hop; R&B
- Length: 36:52
- Label: YG; Yedang Company
- Producer: BigBang; Brave Brothers; Kim Eana; Lee Sung-woo

BigBang chronology
| Big Bang Vol. 1 (2006) | Always (2007) |

Singles from Big Bang Vol.1
- 1. "Big Bang" Released: August 28, 2006; 2. "Big Bang Is V.I.P" Released: September 28, 2006; 3. "Big Bang 03" Released: November 21, 2006; 4. "Dirty Cash" Released: December 22, 2006

Big Bang Vol. 1 – Since 2007 is the debut studio album by South Korean boy band BigBang, released on December 22, 2006 through YG Entertainment. The album debuted at number three on the old monthly album charts in South Korea in December 2006, moving 33,000 units in its first month. It went on to sell over 110,000 copies in total.

Four singles were released to support the album including three single albums: "Big Bang", "Big Bang Is V.I.P", "Big Bang 03", and "Dirty Cash". Members of the group participated in penning lyrics to their songs.

== Background ==
BigBang was the first idol group formed by YG Entertainment, whose previous roster included hip hop groups Jinusean and 1TYM. The quintet held their official debut on August 19, 2006 at the Gymnastics Arena in Seoul Olympic Park during the YG Family 10th Year Concert, which was broadcast the following month. Their first single "Big Bang", released shortly thereafter, contained the songs "We Belong Together", featuring label mate Park Bom; "A Fool's Only Tears" (눈물뿐인 바보; Nunmulppunin Babo); and "This Love", a remix of the American pop rock band Maroon 5 song, rewritten and performed by G-Dragon.

== Commercial performance ==
The first single released for the album went on to sell nearly 40,000 copies. The second single, "Big Bang Is V.I.P", was released in September, eventually topping 32,000 copies sold. Their last single, "Big Bang 03", followed, with final sales nearing 40,000 copies. The group held their first concert, The Real, that December, followed by their debut album, BigBang Vol. 1 – Since 2007; it sold over 48,000 copies by the end of February 2007 and eventually over 110,000 copies total.

== Track listing ==
| No. | Title | Lyrics | Music | Arrangement | Length |
|---|---|---|---|---|---|
| 1. | "Intro (Big Bang)" | G-Dragon | Perry | Perry | 0:26 |
| 2. | "She Can't Get Enough" | Kim Eana, G-Dragon | Carlos Adaamick Mendoza, Robbi Nevil, Bradley Spalter, Michael Norfleet, Jean Rodríguez, Wesly Rodriguez, Phillip White | Carlos Adaamick Mendoza, Robbi Nevil, Bradley Spalter, Michael Norfleet, Jean Rodríguez, Wesly Rodriguez, Phillip White | 3:29 |
| 3. | "Dirty Cash" | 072, G-Dragon | Andy Love, Jos Jorgensen | Andy Love, Jos Jorgensen | 3:14 |
| 4. | "Next Day (Seungri solo)" (다음날) | Sim Jae Hee | Derek Bramble | Derek Bramble | 4:03 |
| 5. | "Big Boy (T.O.P solo, featuring Lee Eun-joo)" | T.O.P | T.O.P, Brave Brothers | Brave Brothers | 3:18 |
| 6. | "Shake It (featuring Lee Eun-joo)" (흔들어) | G-Dragon | G-Dragon, Brave Brothers | Brave Brothers | 3:46 |
| 7. | "A Fool of Tears" (눈물뿐인 바보) | G-Dragon, An Young Min | Jeon Seung Woo | Jeon Seung Woo | 4:03 |
| 8. | "My Girl" (Taeyang Solo) | G-Dragon | Israel Dwaine Cruz | Israel Dwaine Cruz | 3:52 |
| 9. | "La La La" | BigBang | Perry | Perry | 3:00 |
| 10. | "This Love" (G-Dragon solo) | G-Dragon | G-Dragon, James Valentine, Adam Levine, Ryan Dusick, Mickey Madden, Jesse Carmichael | G-Dragon | 3:31 |
| 11. | "Try Smiling (Daesung solo)" (웃어본다) | An Young Min | Lee Gyu Won | Lee Gyu Won | 4:12 |
| Total length: | | | | | 36:52 |

== Charts ==
=== Weekly charts ===
| Chart (2010) | Peak position |
|---|---|
| South Korean Albums (Gaon) | 7 |

=== Monthly charts ===
| Chart (December 2006) | Peak position |
|---|---|
| South Korean Albums (RIAK) | 3 |

=== Yearly charts ===
| Chart (2006) | Position |
|---|---|
| South Korean Albums (RIAK) | 39 |

== Sales ==
| Region | Sales |
|---|---|
| South Korea (RIAK) | 110,408 |
