= Beautiful Hangover =

Single by BigBang

from the album Big Bang 2
- Language: Japanese; English
- B-side: "Somebody to Luv"
- Released: August 25, 2010
- Recorded: 2010
- Genre: J-Pop; hip hop; synthpop
- Length: 3:46
- Label: UMJ
- Songwriters: G-Dragon; Shikata; iNozzi; Perry
- Producers: Nadir Benkahla; Saeed Molavi; Perry

BigBang singles chronology
"Tell Me Goodbye" (2010)	"Beautiful Hangover" (2010)	"Tonight" (2011)

Music video
- "Beautiful Hangover" on YouTube

"Beautiful Hangover" is a single by the South Korean hip-hop group BigBang. "Beautiful Hangover" is sung in Japanese and English. It was released on August 25, 2010. The music video has two versions: an advised and revised. This song (and the b-side) was then added to BigBang's second Japanese album, Big Bang 2 (2011).

== Music video ==
The video was filmed in July 2010. The advised version premiered on August 10, 2010, and was played on night-time television only, but was played on headliner. The revised (re-edited) version premiered on August 24, 2010.

The video is dark and muted; the neutral colors and many visible cameras give it a smoky look. The story shows Taeyang, hurt by a relationship with a beautiful but careless girl, being tempted to take drugs from Daesung's character. G-Dragon appears to have already been broken by this same mysterious girl, and is already addicted to the drugs.

During his verse, Seungri is shown seeming to control and observe Daesung and Taeyang from a white room full of computer screens. The screens also show T.O.P sitting in a dark office. Taeyang also dances in a great white room with pulsing grey dots in the air, and another room full of hanging cameras. The "drugs" that Daesung tries to convince Taeyang to take are frequently seen, also with Seungri. Taeyang is seen finally succumbing to Daesung.

A revised version was made, but it did not show clips of Taeyang dancing with the grey dots, but new scenes of him dancing with the cameras was shown instead. It was heavily edited, along with a scene of a hand holding alcohol.

== Track listing ==
"Beautiful Hangover" – Digital edition
No.	Title	Lyrics	Music	Length
1.	"Beautiful Hangover"	G-Dragon, Shikata, iNoZzi, Perry	Nadir Benkahla, Saeed Molavi, Perry	3:46
2.	"Somebody to Love"	Perry Borja, Kitayama Moss, G-Dragon	Ham Seung Cheon, Kang Uk Jin, G-Dragon	3:31
Total length:				7:17

== Charts ==
Oricon Albums Chart	Peak position	Debut sales	Sales total
Daily Singles Chart	5	25,461	36,600+
Weekly Singles Chart	7	25,461	36,600+

== Release history ==
Region	Date	Format	Label
Japan	August 25, 2010	CD single	Universal Music Japan
Taiwan	September 3, 2010	CD single	Universal Music Taiwan
