= Tonight (BigBang song) =

Single by BigBang

from the album Tonight
- Language: Korean
- Released: February 24, 2011
- Studio: YG (Seoul)
- Genre: Dance-pop
- Length: 3:39
- Label: YG
- Songwriters: G-Dragon; T.O.P
- Producers: G-Dragon; e.knock

BigBang singles chronology
"Beautiful Hangover" (2010)	"Tonight" (2011)	"Love Song" (2011)

Music video
- "Tonight" on YouTube

"Tonight" (Korean: 투나잇; Romanization: Tunait) is a song by South Korean boy band BigBang released on February 24, 2011, through YG Entertainment as the only single from the quintet's fourth extended play of the same name after a two-year hiatus. It was also the group's first Korean-language single since "Sunset Glow" in 2008. Written by members G-Dragon and T.O.P, the song peaked at number one on the Gaon Digital Chart, and become one of the best-performing singles of 2011 in their home country.

== Background and composition ==
"Tonight"
A 21-second sample of "Tonight", which is described as a dance-pop and electronic song.

Following a two-year hiatus where members explored and experimented with different sounds, BigBang returned to South Korea with their 2011 Big Show concert, showcasing songs from the then-unreleased EP. Though the group's previous extended plays contained songs that were heavily influenced by electronic music, they opted to concentrate more on "warm rock music" for new materials. Released as the lead single, "Tonight" contained a "sophisticated electronic sound" paired with acoustic guitar. The song is "clearly grounded in dance-pop" a genre the quintet is known for. The track is built over "fist-pumping beats and applause", features "heavily autotuned vocals" and concludes "with sudden silence and then picking up again as if returning for an encore."

== Reception ==
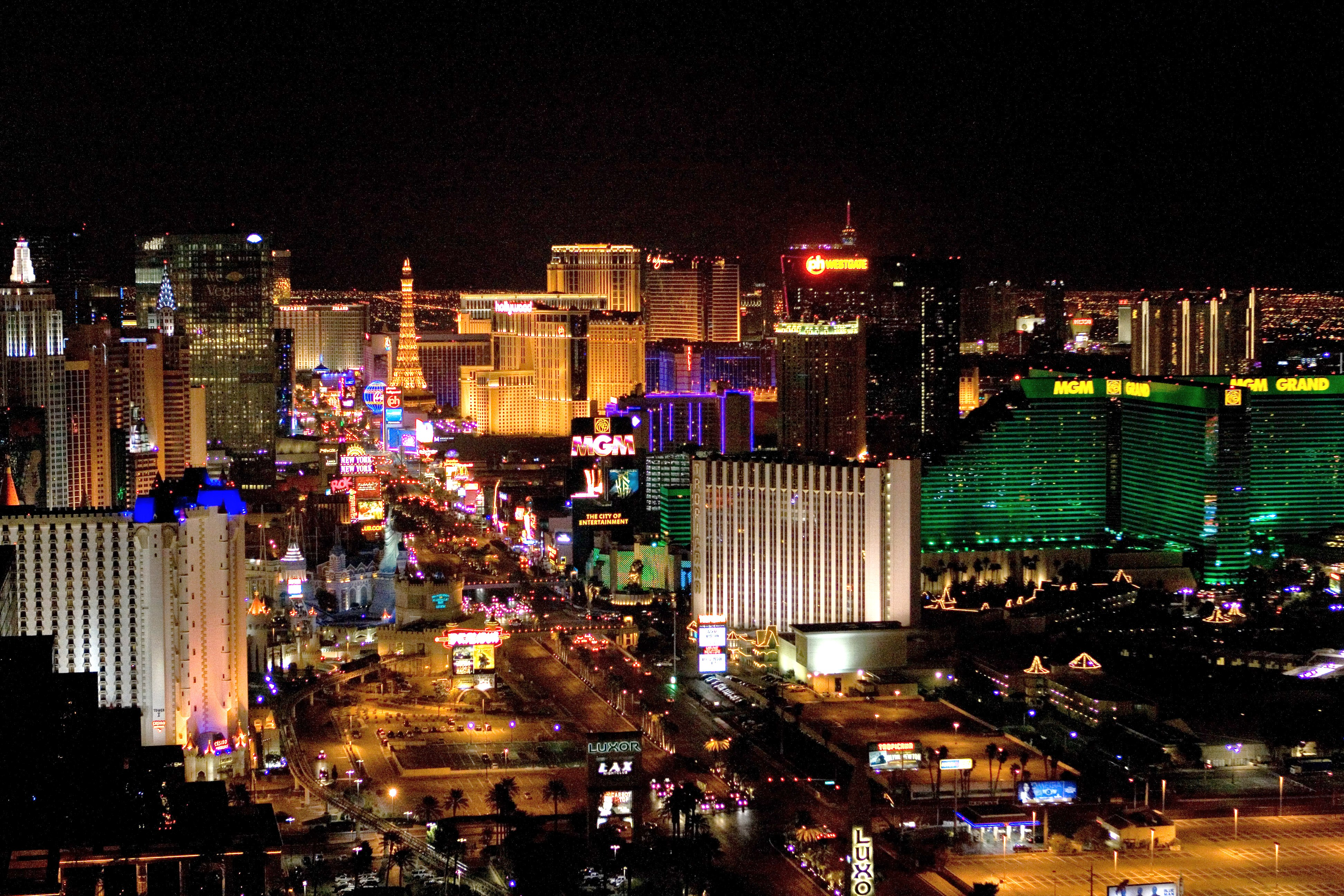
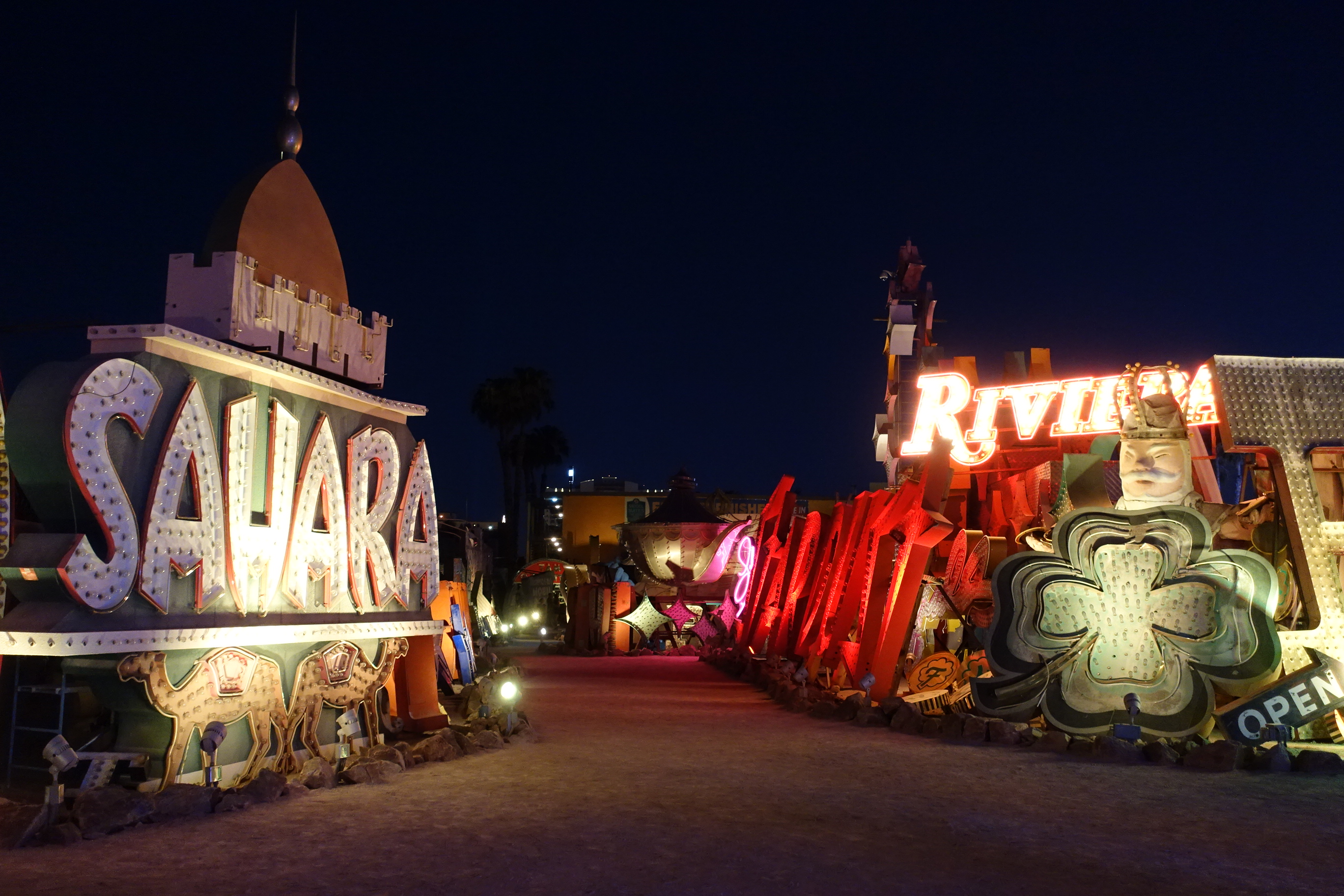
The music video for "Tonight", filmed in Las Vegas, features the members overlooking The Strip (left) at night and at the Neon Museum (right).

Billboard noted how "Tonight" was "more nuanced and sophisticated than many of [BigBang's] previous club anthems," and hailed it "four-minute sonic journey" to one of the group's concerts. The magazine ranked it number ten on their list of BigBang's must-listen songs. KpopStarz choose it as one of BigBang's definite songs, while Sun-Times named it one of the group's ten best songs, calling the single a "slick party anthem".

"Tonight" debuted at number two on South Korea's Gaon Digital Chart, at number one on the Download Chart and five on the Streaming Chart. On its second week, the single rose to a peak position atop the Digital and the Streaming charts, while remaining at number one on the Download Chart. Additionally, the single topped the Gaon BGM Chart upon release. By the end of 2011, "Tonight" was the eighth best-performing single of the year in South Korea, with over 2.3 million downloads sold. With over 23 million streams, the song was the tenth most streamed of 2011.

== Accolades ==
Awards and nominations for "Tonight"
Year	Award-giving body	Category	Result	Ref.
2011	Mnet Asian Music Awards	Best Dance Performance – Male Group	Nominated	
2011	Mnet Asian Music Awards	Song of the Year	Nominated	
2012	Myx Music Awards	Favorite K-Pop Video	Nominated	

Music program awards
Program	Date
M Countdown	March 3, 2011
M Countdown	March 10, 2011
M Countdown	March 17, 2011
Music Bank	March 4, 2011
Music Bank	March 11, 2011
Music Bank	March 18, 2011
Inkigayo	March 6, 2011
Inkigayo	March 13, 2011
Inkigayo	March 20, 2011

== Charts ==
=== Weekly charts ===
Chart (2011)	Peak position
Japan (Japan Hot 100)	65
South Korea (Gaon)	1
US World Digital Songs (Billboard)	19

Chart (2026)	Peak position
Singapore Regional (RIAS)	19

=== Monthly charts ===
Monthly chart performance
Chart (2011)	Peak position
South Korea (Gaon)	3

=== Year-end charts ===
Chart (2011)	Position
South Korea (Gaon)	8

== Sales and certifications ==
Region	Certification	Certified units/sales
Japan (RIAJ)	Gold	100,000^{*}
South Korea (Gaon)	—	2,454,322
^{*} Sales figures based on certification alone.
