= D'scover =

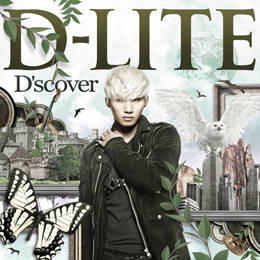
- CD cover

Studio album by D-Lite
- Released: February 27, 2013
- Recorded: 2012–2013
- Studios: Avaco Creative (Tokyo); Avex (Tokyo); Prime Sound Studio Form (Tokyo); YG (Seoul)
- Genres: J-pop; alternative rock
- Length: 58:23
- Language: Japanese
- Label: YGEX
- Producers: Kameda Seiji; Matsuo Kiyoshi; Sasaji Masanori; VERBAL (m-flo)

D-Lite chronology
D'scover (2013)	D'slove (2014)

Singles from D'scover
- 1. "Singer’s Ballad" Released: February 27, 2013; 2. "Wings (Japanese Version)" Released: February 27, 2013

D'scover is the debut Japanese studio album by South Korean artist, Daesung, also known by his Japanese stage name, D-Lite, member and main vocalist of boy band Big Bang. The album consists of a number of rearrangements and remakes of Japanese songs as well as multiple original pieces and was released on February 27, 2013.

== Background ==
Following the success of Big Bang's fifth mini-album, Alive, and their world tour, the members decided to pursue solo activities. During this time, the leader of BigBang, G-Dragon released his first mini-album and plans were made for another solo album by vocalist, Taeyang. The remaining members, T.O.P and Seungri, undertook ventures away from music such as acting and hosting and guesting on Japanese variety TV shows. Daesung himself wanted to release an album in Japan and began making preparations in late 2012.

== Promotion ==
=== Release ===
On December 5, 2012, a press release was held by Daesung's label YG Entertainment revealing their intentions to release a solo album on February 27, 2013. It was announced that is would be composed of 12 songs, including rearrangements of popular Japanese songs as well as his original songs "Baby Don't Cry" and "Wings". It was also announced that he would be holding his first solo concerts at Kobe’s World Memorial Hall from March 23 to the 24th and the Tokyo Nippon Budokan from March 30 to the 31st to promote the album.

A month before its release, on January 30, 2013, the track list and album covers were revealed, as well as details about the differing versions of the album. The album will be released in a CD only version, a CD and DVD version, and a Playbutton version. The DVD will contain music videos of "Singer's Ballad" (Japanese: 歌うたいのバラッド; Romanization: Utautai no Ballad) and "Wings" as well as a 'making of' video. Additionally, previews of multiple songs were released by various Japanese radio stations to promote the album.

On February 5, 2013, the music video (short version) for "Singer's Ballad" was released. Several days later, on February 9, 2013, the full music video for "Singer's Ballad" was aired on Japanese music video programs.

=== D'scover Tour 2013 in Japan ===
Initially, it was announced that Daesung would hold a total of four concerts at Kobe and Tokyo to promote the album. However, on February 28, it was announced that due to high demand, Daesung would be holding an additional 21 concerts over 17 cities, bringing the total to 25 concerts over 18 cities. The concert tour began on March 23 at Kobe's World Memorial Hall and ended on June 18 at Kanagawa's Yokohama Arena.

== Track listing ==
CD
No.	Title	Lyrics	Music	Original Artist	Length
1.	"Sunny Hill" (陽のあたる坂道; Hi no Ataru Sakamichi)	Do As Infinity	Do As Infinity	Do As Infinity	4:39
2.	"Love" (アイ; Ai)	Hata Motohiro	Hata Motohiro	Hata Motohiro (秦基博)	5:50
3.	"Singer's Ballad" (歌うたいのバラッド; Utautai no Ballad)	Kazuyoshi Saito	Kazuyoshi Saito	Kazuyoshi Saito (斉藤和義)	6:00
4.	"Powerful Boy" (全力少年; Zenryoku Shounen)	Ōhashi Takuya, Tokida Shintaro	Ōhashi Takuya, Tokida Shintaro	Sukima Switch (スキマスイッチ)	4:03
5.	"Hello"	Ayaka	Ayaka, Matsuura Akihisa	Ayaka (絢香)	4:49
6.	"Joyful" (じょいふる; Joifuru)	Mizuno Yoshiki	Mizuno Yoshiki	Ikimono-gakari (いきものがかり)	3:46
7.	"Like Overflowing with Kindness" (やさしさで溢れるように; Yasashisa de Afureru You ni)	Ogura Shinko, Kameda Seiji	Ogura Shinko	JUJU (ジュジュ)	4:59
8.	"Missing You Now" (逢いたくていま; Aitakute Ima)	MISIA	Jun Sasaki	MISIA (ミーシャ)	6:01
9.	"The Flower Bud Of My Dream" (夢の蕾; Yume no Tsubomi)	Fujimaki Ryota	Fujimaki Ryota	Remioromen (レミオロメン)	5:26
10.	"Baby Don't Cry" (Japanese Version)	Shoko Fujibayashi	e.knock	Daesung (D-Lite)	4:36
11.	"Wings" (Japanese Version)	RJ Project	G-Dragon, Choi Pil Kang	Daesung (D-Lite)	3:46
12.	"Tonight is Boogie Back" (今夜はブギ―・バック; Konya wa Boogie Back (feat. VERBAL of m-flo))	K.Ozawa, M.Koshima, S.Matsumoto, Y.Matsumoto	K.Ozawa, M.Koshima, S.Matsumoto, Y.Matsumoto	Kenji Ozawa (小沢健二)	4:28
Total length:					58:23

DVD
No.	Title	Length
1.	"Singer’s Ballad" (歌うたいのバラッド; Utautai no Ballad) (Music Video)
2.	"Wings" (Music Video)
3.	"Making of D'scover"

== Charts ==
=== Oricon Charts (Japan) ===
Release	Oricon Singles Chart	Peak position	Debut sales	Sales total	Chart run
February 27, 2013	Daily Chart	2		50,223	8 week
February 27, 2013	Weekly Chart	2	35,205	50,223	8 week
February 27, 2013	Monthly Chart (February)	9	35,205	50,223	8 week
February 27, 2013	Monthly Chart (March)	45	13,519	50,223	8 week
February 27, 2013	Yearly Chart			50,223	8 week

== Release history ==
Region	Date	Label	Format	Edition
Japan	February 27, 2013	YGEX	CD, Digital download	CD, CD+DVD, Playbutton
