= Love Song (BigBang song) =

Single by BigBang

from the album Big Bang Special Edition
- Language: Korean
- Released: April 8, 2011
- Studio: YG (Seoul)
- Genre: Pop rock; K-ballad
- Length: 3:45
- Label: YG
- Songwriters: G-Dragon; T.O.P; Teddy
- Producers: G-Dragon; Teddy

BigBang singles chronology
"Tonight" (2011)	"Love Song" (2011)	"Blue" (2012)

Music video
- "Love Song" on YouTube

"Love Song" is a song by South Korean group BigBang. It was released on April 8, 2011, by YG Entertainment, as the lead single for their album Big Bang Special Edition (2011), a repackaged version of the extended play (EP) Tonight released earlier on February 23, 2011. The lyrics were written by G-Dragon, T.O.P and Teddy, and the music was composed by G-Dragon and Teddy.

== Composition ==
Standing out from BigBang's usual "heavily produced electronic dance tracks", "Love Song" is pop-rock ballad that was compared to Coldplay's early material. An English version was later released on BigBang's second Japanese extended play With U. The single "utilizes building strings and overlapping vocals to create an uplifting tone despite the otherwise depressing lyrics" and combines "electronic rhythm and modern rock elements to express the nostalgia and agony of a loving woman who left the world." Additionally, the song was noted for its structure that alternates tension and relaxation in a "dreamlike" melody.

== Reception ==
"Love Song" was well received. Billboard named the track BigBang's sixth best song, praising the "excellent vocal performances". The music video ranked as the thirteenth best K-pop video by Stereogum. "Love Song" debuted at number nine on the Gaon Digital Chart. The following week, the single rose to number one on the Digital and Download charts, selling 413,645 copies. On its third week, the song reached the peak position of one in the Streaming chart. On Billboard World Digital Songs, "Love Song" spend two weeks at the second position, the highest peaking entry of the group until "Loser" topped the chart in 2015.

== Music video ==
The music video was posted on BigBang's channel on April 13, 2011. In the MV, the BigBang members walk around a barren land, exempt from piles of rubble and what seems like fire coming from the ground, whilst singing the song, as the camera zooms around abandoned and destroyed cars, broken stop signs, cracked grounds, and telephone poles. Whilst the BigBang Members are dancing, what seems to be either soot or snow falls, implying that a nuclear apocalypse took place.

== Accolades ==
Awards for "Love Song"
Year	Organization	Award	Result	Ref.
2011	Mnet Asian Music Awards	Best Music Video	Won	
2012	Gaon Chart K-Pop Awards	Song of the Month (April)	Won	

Music program awards
Program	Date
Inkigayo	April 17, 2011
Inkigayo	April 24, 2011
Inkigayo	May 1, 2011
M Countdown	April 28, 2011
Music Bank	April 22, 2011

== Charts ==
=== Weekly charts ===
Chart (2011)	Peak position
South Korea (Gaon)	1
US World Digital Song Sales (Billboard)	2

=== Monthly charts ===
Chart (2011)	Peak position
South Korea (Gaon)	1

=== Year-end charts ===
Chart (2011)	Position
South Korea (Gaon)	27

== Sales ==
Chart	Sales
South Korea (digital)	2,117,692
