= Tonight (BigBang EP) =

Mini 4
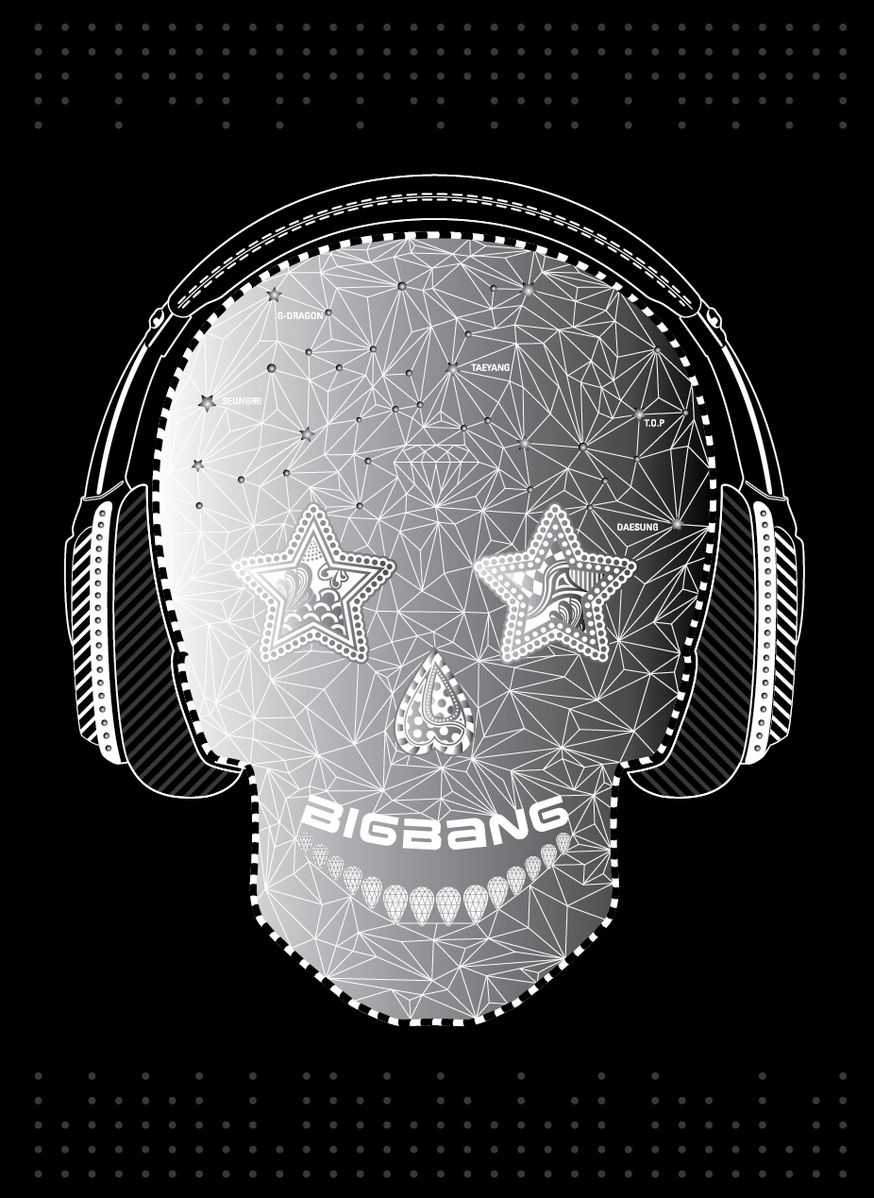

EP by BigBang
- Released: February 24, 2011
- Recorded: 2010–2011
- Studio: YG (Seoul)
- Genres: K-pop; hip hop; R&B; electropop
- Length: 20:05
- Language: Korean
- Labels: YG; Mnet Media
- Producer: G-Dragon

BigBang chronology
Big Bang (2009)	Mini 4 (2011)	Big Bang 2 (2011)

Singles from Mini 4
- 1. "Tonight" Released: February 24, 2011

Big Bang Special Edition
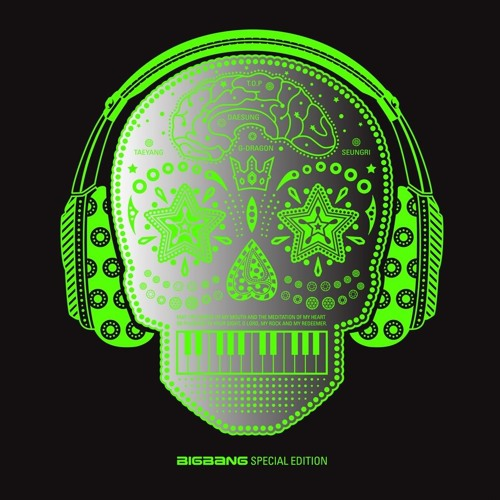

Singles from Big Bang Special Edition
- 1. "Love Song" Released: April 8, 2011

Mini 4 is the fourth extended play of South Korean boy band BigBang. It was their first new material released in South Korea after two-year hiatus as a group. Upon its release, the album and its lead single of the same name became a chart-topper in various South Korean and international music charts. It was released on February 24, 2011, under YG Entertainment. A repackaged edition titled Big Bang Special Edition was released on April 8, 2011, and featured a new track "Love Song" as the lead single.

== Background ==
While writing the songs for the then-untitled album, leader G-Dragon and lead rapper T.O.P began to break away to collaborate on their GD & T.O.P project. According to G-Dragon, the group was trying a "new combination" with their music, in which the vocalists Taeyang, Daesung, and Seungri were to record their own music as a trio while the remaining two were to branch off as a duo since they had not been with their fans for the past two years. Although the division of the group was initially for BigBang's materials only, G-Dragon and T.O.P saw positive response to their materials from the fans and went to Yang Hyun-suk, CEO of YG Entertainment, to allow the duo to release an album.

== Composition ==
After the promotions for GD & T.O.P collaboration ended, the group reunited to record the tracks to be included for Tonight. Songs from the album have been reportedly recorded variously over the two years span that the group was on hiatus. G-Dragon describes the music from the extended play as "very cheerful" in hopes of cheering up their listeners. Though the group's previous extended plays contained songs that were heavily influenced by electronic music, the group decided to concentrate more on "warm rock music."

Big Bang’s music has been very cheerful and lyrical so far, but this time we added rock. These days, people seem to find something interesting that can make them laugh and it might come from many accidents and incidents that happened last year, so we are going to present warm and cheerful music for those people rather than heavy and electronic music. — G-Dragon

== Promotion and release ==
After nearly two-year hiatus, BigBang made their comeback in South Korea in February 2011 which kicked off with their annual concert, Big Show 2011. There, they also showcased songs from Tonight, performing before an audience of 40,000 fans. The show was aired online by SBS and Mnet. The performance has been hailed as "sensual and stylish" as well as "luxurious" by Lee Soo-yeon of Newsen while it was called "fresh and bold" by Yonhap News, which also went on to state that "BigBang has come back brilliantly." Park Young-gun of the Star News also applauded the group for their use of lavish props, calling the performance "compelling" and "explosive" and declaring that "BigBang has come back stronger than ever." The show was watched by a nationwide audience of 5.7%, higher than the 4.9% expected. Revenues from the concert were reported to be ₩43 billion ($38 million).

Teaser photos of the group's music video for their lead single "Tonight", which was written solely by G-Dragon with the rap parts written by T.O.P, were also released online. The group also acknowledged their return to the music industry by posting it as their status on Taeyang's Twitter account.

== Reception ==
=== Critical reception ===
The EP has received mostly positive praises, with Expo Flat News complimenting it for its "impressive, sophisticated sound textures." The lead single "Tonight" was also praised for its "sophisticated electronic sound" paired with acoustic guitar. Lee Jeon-hyuk of Sports Chosun hailed the group's comeback as "brilliant" while Choi Jun of Asiae complimented the group's new direction in their music, acknowledging that during the two years of hiatus, the group's "style and musical sensibility [had] deepened." Despite this, the group have been criticized for their over-use of electronic sound.

=== Commercial performance ===
Tonight peaked at number one on the weekly Gaon Album Chart in addition to the monthly chart for February 2011. The album has sold 100,000 copies in South Korea. Internationally, it charted at number 3 on the Billboard World Albums chart, also number 3 on the Heatseekers chart, and number 29 on the Independent Albums chart. After the release of Big Bang Special Edition, it topped the weekly and monthly album charts in April 2011.

== Track listing ==
Mini 4 – Standard edition
No.	Title	Lyrics	Music	Arrangement	Length
1.	"Intro (Thank You & You)"	G-Dragon, T.O.P	G-Dragon, Choice37	Choice37	1:32
2.	"Hands Up" (Korean Version)	G-Dragon, T.O.P	G-Dragon, Kush	Kush	3:54
3.	"Tonight" (투나잇; Tunait)	G-Dragon, T.O.P	G-Dragon, Kush	P.K	3:39
4.	"Somebody to Love" (Korean Version)	G-Dragon, T.O.P	G-Dragon, Ham Seung-cheon, Kang Uk-Jin	Ham Seung-cheon, Kang Uk-Jin	3:32
5.	"What is Right"	G-Dragon, T.O.P	G-Dragon, D.J Murf, Peejay	D.J Murf, Peejay	3:43
6.	"Café"	G-Dragon, T.O.P	G-Dragon, D.J Murf, Peejay	D.J Murf, Peejay	3:40
Total length:					20:04

Tonight – Taiwanese edition DVD (bonus tracks)
No.	Title	Length
1.	"Tonight" (Music Video with Chinese Subtitles)

Big Bang Special Edition – Repackage
No.	Title	Lyrics	Music	Arrangement	Length
1.	"Love Song" (러브 송; Reobeu Song)	G-Dragon, T.O.P, Teddy	G-Dragon, Teddy	Teddy, Seo Won-jin	3:45
2.	"Stupid Liar" (스투피드 라이어; Seutupideu Raieo)	G-Dragon, T.O.P	G-Dragon, P.K	P.K, Dee.P	3:54
3.	"Tonight" (투나잇; Tunait)	G-Dragon, T.O.P	G-Dragon, Kush	P.K	3:43
4.	"High High" (G-Dragon & T.O.P)	G-Dragon, T.O.P, Teddy	Teddy	Teddy	3:10
5.	"Oh Yeah" (G-Dragon & T.O.P featuring Park Bom)	G-Dragon, T.O.P, Teddy	Teddy, Sunwoo Jung Ah	Teddy, Sunwoo Jung Ah	3:19
6.	"Café"	G-Dragon, T.O.P	G-Dragon, D.J Murf, Peejay	D.J Murf, Peejay	3:42
7.	"I Need a Girl" (Taeyang featuring G-Dragon)	Jun Goon, G-Dragon	Jun Goon, Choi Gub-won	Jun Goon	3:40
8.	"Somebody to Love" (Korean Version)	G-Dragon, T.O.P	G-Dragon, Ham Seung-cheon, Kang Uk-Jin	Ham Seung-cheon, Kang Uk-Jin	3:34
9.	"What Can I Do" (어쩌라고; Eojjeorago; Seungri solo)	Seungri, G-Dragon	Seungri, P.K, Big Tone	P.K	3:40
10.	"Baby Don't Cry" (Daesung solo)	Kush	Kush	Kush	4:31
Total length:					37:40

== Charts ==
=== Album ===
Tonight

Chart (2011)	Peak position
South Korean Weekly Albums (Gaon)	1
South Korean Monthly Albums (Gaon)	1
South Korean Year-end Albums (Gaon)	6
US World Albums (Billboard)	3
US Heatseekers Albums (Billboard)	7
US Independent Albums (Billboard)	29

BigBang Special Edition

Chart (2011)	Peak position
South Korean Weekly Albums (Gaon)	1
South Korean Monthly Albums (Gaon)	1
South Korean Year-end Albums (Gaon)	13

== Sales ==
Region	Sales amount
Japan	27,000
South Korea	155,117
South Korea (Big Bang Special Edition)	99,309

== Release history ==
Region	Date	Edition	Format	Label
Worldwide	February 24, 2011	Tonight	Digital download	YG
South Korea	February 24, 2011	Tonight	CD, digital download	YG; Mnet Media
Japan	April 13, 2011	Tonight	CD	Universal Music Japan
Taiwan	July 8, 2011	Tonight	CD+DVD	Warner Music Taiwan
Worldwide	April 8, 2011	Big Bang Special Edition	Digital download	YG
South Korea	April 8, 2011	Big Bang Special Edition	CD, digital download	YG; Mnet Media
Taiwan	July 8, 2011	Big Bang Special Edition	CD+DVD	Warner Music Taiwan
