= Big Bang Is V.I.P =

Big Bang is V.I.P
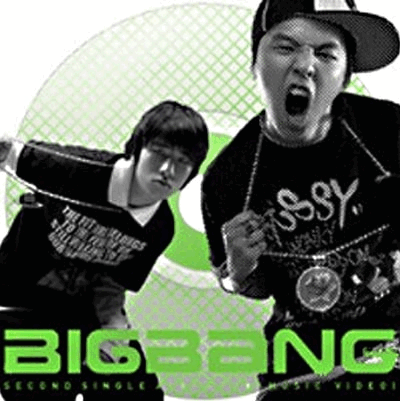

Single album by BigBang
- Released: September 28, 2006
- Recorded: 2006
- Genre: K-pop; hip hop; R&B
- Length: 12:56
- Language: Korean
- Label: YG
- Producer: G-Dragon; Kim Do-hyun; Perry; Israel Dwaine Cruz

BigBang chronology
Big Bang (2006)	Big Bang is V.I.P (2006)	Big Bang 03 (2006)

Singles from Big Bang Is V.I.P
- 1. "La La La" Released: September 28, 2006

Big Bang is V.I.P (also known as Big Bang Second Single) is the second single album by the South Korean boy band BigBang, released by YG Entertainment on September 28, 2006. It spawned the single "La La La".

== Release ==
The title track "La La La", was written by all the members of the group in collaboration, with sections from the YG reality show's theme song. The style is a mix of R&B, hip-hop and pop. The release of Big Bang is V.I.P includes a VCD with music videos of songs from BigBang's first single album and self-filmed videos. BigBang won Rookie of the Month (October) for "La La La" at the Cyworld Digital Music Awards.

== Track listing ==
Big Bang Is V.I.P track listing
No.	Title	Lyrics	Music	Arrangement	Length
1.	"La La La"	Big Bang	Perry	Perry	3:00
2.	"Ma Girl" (Taeyang feat. G-Dragon & T.O.P)	G-Dragon	Israel Dwaine Cruz	Israel Dwaine Cruz	3:52
3.	"V.I.P."	Big Bang	G-Dragon; Kim Do-hyun	Kim Do-hyun	3:04
4.	"La La La" (instrumental)		Perry	Perry	3:00
Total length:					12:52

CD+VCD Edition – VCD bonus tracks
No.	Title	Length
1.	"We Belong Together" (Music Video)
2.	""A Fool's Only Tears (눈물뿐인 바보; Nunmulppunin Babo)" (Music Video)
3.	"This Love" (Music Video)
4.	"Big Bang in Japan"

== Charts and sales ==
=== Monthly charts ===
Chart (September 2006)	Peak position
South Korean Albums (MIAK)	8

=== Yearly charts ===
Chart (2006)	Position
South Korean Albums (RIAK)	44

=== Sales ===
Region	Sales
South Korea (MIAK)	32,503
