= Big Bang (single album) =

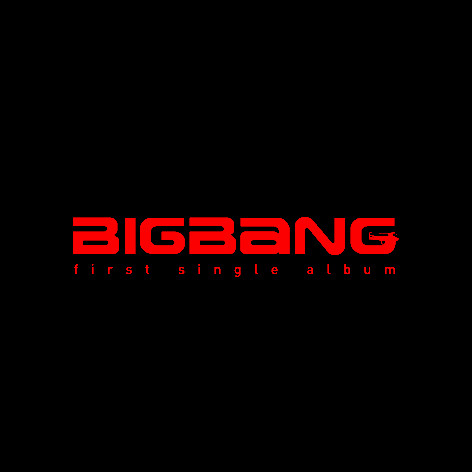

Single album by BigBang
- Released: August 28, 2006
- Recorded: 2006
- Genre: K-pop; hip hop; R&B
- Length: 12:52
- Language: Korean
- Label: YG
- Producer: G-Dragon; Brave Brothers; Jeon Seung-woo

BigBang chronology
Big Bang (2006)	Big Bang Is V.I.P (2006)

Singles from Big Bang
- 1. "We Belong Together" Released: August 28, 2006

Big Bang (also known as Big Bang First Single) is the debut single album by South Korean boy band BigBang, released via YG Entertainment on August 28, 2006. It spawned the single "We Belong Together", featuring labelmate Park Bom, who would later debut as a member of 2NE1. Commercially, the single album peaked at number five on the monthly MIAK album charts in South Korea and sold nearly 44,000 copies by 2016.

== Composition ==
G-Dragon and T.O.P composed several of the tracks on the single album; band leader G-Dragon composed the title track "We Belong Together" while he along with T.O.P. wrote the lyrics. The song is an R&B track that presents a rhythmic up-tempo tune with rap passages. The song "This Love" is a remake of the song of the same name by Maroon 5.

== Commercial performance ==
Upon its release, Big Bang First Single debuted and peaked at number five on the monthly MIAK album chart issue for August 2006, selling 17,159 copies within three days. In the following month, it dropped to number 16 and sold an additional 9,452 copies. On the 2006 year-end album chart ranking, Big Bang First Single sold 36,420 copies and was the 35th best-selling album of the year in South Korea. Total sales grew to almost 40,000 copies by February 2007.

== Track listing ==
Big Bang First Single track listing
No.	Title	Lyrics	Music	Arrangement	Length
1.	"Intro (Put Your Hands Up)"	G-Dragon	G-Dragon; Brave Brothers	Brave Brothers	1:22
2.	"We Belong Together" (featuring Park Bom)	G-Dragon; T.O.P	G-Dragon	G-Dragon; Teddy	3:58
3.	"A Fool's Only Tears" (눈물뿐인 바보; Nunmulppunin Babo)	An Young-min; G-Dragon	Jeon Seung-woo	Jeon Seung-woo	4:03
4.	"This Love" (G-Dragon solo)	G-Dragon	G-Dragon; James Valentine; Adam Levine; Ryan Dusick; Mickey Madden; Jesse Carmichael	G-Dragon	3:30
Total length:					12:52

CD+DVD Edition – DVD bonus tracks
No.	Title	Length
1.	"Big Bang Documentary" (10 Parts)

== Charts and sales ==
=== Monthly charts ===
Chart (August 2006)	Peak position
South Korean Albums (MIAK)	5

=== Yearly charts ===
Chart (2006)	Position
South Korean Albums (RIAK)	35

=== Sales ===
Region	Sales
South Korea (MIAK)	40,000
