= Special Final in Dome Memorial Collection =

EP by BigBang
- Released: December 5, 2012
- Genre: Dance Pop; hip hop; R&B
- Length: 21:41
- Language: Japanese; English
- Label: YGEX
- Producer: Yang Hyun-suk (exec.); Max Matsuura (exec.); G-Dragon; Teddy Park

BigBang chronology
Alive (2012)	Special Final in Dome Memorial Collection (2012)	The Best of Big Bang 2006–2014 (2014)

Special Final in Dome Memorial Collection is the third Japanese extended play by South Korean boy band BigBang, released on December 5, 2012. It was released as a part of their 2012 Alive concert tour.

== Background ==
BigBang became the first Korean musical artists to perform in all three of Japan's biggest dome venues: Tokyo's Tokyo Dome, Osaka's Kyocera Dome and Fukuoka's Yahoo! Japan Dome. It was announced on November 6, 2012, That they will release a special mini-album featuring five songs by the members respective solo projects and the Japanese version of the group song "Fantastic Baby".

== Chart performance ==
The EP charted six on Oricon album chart, selling 45,910 copies in the first week.

== Track listing ==
No.	Title	Lyrics	Music	Artist	Length
1.	"That XX" (Japanese Version)	G-Dragon, Teddy	G-Dragon, Teddy	G-Dragon	3:19
2.	"Wedding Dress" (English Version)	Perry	Teddy, Taeyang	Taeyang	4:06
3.	"Wings" (Japanese Version)	G-Dragon, Daesung	G-Dragon, Pil Kang Choi	Daesung	3:42
4.	"What Can I Do" (Japanese Version)	Seungri, G-Dragon, Sunny Boy	Seungri, Pil Kang Choi	Seungri	3:36
5.	"High High" (Japanese Version)	G-Dragon, T.O.P, Teddy, Sunny Boy	Teddy	G-Dragon & T.O.P	3:05
6.	"Fantastic Baby" (Japanese Version)	G-Dragon, T.O.P, Verbal	Teddy, G-Dragon	BigBang	3:50
Total length:					21:41

CD+DVD Edition – DVD bonus tracks
No.	Title	Length
1.	"Monster" (Music Video)
2.	"Alive (Intro)" (Live in a-nation stadium festival 2012.8.26)
3.	"Tonight" (Live in a-nation stadium festival 2012.8.26)
4.	"Hands Up" (Live in a-nation stadium festival 2012.8.26)
5.	"Fantastic Baby" (Live in a-nation stadium festival 2012.8.26)
6.	"Bad Boy" (Live in a-nation stadium festival 2012.8.26)
7.	"Feeling" (Live in a-nation stadium festival 2012.8.26)
8.	"Gara Gara Go!" (Live in a-nation stadium festival 2012.8.26)
9.	"My Heaven" (Live in a-nation stadium festival 2012.8.26)
10.	"BigBang Alive Tour 2012 in Japan MC" (Digest)
11.	"BigBang 2009 Behind the Scenes" (Digest)

== Charts ==
=== Weekly charts ===
Chart (2012)	Peak position	Sales
Japan Weekly Album Chart (Oricon)	6	69,795

== Release history ==
Region	Date	Format	Label
Japan	December 5, 2012	CD; CD+DVD; digital download	YGEX
