= List of Gaon Digital Chart number ones of 2012 =

The Gaon Digital Chart of Gaon Music Chart is a chart that ranks the best-performing songs in South Korea. The data is collected by the Korea Music Content Association. It consists of a weekly chart, listed from Sunday to Saturday, and a monthly chart.

== Weekly charts ==
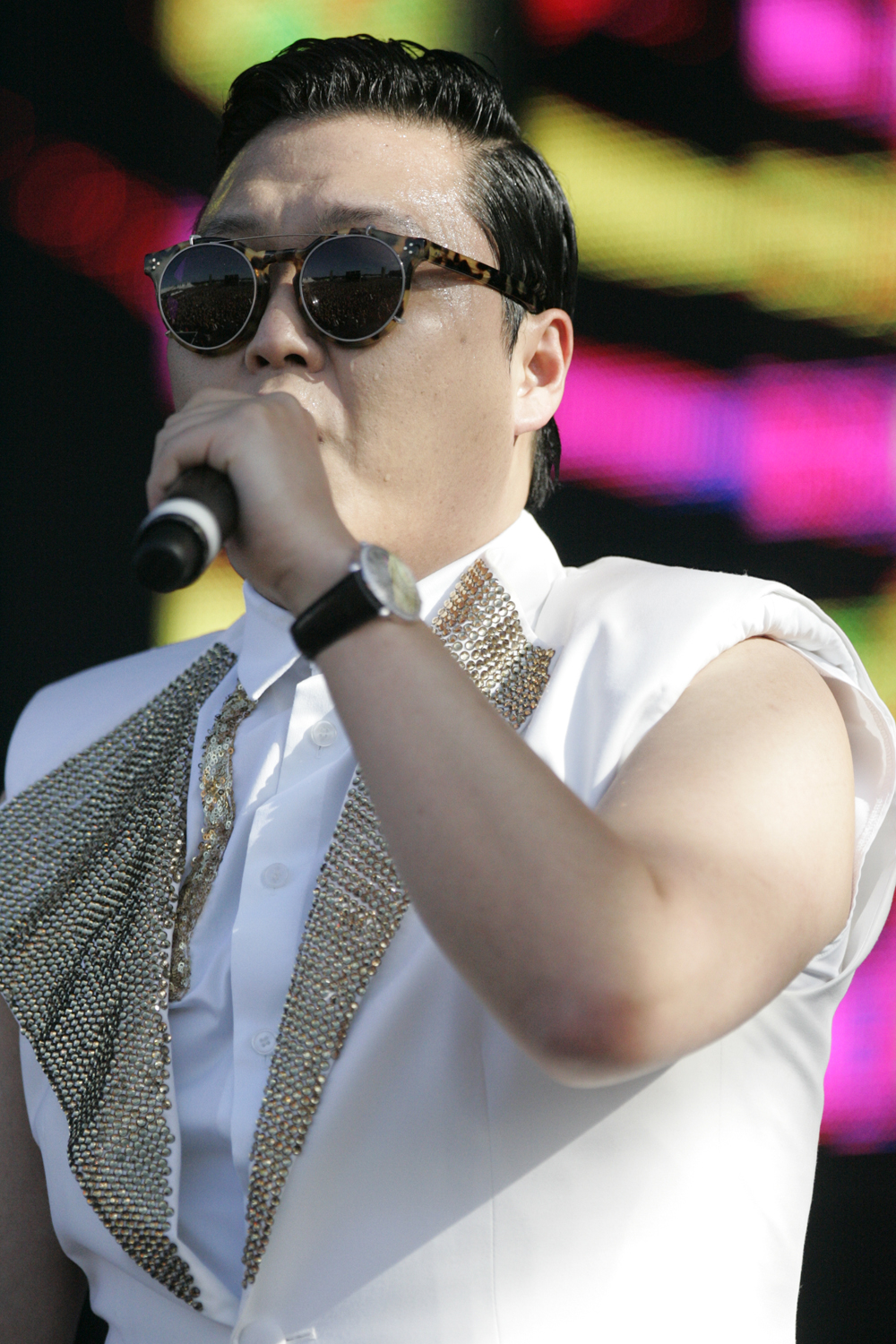
Psy earned the year's best-performing single with "Gangnam Style".

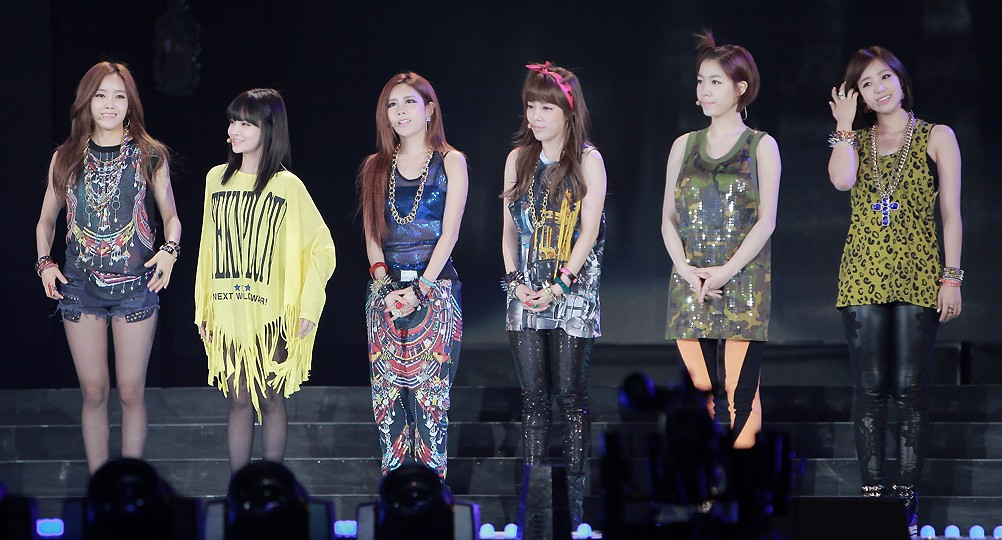
T-ara's "Lovey-Dovey" was the best performing song of January.

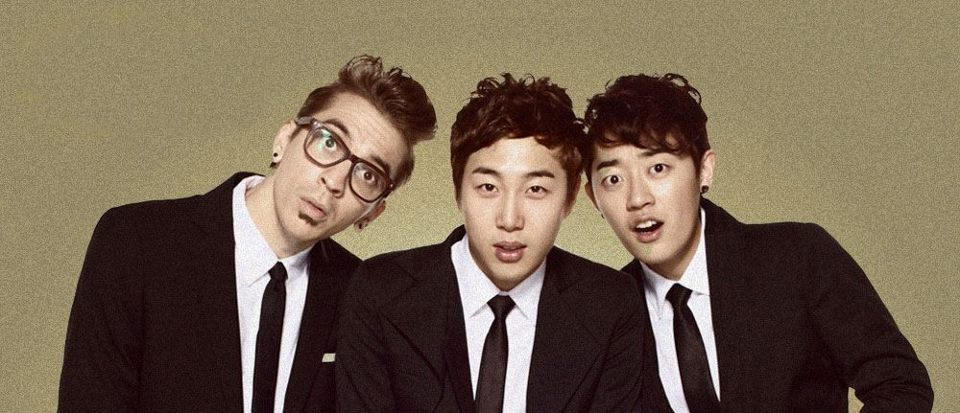
Busker Busker scored two number-one hits in 2012, with "Cherry Blossom Ending" and "If You Really Love Me".

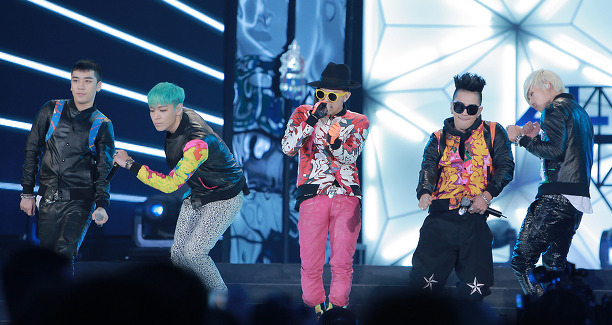
Big Bang scored two monthly number-one singles in 2012, the most out of any act.

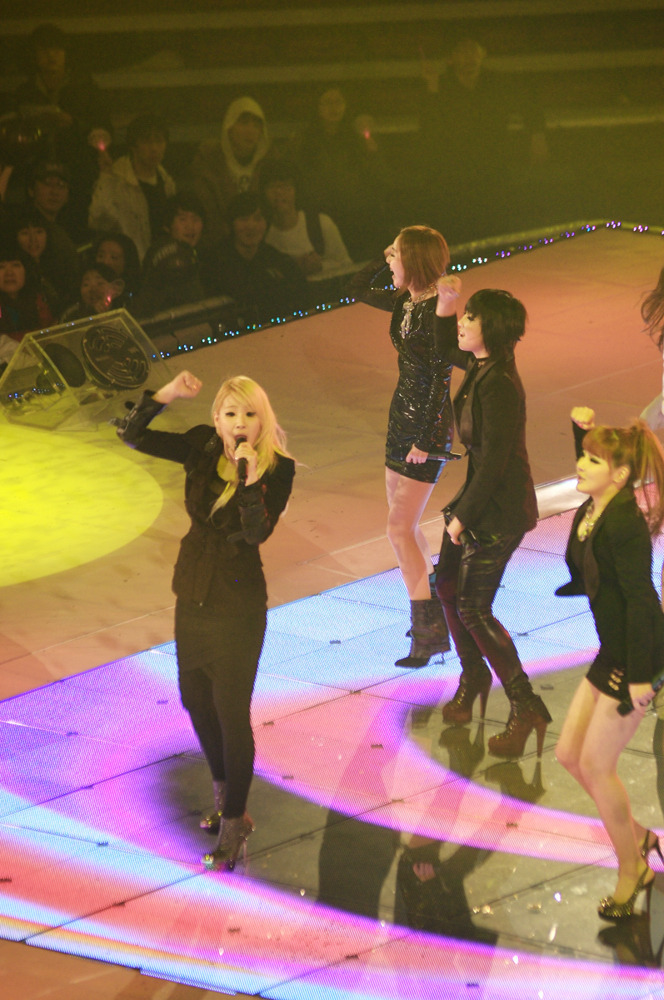
2NE1's "I Love You" was the best performing song of July.

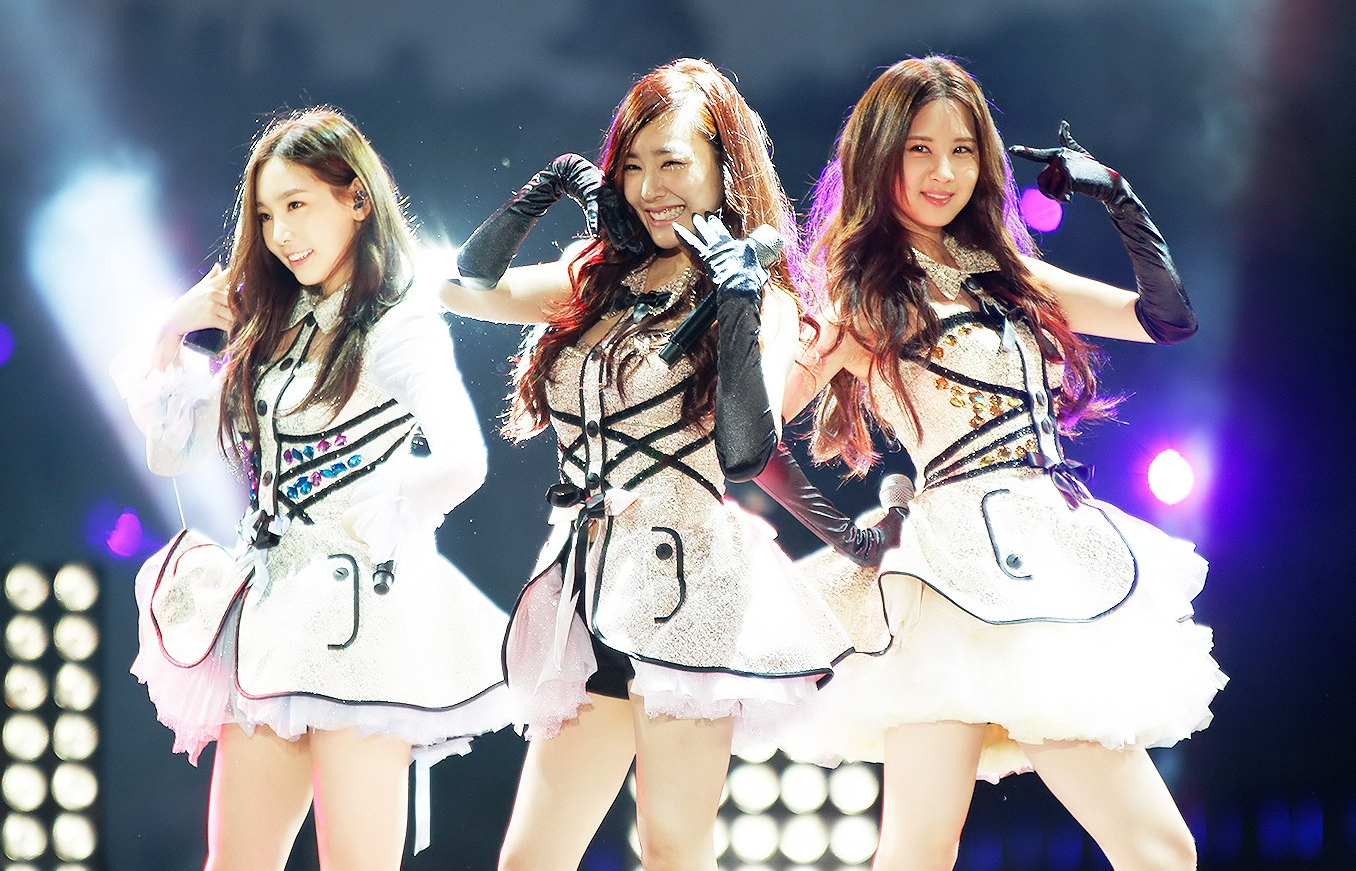
Girls' Generation-TTS's "Twinkle" was the best performing song of May.

Key
| † | Indicates best-performing single of 2012 |

Source: Gaon Weekly Digital Chart
| Week end date | Song | Artist | Total Downloads |
|---|---|---|---|
| January 7 | "Lovey-Dovey" | T-ara | 540,458 |
| January 14 | "The Story of a Tall Bachelor" (키 큰 노총각 이야기) | Jeong Jun-ha | 623,496 |
| January 21 | "Lovey-Dovey" | T-ara | 354,144 |
| January 28 | "I Knew It" (이럴 줄 알았어) | Beast | 372,501 |
| February 4 | "When I Can't Sing" (내가 노래를 못해도) | Se7en | 493,651 |
| February 11 | "Back in Time" (시간을 거슬러) | Lyn | 353,903 |
| February 18 | "I Need You" (니가 필요해) | K.Will | 396,678 |
| February 25 | "Blue" | Big Bang | 833,233 |
| March 3 | "Blue" | Big Bang | 537,161 |
| March 10 | "Blue" | Big Bang | 348,535 |
| March 17 | "I Wonder If You Hurt Like Me" (너도 나처럼) | 2AM | 662,901 |
| March 24 | "Sherlock (Clue + Note)" | Shinee | 520,204 |
| March 31 | "Hey You" | CN Blue | 350,176 |
| April 7 | "Cherry Blossom Ending" (벚꽃 엔딩) | Busker Busker | 522,232 |
| April 14 | "Cherry Blossom Ending" (벚꽃 엔딩) | Busker Busker | 358,823 |
| April 21 | "Alone" (나 혼자) | Sistar | 447,718 |
| April 28 | "Alone" (나 혼자) | Sistar | 323,422 |
| May 5 | "Twinkle" | Girls' Generation-TTS | 604,870 |
| May 12 | "Voice" (목소리) | Baek Ji-young featuring Gary of Leessang | 529,920 |
| May 19 | "Every End of the Day" (하루 끝) | IU | 415,891 |
| May 26 | "Every End of the Day" (하루 끝) | IU | 275,146 |
| June 2 | "Twinkle" | Girls' Generation-TTS | 163,646 |
| June 9 | "Monster" | BigBang | 757,501 |
| June 16 | "Electric Shock" | f(x) | 630,510 |
| June 23 | "If You Really Love Me" (정말로 사랑한다면) | Busker Busker | 388,510 |
| June 30 | "If You Really Love Me" (정말로 사랑한다면) | Busker Busker | 388,784 |
| July 7 | "Loving U" | Sistar | 440,960 |
| July 14 | "I Love You" | 2NE1 | 469,850 |
| July 21 | "Gangnam Style" (강남스타일) | Psy | 816,868 |
| July 28 | "Gangnam Style" (강남스타일) | Psy | 473,372 |
| August 4 | "Gangnam Style" (강남스타일) | Psy | 333,592 |
| August 11 | "Gangnam Style" (강남스타일) | Psy | 289,995 |
| August 18 | "Gangnam Style" (강남스타일) | Psy | 261,797 |
| August 25 | "I Need You" | Huh Gak featuring Zia | 365,872 |
| September 1 | "All for You" | Jung Eun-ji and Seo In-guk | 409,284 |
| September 8 | "That XX" (그 XX) | G-Dragon | 428,762 |
| September 15 | "All for You" | Jung Eun-ji and Seo In-guk | 280,745 |
| September 22 | "Memory of the Wind" (바람기억) | Naul | 452,899 |
| September 29 | "Memory of the Wind" (바람기억) | Naul | 432,591 |
| October 6 | "Memory of the Wind" (바람기억) | Naul | 244,051 |
| October 13 | "It's Cold" | Epik High featuring Lee Hi | 532,868 |
| October 20 | "Becoming Dust" (먼지가 되어) | Jung Joon Young and Roy Kim | 525,881 |
| October 27 | "Ice Cream" | Hyuna | 454,650 |
| November 3 | "1, 2, 3, 4" | Lee Hi | 667,549 |
| November 10 | "1, 2, 3, 4" | Lee Hi | 351,747 |
| November 17 | "1, 2, 3, 4" | Lee Hi | 237,719 |
| November 24 | "Return" (되돌리다) | Lee Seung-gi | 420,958 |
| December 1 | "Return" (되돌리다) | Lee Seung-gi | 480,759 |
| December 8 | "Return" (되돌리다) | Lee Seung-gi | 301,153 |
| December 15 | "Because It's Christmas" (크리스마스니까) | Sung Si-kyung, Park Hyo-shin, Lee Seok-hoon, Seo In-guk and VIXX | 272,901 |
| December 22 | "You Are Attractive" (매력있어) | Akdong Musician | 226,223 |
| December 29 | "Dancing Queen" | Girls' Generation | 263,376 |

== Monthly charts ==
Source: Gaon Monthly Digital Chart
| Month | Song | Artist | Aggregate points | Total Downloads | Year-end Chart | Ref |
|---|---|---|---|---|---|---|
| January | "Lovey-Dovey" | T-ara | 142,691,767 | 1,903,727 | 7 | |
| February | "Blue" | BigBang | 102,380,663 | 1,351,429 | 10 | |
| March | "Fantastic Baby" | BigBang | 105,296,671 | 1,229,518 | 5 | |
| April | "Cherry Blossom Ending" | Busker Busker | 169,546,447 | 1,570,146 | 2 | |
| May | "Twinkle" | Girls' Generation-TTS | 119,415,981 | 997,122 | 11 | |
| June | "Like This" | Wonder Girls | 138,592,996 | 1,444,339 | 18 | |
| July | "I Love You" | 2NE1 | 151,627,608 | 1,522,263 | 6 | |
| August | "Gangnam Style" | Psy | 150,855,485 | 1,280,050 | 1 | |
| September | "All for You" | Jung Eun-ji and Seo In-guk | 113,858,049 | 1,037,911 | 8 | |
| October | "Bloom" | Gain | 115,479,048 | 1,182,829 | 42 | |
| November | "1, 2, 3, 4" | Lee Hi | 132,391,547 | 1,210,297 | 23 | |
| December | "Return" | Lee Seung-gi | 110,364,099 | 896,196 | 37 | |
