= Alive Galaxy Tour =

2012–13 concert tour by Big Bang

- Tour by Big Bang
- Promotional handbill for the tour
- Location: Asia; South America; Europe; North America
- Associated album: Alive
- Start date: March 2, 2012
- End date: January 27, 2013
- No. of shows: 48
- Attendance: 800,000
- Box office: US$73 million ($102.37 million in 2025 dollars)
- Website: alive.ygbigbang.com

Big Bang concert chronology
- Love and Hope Tour (2011); Alive Galaxy Tour (2012–13); Japan Dome Tour (2013–14)

The Alive Galaxy Tour (referred to as the Alive Tour) was the first worldwide concert tour and sixth overall by South Korean boy band Big Bang. It promotes the group's fifth Korean-language EP, Alive (as well as their fourth Japanese-language studio album of the same name), across four continents: Asia, North America, South America and Europe. The group hired choreographer and creative director Laurieann Gibson to direct the show. The tour was officially sponsored by Samsung Galaxy.

In total, an estimated 800,000 fans worldwide attended the tour.

== Background and development ==
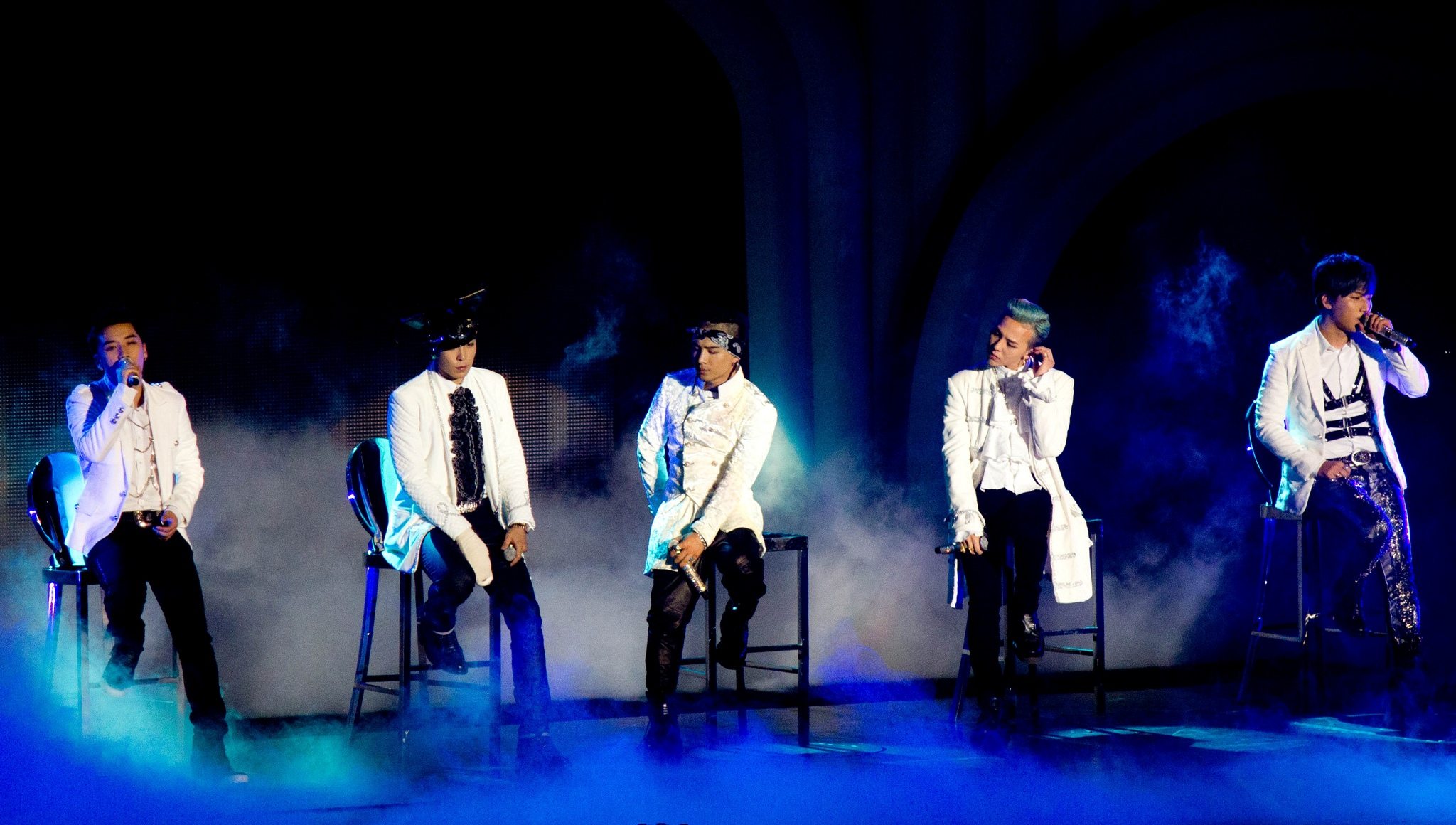
Big Bang performing in Singapore

In support of their fifth extended Korean-language EP, Alive and their fourth Japanese-language studio album of the same name, released February 29 and March 28, 2012, respectively, BigBang's record label YG Entertainment announced that the group intended to hold a world tour in partnership with tour promoter Live Nation, visiting Asia, North America, South America and Europe. Live Nation president Alan Ridgeway stated, "We are very happy that we are working with YG Entertainment and Big Bang to show [our work] to worldwide K-pop fans." A representative for YG Entertainment followed this with, "We are working hard to hold the best concert with the best production team to equal the anticipation of the world fans who are waiting for the first concert they will get to meet Big Bang.

Choreographer and creative director Laurieann Gibson, famed for her work with Lady Gaga, was hired as the tour's director and choreographer. US-based visual contents company Possible Productions was hired to create the Alive tour's custom backdrops. The team described the concept as a "bleak futuristic world [that could only be] saved by Big Bang." Lighting and staging, as well as overall production, was designed by Leroy Bennet. Staging and lighting alone was estimated at US$1.3 million. Korean electronics brand Samsung was contracted as the tour's official sponsor, who provided electronics for the members and touring staff on the dates. This marks the first time the group has conducted a worldwide concert tour. The December 5 concert at the Tokyo Dome was broadcast on TBS1 on February 24, 2013.

== Commercial performance ==
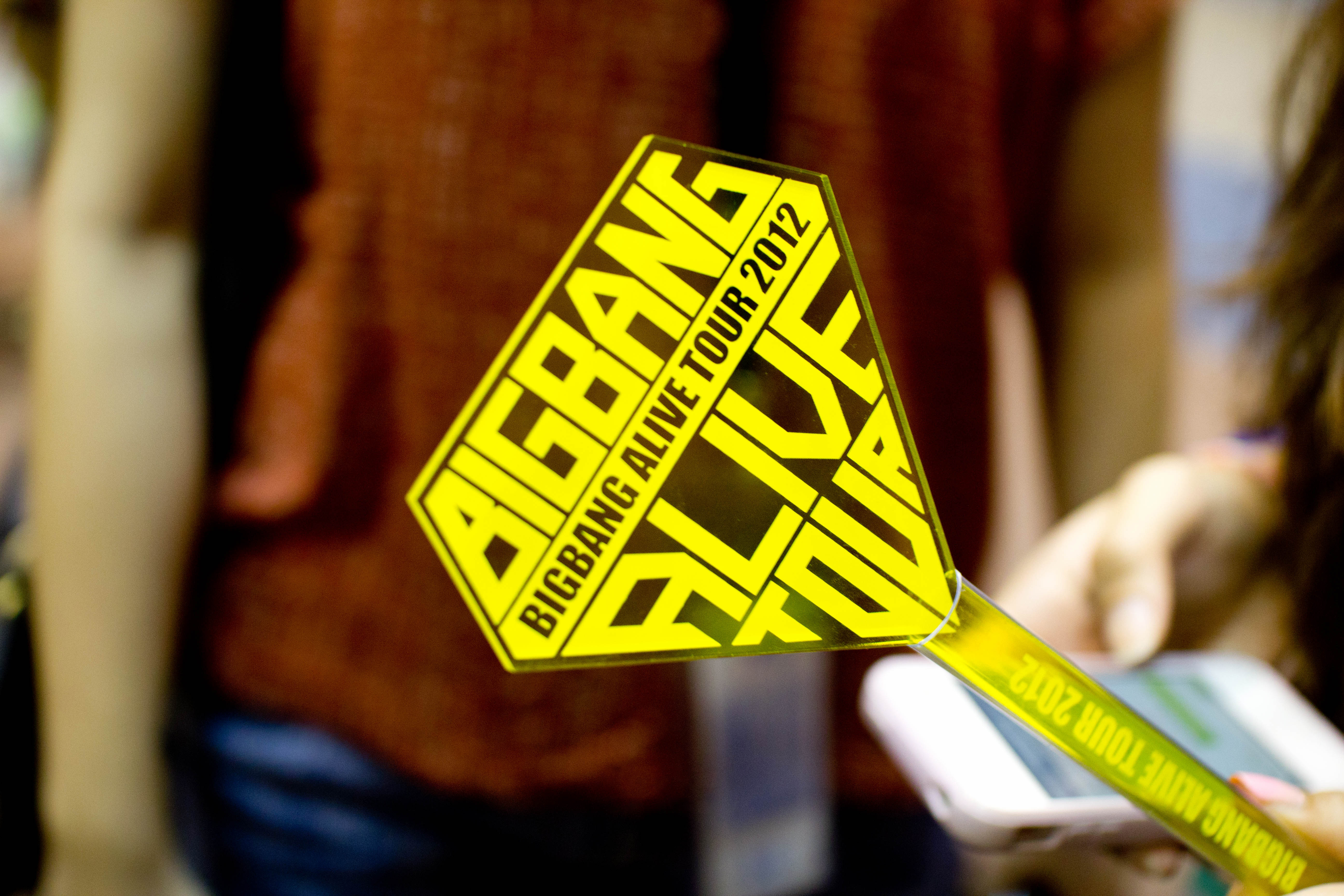
Fan holding a Big Bang stick at a concert

Tickets for the group's world tour, which kicked off in Seoul in March 2012, sold out faster than Live Nation had anticipated. In Singapore, all tickets were sold out shortly after its on sale and a second show was immediately announced to cope with the huge ticket demand from fans. Later in Malaysia, they attracted more than 3,500 fans to queue up at the box office to fight for their tickets. In Taiwan, all 22,000 tickets of their 2 shows were sold out within just a few hours.

Owing to strong demand from fans in the United States, two additional concert dates in both Los Angeles and New Jersey, November 2 and 8, were added. There were initially doubts if T.O.P could perform due to an injury, but it was reported that he would continue to perform. In Japan, BigBang became the first Korean artist to perform three Dome concerts, at the Tokyo Dome, Kyocera Dome, and Fukuoka Dome.

Ticket prices for their concert in Hong Kong were reported to cost as much as $1,680 HKD (more than 200 US Dollars) The concert was held in Lima, Peru on November 14, 2012. The Orange County Register reported that ticket prices ranged from $50 to $300 for the group's Honda Center dates in Los Angeles. In the UK all the tickets for the Wembley Arena show sold out within two hours of tickets going on sale, resulting in a second date being added shortly after. They also managed to set a London concert record for the largest crowd gathered to see a Korean act in the United Kingdom.

The tour listed on Pollstar's year-end list, on the Top 200 North American Tours, BigBang become the first Korean artist to have made the list, as they ranked at number 155 and earned $5 million from four shows.

== Critical reception ==
The New York Times journalist Jon Caramanica wrote that BigBang performed more than two dozen songs wearing almost as many outfits, and in unusual setups such as "taking the stage on gilded Segways and lowrider bicycles" during their "short but loud American tour".

Billboard K-Town columnist Jeff Benjamin reported that concertgoers were treated to breakdancing and Taeyang's gymnastics for a few on-stage flips during BigBang's concert at the Prudential Center in New Jersey, and described the band's concerts in America as "a success for all".

Joseph Lapin from the Californian newspaper OC Weekly attended BigBang's concert in Los Angeles and reported that the atmosphere during the show was "almost palpable". Lapin concluded, "It was nostalgic, a throwback to old-school hip-hop but with a commercial twist and a foreign reinterpretation...these boys, well, they'll be back, and they know they're going to be superstars".

The Guardian's music journalist Caroline Sullivan praised BigBang for holding a "fabulous spectacle" at the Wembley Arena in London. She compared BigBang with other Western music bands, and noted that BigBang's edges "are crisper, the sound louder, the dancing sharper".

Radio Programas del Perú ranked the tour as the best K-pop concert in South America for 2012, beating out earlier concerts performed by JYJ, U-Kiss and a Music Bank (TV series) concert at Chile.

== Set list ==
First show in Nagoya
1. "Tonight"
2. "Hands Up"
3. "Fantastic Baby"
4. "How Gee"
5. "Stupid Liar"
6. "Knockout" (GD & TOP)
7. "High High" (GD&TOP)
8. "Strong Baby" + "What Can I Do" (Seungri)
9. "Gara Gara Go!" + "Number 1"
10. "Cafe"
11. "Bad Boy"
12. "Blue"
13. "Love Song"
14. "Feeling"
15. "Look Only At Me" + "Wedding Dress" (Taeyang)
16. "Wings" (Daesung)
17. "Haru Haru"
18. "Lies"
19. "Last Farewell"

Encore

1. "Let Me Hear Your Voice"
2. "My Heaven"

Re-Encore

1. "Bad Boy"
2. "Fantastic Baby"
Final in Seoul (Day 3)
1. "Tonight"
2. "Hands Up"
3. "Fantastic Baby"
4. "How Gee"
5. "Stupid Liar"
6. "Crayon" (G-Dragon)
7. "High High" (GD&TOP)
8. "Strong Baby" + "What Can I Do" (Seungri)
9. "Gara Gara Go" + "Number 1"
10. "Cafe"
11. "Bad Boy"
12. "Blue"
13. "Love Song"
14. "Monster"
15. "Feeling"
16. "Look Only At Me" + "Wedding Dress" (Taeyang)
17. "Wings" (Daesung)
18. "Haru Haru"
19. "Lies"
20. "Last Farewell"

Encore

1. "Heaven"

Re-Encore

1. "Feeling"
2. "Fantastic Baby"
3. "High High"
4. "Bad Boy"
5. "Hands Up"

== Tour dates ==
Date	City	Country	Venue	Attendance
March 2, 2012	Seoul	South Korea	Olympic Gymnastics Arena	40,000
March 3, 2012	Seoul	South Korea	Olympic Gymnastics Arena	40,000
March 4, 2012	Seoul	South Korea	Olympic Gymnastics Arena	40,000
May 17, 2012	Nagoya	Japan	Nippon Gaishi Hall	150,000
May 18, 2012	Nagoya	Japan	Nippon Gaishi Hall	150,000
May 25, 2012	Yokohama	Japan	Yokohama Arena	150,000
May 26, 2012	Yokohama	Japan	Yokohama Arena	150,000
May 27, 2012	Yokohama	Japan	Yokohama Arena	150,000
May 31, 2012	Osaka	Japan	Osaka-jō Hall	150,000
June 1, 2012	Osaka	Japan	Osaka-jō Hall	150,000
June 2, 2012	Osaka	Japan	Osaka-jō Hall	150,000
June 3, 2012	Osaka	Japan	Osaka-jō Hall	150,000
June 16, 2012	Saitama	Japan	Saitama Super Arena	150,000
June 17, 2012	Saitama	Japan	Saitama Super Arena	150,000
June 23, 2012	Fukuoka	Japan	Marine Messe Fukuoka	150,000
June 24, 2012	Fukuoka	Japan	Marine Messe Fukuoka	150,000
July 21, 2012	Shanghai	China	Mercedes-Benz Arena	30,000
July 28, 2012	Guangzhou	China	Guangzhou International Sports Arena	30,000
August 4, 2012	Beijing	China	MasterCard Center	30,000
September 28, 2012	Singapore		Singapore Indoor Stadium	20,000
September 29, 2012	Singapore		Singapore Indoor Stadium	20,000
October 5, 2012	Bangkok	Thailand	Impact Arena	20,000
October 6, 2012	Bangkok	Thailand	Impact Arena	20,000
October 12, 2012	Jakarta	Indonesia	Mata Elang International Stadium	30,000
October 13, 2012	Jakarta	Indonesia	Mata Elang International Stadium	30,000
October 20, 2012	Taipei	Taiwan	Taipei Arena	20,000
October 21, 2012	Taipei	Taiwan	Taipei Arena	20,000
October 24, 2012	Manila	Philippines	SM Mall of Asia Arena	12,000
October 27, 2012	Kuala Lumpur	Malaysia	Stadium Merdeka	18,000
November 2, 2012	Anaheim	United States	Honda Center	21,914
November 3, 2012	Anaheim	United States	Honda Center	21,914
November 8, 2012	Newark	United States	Prudential Center	18,362
November 9, 2012	Newark	United States	Prudential Center	18,362
November 14, 2012	Lima	Peru	Jockey Club del Perú	17,000
November 23, 2012	Osaka	Japan	Kyocera Dome Osaka	100,000
November 24, 2012	Osaka	Japan	Kyocera Dome Osaka	100,000
December 5, 2012	Tokyo	Japan	Tokyo Dome	55,000
December 8, 2012	Hong Kong		AsiaWorld–Arena	35,000
December 9, 2012	Hong Kong		AsiaWorld–Arena	35,000
December 10, 2012	Hong Kong		AsiaWorld–Arena	35,000
December 14, 2012	London	England	Wembley Arena	24,000
December 15, 2012	London	England	Wembley Arena	24,000
December 22, 2012	Fukuoka	Japan	Fukuoka Dome	42,000
January 12, 2013	Osaka	Japan	Kyocera Dome Osaka	100,000
January 13, 2013	Osaka	Japan	Kyocera Dome Osaka	100,000
January 25, 2013	Seoul	South Korea	Olympic Gymnastics Arena	39,000
January 26, 2013	Seoul	South Korea	Olympic Gymnastics Arena	39,000
January 27, 2013	Seoul	South Korea	Olympic Gymnastics Arena	39,000
Total				800,000

== Box office data ==
Venue	City	Tickets sold / available	Gross revenue
Honda Center	Anaheim, California	21,914 (86%)	$2,639,019
Prudential Center	Newark, New Jersey	18,362 (88.5%)	$2,330,106
Taipei Arena	Taipei, Taiwan	20,000 (100%)	$3,622,360

== Awards ==
Awards
Year	Organization	Award	Result	Ref.
2012	Mnet Asian Music Awards	Guardian Angel Worldwide Performer	Won	

== Personnel ==
- Primary artist: BigBang
- Show director: Laurieann Gibson
- Stage design, lighting design: Leroy Bennett
- Sound: Ken Van Druten
- Visual plans, projections: Possible Productions
- Music director, keyboard: Gil Smith II
- Guitar: Justin Lyons
- Programmer: Adrian Porter
- Keys: Dante "Inferno" Jackson
- Bass: Omar Dominick
- Drums: Bennie "BrIIghtReD" Rodgers II
- Dancers: HiTech Dancers and Crazy Girls, featured break dancers
- Management: YG Entertainment
- Tour organizer: Live Nation Korea
- Tour manager: Shirley Hong
- Sponsorship: Samsung
