= The Best of Big Bang 2006–2014 =

- Digital and standard cover

Greatest hits album by BigBang
- Released: November 24, 2014
- Recorded: c. 2006 – c. 2014
- Genres: K-pop; J-pop
- Languages: Korean; Japanese
- Label: YGEX

BigBang chronology
Special Final in Dome Memorial Collection (2012)	The Best of Big Bang 2006–2014 (2014)	M (2015)

Alternative cover

The Best of Big Bang is the sixth greatest hits album by the South Korean boy band BigBang. It was released on November 26, 2014 by YGEX.

== Background ==
To celebrate BigBang's fifth anniversary since their debut in Japan and their Japan Dome Tour X in 2014, the quintet released another collection album which contains their best songs from their 2006 debut up to 2014.

== Reception ==
The Best of Big Bang 2006-2014 debuted atop the Oricon's daily albums chart with 93,226 copies sold. In the weekly chart the album amounted to 120,000 copies sold and debuted at number one. This was BigBang's highest first week sales in Japan, breaking their previous record Big Bang 2 (2011), which sold 65,000 copies. Until February 2018 its sales totaled 223,690 copies sold.

== Track listing ==
CD Disc 1
No.	Title	Lyrics	From the album	Length
1.	"My Heaven" (Japanese version)	G-Dragon, Shoko Fujibayashi, Komu	Big Bang	3:52
2.	"Gara Gara Go!!" (ガラガラ Go!!, Gotta Gotta Go!!)	BIG-RON, Shion, Ricci, YUG JAPAN	Big Bang	3:19
3.	"Baby Baby" (Last Farewell Japanese Version)	Emi K.Lynn	Big Bang	3:52
4.	"Always" (Japanese version)	Rina Moon	Big Bang	3:55
5.	"Koe o Kikasete" (声をきかせて; Let Me Hear Your Voice)	Yamamoto Narumi, Robin	Big Bang 2	4:15
6.	"Tell Me Goodbye"	Shoko Fujibayashi, Perry	Big Bang 2	4:06
7.	"Beautiful Hangover"	G-Dragon, SHIKATA, iNoZzi, Perry Borja	Big Bang 2	3:46
8.	"Hands Up" (Japanese version)	G-Dragon, T.O.P	Big Bang 2	3:59
9.	"Tonight" (Japanese version)	G-Dragon, T.O.P	Big Bang 2	3:40
10.	"Ms.Liar" (Stupid Liar JP Ver)	G-Dragon, T.O.P	Big Bang 2	3:52
11.	"Haru Haru" (Japanese version)	G-Dragon	Alive - Monster Edition	4:17
12.	"Fantastic Baby" (Japanese version)	G-Dragon, Verbal	Alive	3:53
13.	"Blue" (Japanese version)	G-Dragon	Alive	3:54
14.	"Feeling"	G-Dragon	Alive - Monster Edition	3:33
15.	"Bad Boy" (Japanese version)	G-Dragon	Alive	3:58
16.	"Ego"	G-Dragon	Alive	3:25
17.	"Monster" (Japanese version)	G-Dragon, T.O.P	Alive - Monster Edition	4:38
Total length:				66:14

CD Disc 2
No.	Title	Lyrics	From the album	Length
1.	"Oh Yeah!" (GD & TOP ft. Park Bom)	G-Dragon, T.O.P, Teddy	GD & TOP	3:17
2.	"High High" (GD & TOP)	G-Dragon, T.O.P, Teddy	GD & TOP	3:08
3.	"That XX" (G-Dragon)	G-Dragon, Teddy	One of a Kind	3:20
4.	"Crooked" (G-Dragon)	G-Dragon, Teddy	Coup d'Etat	3:45
5.	"Who You?" (G-Dragon)	G-Dragon	Coup d'Etat	3:21
6.	"Turn It Up" (T.O.P)	T.O.P	GD & TOP	3:32
7.	"Doom Dada" (T.O.P)	T.O.P	-	3:35
8.	"Eyes, Nose, Lips" (Sol)	Sol, Teddy	Rise	3:49
9.	"Ringa Linga" (Sol)	G-Dragon, Tokki	Rise	3:47
10.	"1AM" (SOL)	Teddy	Rise	3:11
11.	"Wings" (D-Lite)	G-Dragon, Daesung	Alive	3:43
12.	"Rainy Rainy" (D-Lite)	D-Lite, Amon Hayashi	D'slove	4:59
13.	"Shut Up" (D-Lite)	G-Dragon, Kenn Kato	D'slove	3:30
14.	"What Can I Do" (V.I)	V.I	V.V.I.P	3:38
15.	"Gotta Talk To U" (V.I)	V.I	Let's Talk About Love	3:35
16.	"Strong Baby" (V.I)	G-Dragon	Remember	3:43
Total length:				57:53

DVD Disc 1 - (Music videos)
No.	Title	Length
1.	"My Heaven" (Music video)
2.	"Gara Gara Go!!" (Music video)
3.	"Koe o Kikasete" (Music video)
4.	"Tell Me Goodbye" (Music video)
5.	"Beautiful Hangover" (Music video)
6.	"Tonight" (Music video - Japanese version)
7.	"Fantastic Baby" (Music video)
8.	"Blue" (Music video)
9.	"Bad Boy" (Music video)
10.	"Monster" (Music video)
11.	"Oh Yeah!" (Music video (GD&TOP ft. Bom))
12.	"Crooked" (Music video (GD))
13.	"Who You?" (Music video (GD))
14.	"Turn It Up" (Music video (TOP))
15.	"Doom Dada" (Music video (TOP))
16.	"Ringa Linga" (Music video (SOL))
17.	"1AM" (Music video (SOL))
18.	"Wings" (Music video (D-LITE))
19.	"Shut Up" (Music video (D-LITE))
20.	"Gotta Talk To U" (Music video (V.I))
21.	"Strong Baby" (Music video (V.I))
22.	"We Belong Together" (Music video (GD&TOP ft. Bom))
23.	"A Fool’s Only Tears" (Music video)
24.	"La La La" (Music video)
25.	"Dirty Cash" (Music video)
26.	"Lies" (Music video)
27.	"Always" (Music video)
28.	"Last Farewell" (Music video)
29.	"Haru Haru" (Music video)
30.	"Number 1" (Music video)
31.	"Sunset Glow" (Music video)
32.	"Lollipop" (Music video (BigBang & 2NE1))

DVD Disc 2 - (2014 A-nation performances)
No.	Title	Length
1.	"Tonight" (Live Performance)
2.	"Hands Up" (Live Performance)
3.	"Fantastic Baby" (Live Performance)
4.	"Feeling" (Live Performance)
5.	"Gara Gara Go!!" (Live Performance)
6.	"Haru Haru" (Live Performance)
7.	"Bad Boy" (Live Performance)
8.	"Let Me Hear Your Voice" (Live Performance)
9.	"My Heaven" (Live Performance)
10.	"Fantastic Baby (Encore)" (Live Performance)

== Charts ==
=== Weekly charts ===
Weekly chart performance for The Best of Big Bang 2006–2014
Chart (2014)	Peak position	Debut sales
Japanese Hot Albums (Billboard)	25	—N/a
Japanese Top Albums Sales (Billboard)	1	—N/a
Japanese Daily Albums (Oricon)	1	93,226
Japanese Weekly Albums (Oricon)	1	146,582
Japanese Digital Sales (Oricon)	25	2,039

=== Year-end charts ===
Year-end chart performance for The Best of Big Bang 2006–2014
Chart	Year	Position	Sales
Oricon Year end Albums	2014	32	133,501
Oricon Year end Albums	2015	85	53,978

== Release history ==
Release history and formats for The Best of Big Bang 2006–2014
Region	Date	Format	Label
Japan	November 24, 2014	CD; CD+DVD; digital download	YGEX
