= Blue (BigBang song) =

2012 single by Big Bang

Single by BigBang

from the EP Alive
- Language: Korean
- Released: February 22, 2012
- Studio: YG (Seoul)
- Genre: R&B; dance
- Length: 3:53
- Label: YG
- Songwriters: G-Dragon; Teddy; T.O.P
- Producers: Teddy; G-Dragon

BigBang singles chronology
"Love Song" (2011)	"Blue" (2012)	"Bad Boy" (2012)

Music video
- "Blue" on YouTube

"Blue" (Korean: 블루; RR: Beullu) is a song recorded by South Korean boy group BigBang for their fifth Korean-language extended play (EP), Alive (2012). It was made available for digital download and streaming as the EP's first single on February 22, 2012, by YG Entertainment. The song was written and composed by G-Dragon along with Teddy Park, with additional rap parts penned by T.O.P. Stylistically, the track conveys the emotions of feeling blue—akin to its title—after letting go of a romantic relationship, and showcases a more emotional and vulnerable side of BigBang while at the same time providing a comforting undertone.

"Blue" received generally positive reviews from music critics, many of whom complimented its fresh musical style and composition. It was named the Song of the Month for March at the Cyworld Digital Music Awards and at the Gaon Chart K-pop Awards due to its success on digital platforms. Having debuted at number-one on both the Gaon Digital Chart and the K-pop Hot 100 chart, "Blue" went on to sell more than 3.3 million digital units by the end of the year and was ranked as the fourth best-selling single of 2012 in South Korea.

The music video for "Blue", filmed in New York City, was uploaded in conjunction with the single's release. To promote the track, BigBang appeared on several music programs in South Korea and further included it in the setlist for their Alive Galaxy Tour (2012).

== Background and composition ==
YG Entertainment released a partial tracklist from BigBang's then-unnamed upcoming album on January 27, 2012—"Blue" was one of two titles revealed. On February 7, YG confirmed that the group's fifth Korean-language extended play Alive would be released on February 29. The label also announced the subsequent start of the group's first worldwide concert tour, Alive Galaxy Tour, on March 2, 2012, at the Olympic Gymnastics Arena in Seoul. On February 16, the full tracklist was published, with "Blue" highlighted as one of the EP's lead singles. Further information released the following day, detailed that the song would be an emotional track that showcased the honest feelings of the band members. Slated for a midnight release (local time) on February 22, the song was made available for digital consumption as the first single from Alive.

"Blue" – BigBang
A 23-second sample of "Blue", which is described as an emotional number which showcases the members' honest feelings following a breakup with their lovers.

The release of "Blue" marked BigBang's first single in almost a year. A Japanese version of the track was recorded and included on the group's fourth Japanese studio album of the same name, which was released on March 28, 2012. "Blue" was also included on BigBang's sixth greatest hits album, The Best of Big Bang 2006-2014, released by YGEX in November 2014.

The song was written and produced by BigBang member G-Dragon and Teddy Park, with additional lyrics penned by member T.O.P. Yim Hyun-su of The Korea Herald described the track as possessing a "crispy sound that reminds you of the cold and fresh air early in the morning." Written in the standard time of 4/4, the song is composed in the key signature of G major and carries an average tempo 125 beats per minute. The title "Blue" serves as a representation of the emotions conveyed though the song, which consists the sadness and grief one experiences following their separation from a lover. Deemed a stylistic shift from previous releases, the song embraces a more emotional side of the group seldom exposed to the public, and highlights their mature vocals. In an article posted on YG Life at the time of the track's release, the group stated that the song expresses the feelings of longing, emptiness, and sadness. "It is a song where painful things turn blue", while also providing "a warm feeling of being comforted".

== Critical reception ==
"Blue" primarily received positive reviews from music critics, many of whom commented on its fresh musical style. The Borneo Post review described the song as a throwback recipe "with hints of modernism," calling it a "therapeutic confession." Kaitlin Miller of the Chicago Sun-Times included "Blue" in their 2016 list of best BigBang songs from the past ten years; she wrote that Alive contained "a more mature sound that included more interesting electronic samples and production techniques", which were present in the "smooth [and] emotional track". In an album review for Alive, Fuse TV contrasted the track along with "Bad Boy" to the heavily electronica-inspired "Fantastic Baby", calling both songs "clean [and] clutter-free" and made "Alive one of BigBang's most well-rounded releases to date." Owen Meyers of Popjustice praised the track's musical composition and ranked it second on their list of 2012's best K-pop singles, writing that despite its toned down elements, "it subtly morphs and builds into a non-boring slowburn anthem, punctuated by G‑Dragon's occasional croon 'I'm singing my blu-oo-ooos.'" In December 2019, Caitlin Kelley of Billboard referred to "Blue" as one of BigBang's career defining hits and called the song "their smoothest R&B concoction to date."

== Awards ==
BigBang received the Song of the Month award at the Cyworld Digital Music Awards for "Blue" due to its success on digital platforms in South Korea. The group additionally won the same award at the 2nd Gaon Chart K-Pop Awards on February 13, 2013. "Blue" ranked first place on various weekly South Korean music programs during the course of its promotion, collecting a total of six awards, and achieved a Triple Crown on Inkigayo.

Awards for "Blue"
Year	Organization	Award	Result	Ref.
2012	Cyworld Digital Music Awards	Song of the Month (February)	Won	
2013	Gaon Chart K-Pop Awards	Song of the Month (February)	Won	

Music program awards for "Blue"
Program	Date	Ref.
M Countdown	March 8, 2012	
Music on Top	March 14, 2012	
Music Bank	March 9, 2012	
Music Bank	March 16, 2012	
Inkigayo	March 11, 2012	
Inkigayo	March 18, 2012	
Inkigayo	March 25, 2012	

== Commercial performance ==
Commercially, "Blue" experienced success in South Korea. In the week ending on February 25, 2012, the song entered South Korea's Gaon Digital Chart at number one, where it remained for three consecutive weeks. In its opening week, the single garnered 833,233 units in digital sales and ranked at number one on the component Download Chart. It sold an additional 537,161 and 348,535 digital units in its second and third weeks, respectively. Despite being released in the last week of February, "Blue" became the best-selling and best-performing song overall of the month. It also debuted at number one on the component Streaming Chart, with over 2.1 million audio streams, where it remained for four consecutive weeks, and became the most-streamed single of March. By the end of 2012, "Blue" had accumulated 3,365,275 digital downloads and 24,040,039 units in digital streams to rank as the fourth best-selling song, and the tenth best-performing single overall when factoring in digitals, streams, and downloads. "Blue" debuted atop the Billboard K-pop Hot 100, and spent three consecutive weeks at number one. It peaked at number three on the US World Digital Songs chart for the week of March 10, 2012, becoming the group's second top-three entry on the international ranking. On the chart's year-end issue, "Blue" ranked as the 21st most-downloaded song in the US in the world music genre. The song accumulated over 3.56 million digital downloads in South Korea by 2015.

== Music video and promotion ==
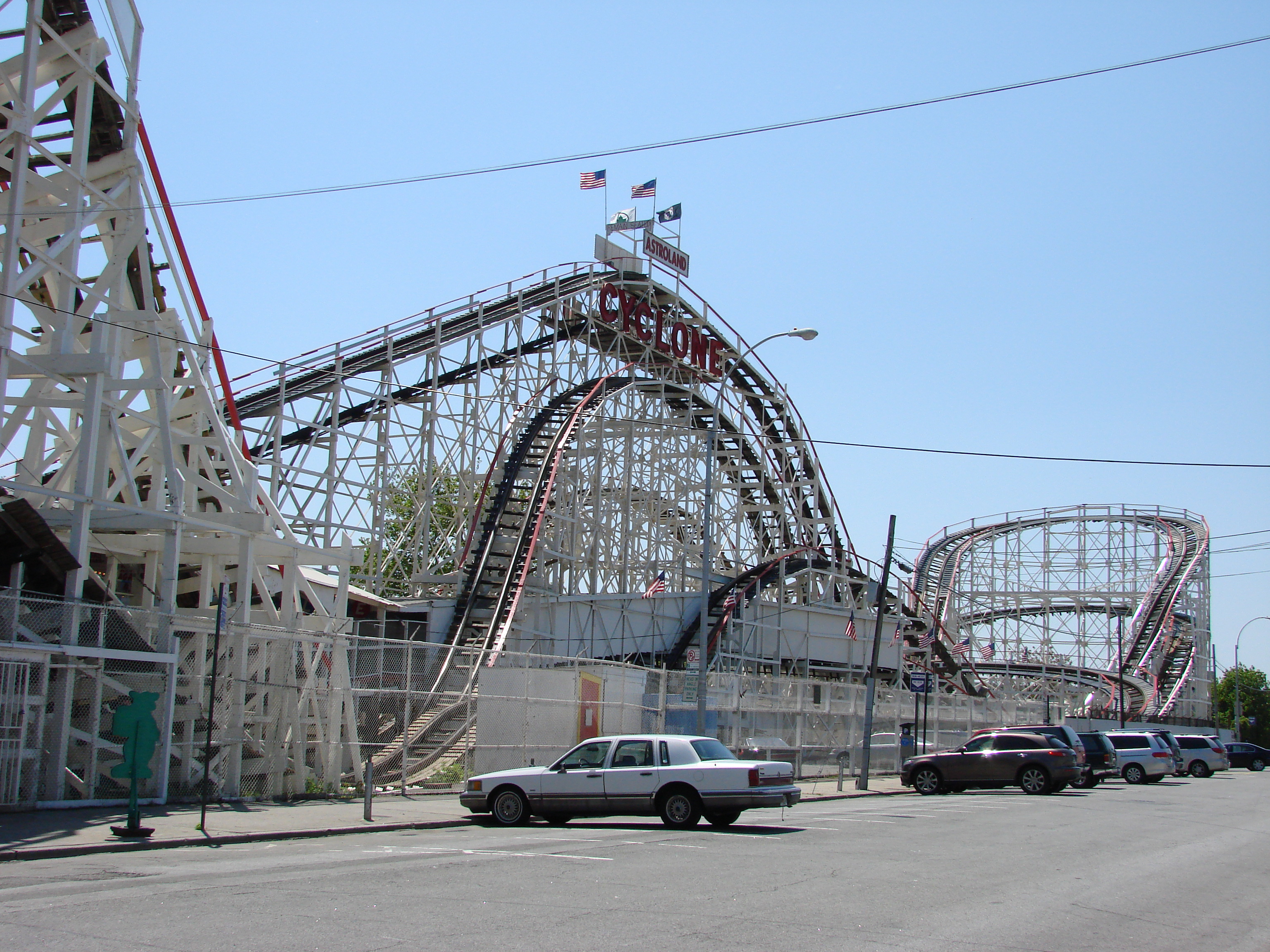
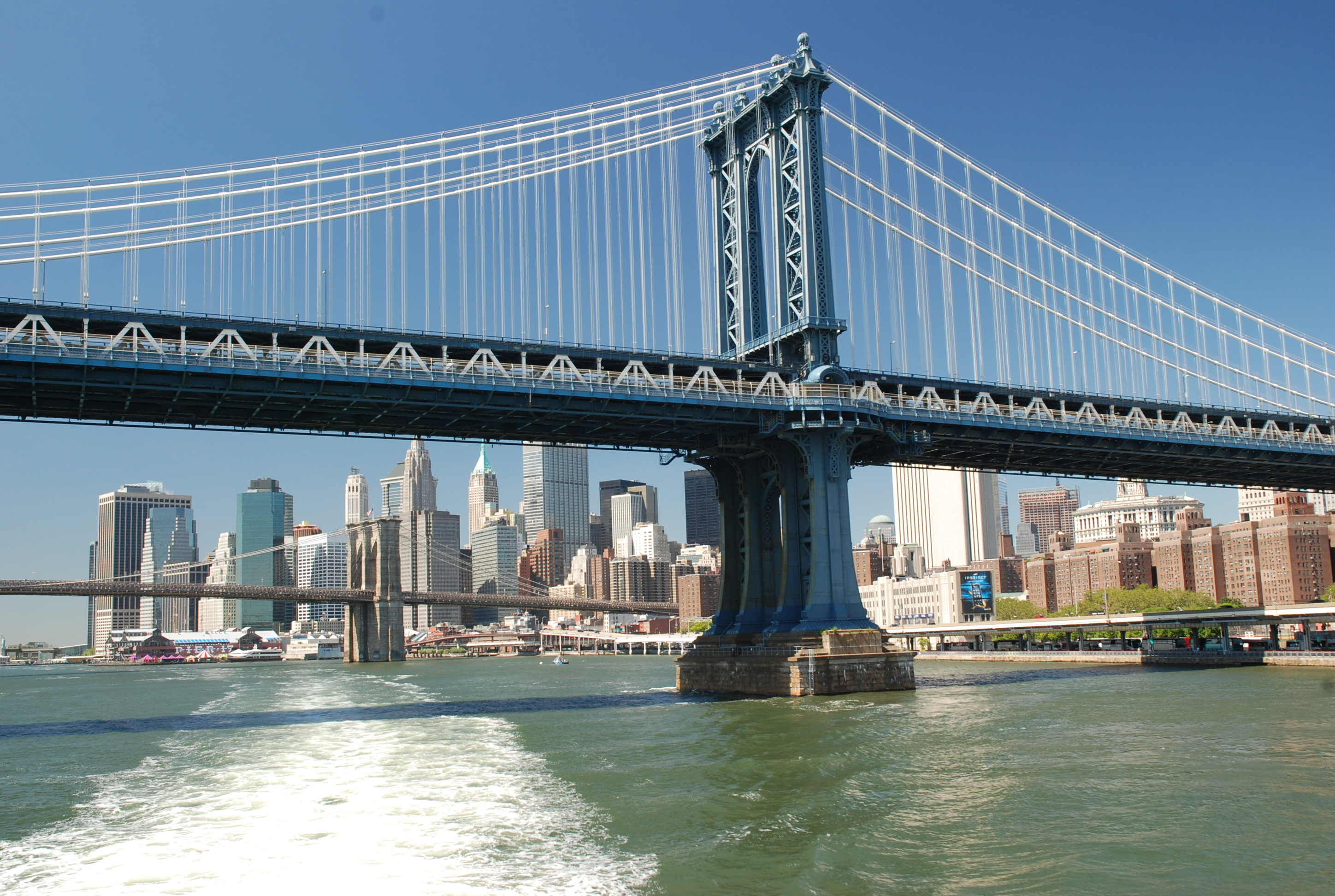
Filmed in Brooklyn, the music video features scenes shot next to the Coney Island Cyclone (left) and Manhattan Bridge (right) in order to convey an "old" and "drudge-like" feel.

The music video for "Blue" was uploaded to BigBang's official YouTube channel in conjunction with the single's release. Filmed in Brooklyn, New York City, the video was directed by Han Sa-min, who had previously collaborated with the group for the music video for "Love Song" a year prior. In an exclusive interview, video producer Justin Noto commented that the group was "interested in a look that seemed like the drudges of New York, the old 1970s feel." However, Noto added that "the city has been cleaned up a lot since it was like that. So it was a challenge to find places with that iconic, rundown Brooklyn type of feel."

The production crew eventually selected the Coney Island Cyclone, a wooden roller coaster at Luna Park, as one of the filming locations for the desaturated visual, where they utilized long dolly shots in order to depict the band members running down a street along the Cyclone. Additionally, several scenes were filmed in an industrial section of Brooklyn and on a rooftop of a warehouse in DUMBO, where it incorporated views of the busy Manhattan Bridge in the background in order to convey a drudge-like urban atmosphere.

An instant hit on YouTube, the music video received over eight million views in five days following its release, and ranked as one of the top trending videos on the platform. To promote the single, BigBang performed the song on the South Korean music programs SBS's Inkigayo and Mnet's M Countdown throughout the month of March. The group made their comeback stage on Inkigayo on March 11, 2012, and performed "Blue" live for the first time alongside the EP's other singles "Fantastic Baby" and "Bad Boy". In order to promote the EP internationally, BigBang kicked off their first worldwide concert tour, the Alive Galaxy Tour, at the Olympic Gymnastics Arena in Seoul, shortly after the EP's release, on March 2 to 4. The tour was officially sponsored by Samsung Galaxy and promoted a setlist including the track "Blue". It saw 48 shows across various cities in Asia, North America, South America and Europe, and concluded in January 2013.

== Track listing ==
- Digital download / streaming
1. "Blue" – 3:53

== Charts ==
=== Weekly charts ===
2012 weekly chart performance for "Blue"
Chart (2012)	Peak position
South Korea (Gaon)	1
South Korea (K-pop Hot 100)	1
US World Digital Songs (Billboard)	3

2026 weekly chart performance for "Blue"
Chart (2026)	Peak position
Singapore Regional (RIAS)	8
Vietnam Hot 100 (Billboard)	85

=== Monthly charts ===
Monthly chart performance for "Blue"
Chart (2012)	Peak position
South Korea (Gaon)	1

=== Year-end charts ===
Year-end chart positions for "Blue"
Chart (2012)	Position
South Korea (Gaon)	10
South Korea (K-pop Hot 100)	11
US World Digital Songs (Billboard)	21

== Release history ==
Release history and formats for "Blue"
Region	Date	Format	Label	Ref.
Various	February 22, 2012	Digital download; streaming	YG Entertainment	
