= Alive (BigBang EP) =

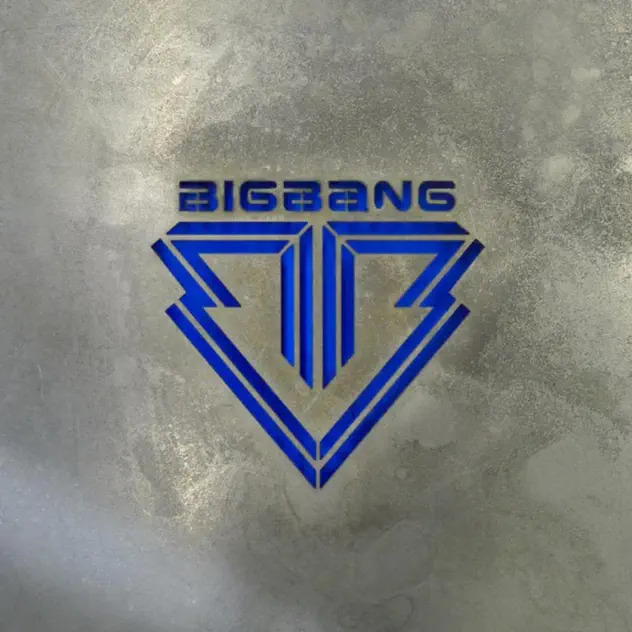

EP by BigBang
- Released: February 29, 2012
- Recorded: 2011–2012
- Studio: YG Studios (Seoul)
- Genre: K-pop; dance-pop; electropop; hip hop; EDM
- Length: 23:41
- Language: Korean
- Label: YG; KMP Holdings
- Producer: G-Dragon; Teddy Park; Future Bounce

BigBang chronology
Big Bang 2 (2011)	Alive (2012)	Alive (album) (2012)

Singles from Alive
- 1. "Blue" Released: February 22, 2012; 2. "Bad Boy" Released: February 29, 2012; 3. "Fantastic Baby" Released: February 29, 2012

Special Edition 'Still Alive'

Singles from Still Alive
- 1. "Monster" Released: June 3, 2012

Alive is the fifth Korean extended play by South Korean boy group BigBang, released through YG Entertainment on February 29, 2012. Musically, it is a dance and electronic record that incorporates elements of hip hop and R&B. BigBang members G-Dragon and T.O.P wrote and produced the lyrics and music for nearly all tracks on the album. Alive spawned three digital singles that were released within the week prior—"Blue", "Fantastic Baby", and "Bad Boy", all three of which peaked within the top three positions on the Gaon Digital Chart.

Music critics praised the record's production and composition and was named one of the year's 40 best albums by Fuse. The EP along with its singles won various awards, including at the Gaon Chart Music Awards and World Music Awards. A repackaged version of the extended titled Still Alive was released on June 3, 2012, and featured the single "Monster" along with two new additional tracks.

Both versions achieved commercial success in South Korea, with Alive and Still Alive ranking as the 2nd and 6th best-selling albums of 2012 in South Korea; it sold a combined total of over 450,000 copies by 2016. Internationally, Alive marked the first time a Korean-language album entered the Billboard 200 in the United States, and the second time a Korean artist entered the chart after BoA in 2009.

== Release and promotion ==
On January 27, 2012, the track listing and title of BigBang's upcoming EP, Alive were announced. Teddy Park of YG Entertainment and BigBang member G-Dragon produced the majority of the music for the EP with the help of other producers such as DJ Murf and Peejay. G-Dragon also wrote the majority of the songs on the EP with the help of T.O.P. and Teddy Park.

"Blue" was released on February 22, 2012, as the EP's lead single, and thereafter BigBang released previews of other tracks on YouTube every day from February 23–28. They also announced the Alive World Tour in support of the album. The EP and its second single, "Bad Boy", were released simultaneously on February 29, 2012. Promotions began with televised performances from the EP on SBS's Inkigayo. "Fantastic Baby" was the third single with its music video released on March 7, 2012.

The EP was repackaged as a special edition with additional songs and re-titled as Still Alive. The special edition and its single "Monster" were released June 3, 2012. "Blue", "Bad Boy", "Fantastic Baby", and "Monster" were also re-recorded with Japanese lyrics and included on BigBang's full-length Japanese album, Alive. Other tracks, in their original Korean-language form, were also included on the album.

== Critical reception ==
Alive garnered positive reviews from music critics, being hailed as "trendsetting". Fuse named Alive one of the best albums of the year, the only non-English album on the list, writing that the record "blurs the lines between traditional K-pop, dance pop, R&B and just about every other genre", and calling it "one of BigBang's most well-rounded releases to date." Billboard called the EP and its repackage "objectively one of the group’s best eras", and noted how "each song is iconic in its own way". Chicago Sun-Times noted that Alive included a more mature sound and "more interesting production techniques", and that it displayed BigBang's diversity. The Fader praised Alive for making "the most compelling case yet" for a rising K-pop act in the west. The Borneo Post declared that "Alive is a humble manifesto that declares BigBang's efforts to grow into Kpop legends who live in the now. They've certainly proven before that they're a cut above the usual" and stated "this album is everywhere, and everyone-friendly."

== Commercial performance ==
Alive became the first Korean album or EP to chart on the United States' Billboard 200 and at its time of release, held the record for being the best selling K-pop album ever in the United States, selling over 4,100 copies in its first week of release. It also charted at number four on the Billboard Heatseekers Albums chart, at number twenty-two on the Independent Albums chart, and number four on the World Albums chart. On March 9, 2012, it was revealed that BigBang was the first act to occupy 5 out of the top 10 spots on Billboard's K-pop Hot 100 with "Blue", "Bad Boy", "Fantastic Baby", "Ain't No Fun", and "Love Dust".

Alive reached number six on Japan's domestic Oricon weekly album chart as a Korean import. In South Korea, both Alive and Still Alive debuted at number one on the Gaon Album Chart. The EP finished 2012 as the second best-selling album of the year in South Korea, while the repackage was the sixth. In Taiwan, the EP reached the number-one spot on G-Music chart and managed to be certified double platinum.

== Accolades ==
In December 2019, Billboard ranked Alive number 22 on their list of The 25 Greatest K-Pop Albums of the 2010s; Caitlin Kelley praised the record's musical craftsmanship and wrote that it represented "the moment when Big Bang crossed the threshold from above-average hitmakers to full-fledged icons."

Awards and nominations for Alive
Year	Organization	Category	Result	Ref.
2012	Melon Music Awards	Album of the Year	Nominated	
2012	Mnet Asian Music Awards	Album of the Year	Nominated	
2012	Singapore E-Awards	Double Platinum Awards	Won	
2013	Gaon Chart Music Awards	Album of the Year – 1st Quarter	Won	
2013	Japan Gold Disc Award	Best 3 Albums (Asian)	Won	

== Track listing ==
Alive — Standard edition
No.	Title	Lyrics	Music	Arrangement	Length
1.	"Intro (Alive)"	G-Dragon, Teddy, T.O.P	Dee.P, G-Dragon, Teddy	Dee.P	0:48
2.	"Blue"	G-Dragon, Teddy, T.O.P	Teddy, G-Dragon	Teddy	3:53
3.	"Love Dust" (사랑먼지; Sarangmeonji)	G-Dragon, Teddy, T.O.P	G-Dragon, Teddy	Teddy	3:52
4.	"Bad Boy"	G-Dragon, T.O.P	G-Dragon, Choice37	Choice37	3:57
5.	"Ain't No Fun" (재미없어; Jaemieobseo)	G-Dragon, T.O.P	G-Dragon, D.J Murf, Peejay	D.J Murf, Peejay	3:42
6.	"Fantastic Baby"	G-Dragon, T.O.P, Teddy	G-Dragon, Teddy	G-Dragon, Teddy	3:51
7.	"Wings" (날개; Nalgae; Daesung solo)	G-Dragon, Daesung	G-Dragon, P.K	P.K, Dee.P	3:43
Total length:					23:41

Big Bang Special Edition: Still Alive — Repackage
No.	Title	Lyrics	Music	Arrangement	Length
1.	"Still Alive"	G-Dragon, Teddy, T.O.P	Dee.P, G-Dragon, Teddy	Dee.P	3:18
2.	"Monster"	G-Dragon, T.O.P	G-Dragon, P.K	P.K, Dee.P	3:51
3.	"Feeling" (Korean version)	G-Dragon, T.O.P	Boys Noize, G-Dragon, T.O.P	Boys Noize	3:35
4.	"Fantastic Baby"	G-Dragon, T.O.P	G-Dragon, Teddy	G-Dragon, Teddy	3:52
5.	"Bad Boy"	G-Dragon, T.O.P	G-Dragon, Choice37	Choice37	3:58
6.	"Blue"	G-Dragon, Teddy, T.O.P	Teddy, G-Dragon	Teddy	3:55
7.	"Bingle Bingle" (빙글빙글; Binggeul Binggeul)	G-Dragon, T.O.P	Teddy, G-Dragon, Seo Won-jin	Teddy, Seo Won-jin	3:00
8.	"Ego" (Korean version)	G-Dragon, T.O.P	G-Dragon, Ham Seung-cheon, Kang Uk-jin	Ham Seung-cheon, Kang Uk-jin	3:25
9.	"Love Dust" (사랑먼지; Sarangmeonji)	G-Dragon, Teddy, T.O.P	G-Dragon, Teddy	Teddy	3:51
Total length:					32:45

Still Alive — Taiwanese edition DVD (bonus tracks)
No.	Title	Director	Length
1.	"Monster" (Music Video with Chinese Subtitles)	Han Sa-min
2.	"Blue" (Music Video with Chinese Subtitles)	Han Sa-min
3.	"Bad Boy" (Music Video with Chinese Subtitles)	Han Sa-min
4.	"Fantastic Baby" (Music Video with Chinese Subtitles)	Seo Hyun-seung

== Charts ==
=== Weekly charts ===
Weekly chart performance for Alive
Chart (2012)	Peak chart positions	
Chart (2012)	Alive	Still Alive
Japanese Albums (Oricon)	6	—
South Korean Albums (Gaon)	1	1
Taiwanese Albums (G-Music)	1	2
US Billboard 200	150	—
US Heatseekers Albums (Billboard)	4	20
US Independent Albums (Billboard)	22	—
US World Albums (Billboard)	4	3

=== Monthly charts ===
Monthly chart performance for Alive
Chart (2012)	Peak positions	
Chart (2012)	Alive	Still Alive
Japanese Albums (Oricon)	33	—
South Korean Albums (Gaon)	1	1

=== Year-end charts ===
Year-end chart performance for Alive
Chart (2012)	Position	
Chart (2012)	Alive	Still Alive
South Korean Albums (Gaon)	2	6
Chart (2013)	Position	
South Korean Albums (Gaon)	—	90

== Sales ==
Sales for Alive
Region	Sales amount
South Korea	283,507
South Korea (Still Alive)	176,627
United States	4,000

== Release history ==
Release history and formats for Alive
Region	Date	Edition(s)	Format(s)	Label(s)
Various	February 29, 2012	Alive	Digital download; streaming	YG
South Korea	February 29, 2012	Alive	CD; digital download; streaming	YG; KMP Holdings
Taiwan	March 27, 2012	Alive	CD	Warner Music Taiwan
Various	June 3, 2012	Still Alive	Digital download; streaming	YG
South Korea	June 3, 2012	Still Alive	Digital download; streaming	YG
South Korea	June 6, 2012	Still Alive	CD	YG; KMP Holdings
Taiwan	June 29, 2012	Still Alive	CD; CD+DVD	Warner Music Taiwan
