= Fantastic Baby =

2012 single by BigBang

Single by BigBang

from the EP Alive
- Language: Korean
- Released: February 29, 2012
- Studio: YG (Seoul)
- Genre: EDM; dance-pop
- Length: 3:51
- Label: YG
- Songwriters: G-Dragon; T.O.P; Teddy
- Producers: G-Dragon; Teddy

BigBang singles chronology
"Bad Boy" (2012)	"Fantastic Baby" (2012)	"Monster" (2012)

Music video
- "Fantastic Baby" on YouTube

"Fantastic Baby" is a song recorded by South Korean boy band BigBang. It was released as a single for digital download and streaming by YG Entertainment on February 29, 2012, in conjunction with the release of the band's fourth extended play (EP), Alive (2012). The song was written by members T.O.P, G-Dragon and long-time group collaborator Teddy Park, whilst production and composition was handled by the latter two contributors. A boisterous, sonic and dynamic EDM track, "Fantastic Baby" incorporates a multitude of hooks and catchphrases—most notably "Wow, fantastic baby" and "boom shakalaka".

"Fantastic Baby" was well received by music critics, with Rolling Stone and Billboard magazines naming it one of the greatest boy band songs of all-time. The song has also been recognized by Billboard as "one of the biggest K-pop hits ever", and was hailed as a highlight in the spread of the Korean wave around the world by The Smithsonian in 2013. The song was a commercial success, peaking at number three on both the Gaon Digital Chart and the Billboard World Digital Songs chart while placing within the top 10 on the Billboard Japan Hot 100.

Selling more than 4 million digital units in the band's native country by 2016, "Fantastic Baby" became one of the best-selling singles in South Korea. Additionally, the song sold 3 million units across China and Japan, and was certified double platinum by the Recording Industry Association of Japan (RIAJ) in August 2015. The accompanying music video, directed by Seo Hyun-seung, was released on March 7, 2012 and became the first music video by a K-pop group to surpass 200 and 300 million views on YouTube.

== Background and release ==
On January 25, 2012, YG Entertainment unveiled a teaser photo on their blog YG Life with the word "Alive", sparking curiosity among fans. Two days later, the first two tracks of their then-upcoming release were exhibited, and were followed by additional teasers revealing the rest of the tracklist in increments, revealing an extended play. On February 7, the agency officially confirmed that BigBang would release their fifth Korean-language extended play, titled Alive, on February 29. In addition, it was announced that the group would embark on their first worldwide concert tour, given the title "Alive Tour 2012" in Seoul from March 2 to 4, 2012, and would see shows in several different continents around the world. On February 16, it was revealed that "Fantastic Baby" would serve as one of the title tracks for the EP. On February 29, 2012, the song was officially released for digital download and streaming in conjunction with the release of Alive. It was written and produced by both member G-Dragon and YG Entertainment collaborator Teddy Park, with additional rap lyrics written by member T.O.P. A Japanese-language version was released as part of the band's fourth Japanese studio album of the same name on March 28, 2012 through YGEX, with the lyrics translated by M-Flo member Verbal. It was later added to the band's Japanese greatest hits album The Best of Big Bang 2006–2014 in November 2014.

== Music and lyrics ==
"Fantastic Baby"
A 21-second sample of "Fantastic Baby", which has been described as an anarchic, sonic, and vibrant EDM, hip hop, electropop, and hip house track, complete with a multitude of catchphrases—"Wow, fantastic baby", "I wanna da-da-da-da-dance", and "boom shakalaka".

Musically, "Fantastic Baby" has been described as an EDM track that features a "boisterous" and "genre-blending sound". The International Business Times referred to the song's composition as a "beautiful blend of electropop and EDM-laced with an anarchistic theme." Composed in the key of D minor, the song carries a tempo of 130 beats per minute, and has a runtime of 3:52. "Fantastic Baby" incorporates "bright digital thumps and soaring synth wails" with infectious hooks such as "Wow, fantastic baby", "I wanna da-da-da-da-dance" and "boom shakalaka" to create a vibrant, sonic and dynamic electronic and hip hop track. Tamar Herman of Billboard magazine contrasted the song's musicality from much of the band's previous works, which consisted of mainly old-school R&B and hip-hop hits which have gradually evolved into more sentimental numbers and upbeat dance tunes, and referred to "Fantastic Baby" as a "new era that poised the group as one of Korea’s most ambitious acts". NME compared the song's signature catchphrase "boom shakalaka" to music that of 1960s band Sly and the Family Stone.

== Critical reception ==
The song was met with general acclaim from music critics. Kaitlin Miller from the Chicago Sun-Times called the track one of BigBang's best songs, hailing it a "quintessential K-pop song" for being able to reach a widespread international audience. Writing about the influence of "Fantastic Baby", Tamar Herman from Billboard magazine recognized the track as the first to cross international boundaries with its "then-groundbreaking EDM style", and noted its exhilarating and creative flair; Herman also praised the song for being "nothing short of fantastic." The publication also ranked "Fantastic Baby" number 27 on their 100 Greatest Boy Band Songs of All Time list, stating that the "anarchic hip-house track raised the bar for the genre, overflowing with vibrancy as it bounces between sonic styles."

Rolling Stone ranked "Fantastic Baby" number 31 in their list of 75 Greatest Boy Band Songs of All Time, writing: "This instantly accessible single from K-pop phenomenon BigBang blew off many doors of American crossover with little effort on the band's part." The publication further labeled the song as a "modern-day essential" for showcasing "K-pop's genre-bending, visually-oriented charms." In October 2013, Smithsonian Music recognized "Fantastic Baby" as one of the highlights in the spread of the Korean Wave around the world, along with "Sorry, Sorry" by Super Junior, "Gangnam Style" by Psy, and "I Am the Best" by 2NE1, among others. In Melon and newspaper Seoul Shinmun's list of top 100 K-pop songs of all time, 35 Korean music critics and industry experts ranked "Fantastic Baby" at number 24, with KBS Radio director Soyeon Kang stating that the "unconventional fashion, intense music video, and a hot theme of breaking the mold" conveyed freedom of expression and divergence from the basic beliefs of society, while at the same time keeping its "musical attractiveness". Kang added that the song served as "a kind of turning point in the history of BigBang and K-pop": "Both the music and philosophy of the song were ahead of their time".

"Fantastic Baby" on select critic lists
Publication	Year	List	Rank	Ref.
Billboard	2018	The 100 Greatest Boy Band Songs of All Time	27	
Billboard	2019	The 100 Greatest K-pop Songs of the 2010s	65	
Billboard	2019	The 100 Greatest Music Videos of the 2010s	46	
The Dong-a Ilbo	2016	Top Male Idol Songs of the Past 20 Years	6	
The Guardian	2012	The 2012 pop video awards	No order	
Globe Telecom	2020	Iconic K-pop Music Videos	No order	
The Korea Herald	2020	BigBang's top 50 tracks, ranked	1	
Melon	2021	Top 100 K-pop Songs of All Time	24	
Rolling Stone	2020	75 Greatest Boy Band Songs of All Time	31	
Spin	2012	Top 20 K-pop Singles of 2012	13	

== Awards ==
"Fantastic Baby" was nominated for multiple awards, including Song of the Year at the 2012 Melon Music Awards, but lost to "Gangnam Style" by labelmate Psy. It was later named Song of the Month (March) at both the 2nd Gaon Chart K-Pop Awards and 2012 Cyworld Digital Music Awards; additionally, it was one of the 12 songs to receive the Digital Bonsang award at the 22nd Seoul Music Awards. "Fantastic Baby" also collected two music program wins on Mnet's M Countdown during the course of its promotion, one on March 15 and another on March 22, 2012.

Awards and nominations for "Fantastic Baby"
Year	Organization	Award	Result	Ref.
2012	Cyworld Digital Music Awards	Song of the Month – March	Won	
2012	Gaon Chart K-Pop Awards	Song of the Year – March	Won	
2012	Melon Music Awards	Song of the Year	Nominated	
2012	Melon Music Awards	Popular Netizen Song	Nominated	
2013	Golden Disc Awards	Digital Bonsang	Won	
2013	Golden Disc Awards	Digital Daesang	Nominated	
2013	MTV Video Music Awards Japan	Best Dance Video	Won	
2013	RTHK International Pop Poll Awards	Top Ten International Gold Songs	Won	
2014	World Music Awards	Best Video of the Year	Won	

== Commercial performance ==
Four days after the EP's release, the song debuted at number four in the Gaon Digital Chart, charting behind BigBang's other songs "Blue," "Bad Boy", and "Love Dust", and sold 450,021 digital units. The following week, the song rose to number three, selling an additional 362,298 copies. The song was subsequently ranked as the second best-selling song of March 2012 in South Korea, reaching 1,229,518 downloads, and ranked number one on the monthly digital chart. On the Billboard K-pop Hot 100, the song entered at number five in the chart issue dated March 17, 2012. The following week, the song rose to its peak of number two, and charted for 17 additional weeks. By the end of the year, "Fantastic Baby" was ranked as the fifth best-selling and sixth most streamed single of 2012 in South Korea, with 3,339,871 digital units sold and over 30 million streams. As of September 2016, "Fantastic Baby" had accumulated over 4 million digital downloads in the country, becoming the best-selling boy group song on Gaon Music Chart.

In Japan, the single was certified gold by the Recording Industry Association of Japan (RIAJ) for PC downloads in September 2012. In December 2013, the song was certified platinum—having sold more than 250,000 units—and was further certified double platinum by the RIAJ in Japan for total digital sales of over 500,000 units in August 2015. The single went on to peak at number 8 on the Billboard Japan Hot 100 in the week of February 19, 2016, after spending over 75 weeks on the chart. Elsewhere, in China, the single sold over 2.5 million digital units on Chinese music streaming and download service KuGou. In the United States, the song peaked at number three on the Billboard World Digital Song Sales chart in the week of March 23, 2012. On its year-end issue for 2012, "Fantastic Baby" was ranked the sixth best-selling international/foreign language song in the US, and was further ranked number 11 and number 24 on the 2013 and 2014 year-end issues, respectively. As of February 2021, "Fantastic Baby" is the third-longest charting K-pop song on the World Digital Song Sales–following Psy's "Gangnam Style" (2012) and "Dope" (2015) by BTS–spending over 130 weeks on the chart.

== Music video ==
=== Production and synopsis ===
A still from the music video, displaying the five members being crowned kings upon thrones.

The music video for "Fantastic Baby" was uploaded to BigBang's official YouTube channel on March 7, 2012, and was directed by Seo Hyun-seung. The video was described as a "visual stunner", and captures the fight for freedom from oppression. The members are seen wearing futuristic helmets, metal shoulder embellishments and jewelled crowns, among other accessories, while sporting dark make-up. The background dancers act as "rebels colliding with oppressors", wearing masks, spraying wires and waves of smoke around sets containing wreckage, while dancing saja-nori (the Korean lion dance). BigBang released a Japanese version of the music video focused on the band's scenes while they are in a warehouse setting. Some individual scenes were removed and there are no extras in this version.

The music video begins with scenes depicting a revolution, with the black-masked people representing those who capitalized on past controversies and tried to discourage, discredit and ultimately disband BigBang, whereas the white-masked people symbolize the V.I.P.s, the band's fans, who continue to defend and protect them despite everything. In the video, three frames of T.O.P. wearing a variety of outfits reminiscent of historical revolutionary figures such as George Washington and Napoleon Bonaparte are featured, which serves to represent BigBang's status as K-pop's musical revolutionaries. Daesung is also shown to be bound in chains, representing the emotional turmoil he went through following a car accident that he was involved in a year prior. The images of a frozen Taeyang, a scarred Seungri, and a seemingly silenced G-Dragon, portray the number of publicity blows the members have faced in the past year. The video concludes with a giant dance party and the five members being crowned kings upon thrones.

=== Reception ===
Kevin Perry from NME compared the band members' outfits in the music video to those of Lady Gaga. While commenting on the success of labelmate Psy's "Gangnam Style", the staff of The Daily Telegraph recommended "Fantastic Baby" to its readers, highlighting the video's "fashionista eccentricity and excess." Francois Marchand from The Vancouver Sun felt that "it is easily one of the most colourfully twisted pop videos we've seen in a while, combining RPG style art, riot gear, steampunk elements and street pop swagger." Tamar Herman of Billboard praised the video's "stimulating visual feast" when "promoting music as a form of rebellion." The Guardian named "Fantastic Baby" the best K-pop music video of 2012, with Peter Robinson asserting that the "supremely demented" video "establishes global equilibrium." The music video for "Fantastic Baby" won Best Dance Video at the 2013 MTV Video Music Awards Japan and won the Video of the Year award at the 2014 World Music Awards.

In March 2014, the official music video for "Fantastic Baby" on YouTube surpassed 100 million views, making it the fourth Korean video to do so, after Psy's "Gangnam Style" (2012), "Gentleman" (2013), and Girls' Generation's "Gee" (2009), as well as the first by a Korean boy band. The music video later became the first from a K-pop group to reach 200 million and 300 million views on the platform in January 2016 and June 2017, respectively. The music video then become their first to hit 400 million in June 2019. It became their second music video to hit 500 million in January 2022.

== Live performances ==
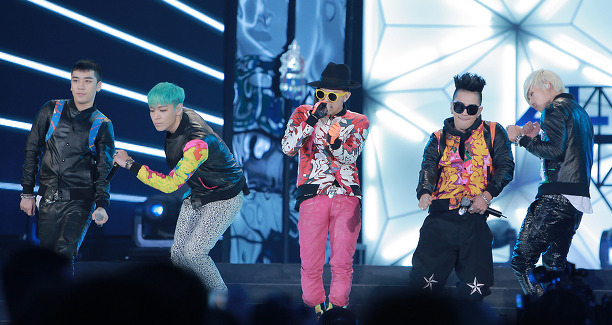
BigBang at the K-Collection in Seoul on March 11, 2012.

BigBang premiered "Fantastic Baby" at the Olympic Gymnastics Arena in Seoul on March 2, 2012, which served as the group's first show on their worldwide tour, Alive Galaxy Tour. They performed the song on live television for the first time on March 11 on Inkigayo, alongside "Blue" and "Bad Boy". Additionally, they made an appearance at the K-Collection in Seoul on the same day. A live shot from the event was included in Fuse TV's list of performance photos that shaped 2012. The group subsequently performed the song for the first time on M Countdown four days later, and on May 11, they performed it at the Expo 2012 opening ceremony in Yeosu. On November 30, 2012, the group performed the song at the 2012 Mnet Asian Music Awards in Hong Kong along with G-Dragon's "Crayon". At the annual SBS Gayo Daejeon festival on December 29, BigBang performed a remix rendition of the song, incorporating parts and dance moves from Psy's "Gangnam Style". They additionally performed the song live at the MBC Gayo Daejejeon on December 31, and at the 22nd Seoul Music Awards on January 31, 2013 along with "Bad Boy".

BigBang performed at the 2013 Mnet Asian Music Awards on November 22, 2013; the group members performed a series of solo works and concluded the performance by reuniting with "Fantastic Baby". The group's performance of the song recorded the ceremony's highest broadcast rating across various networks, garnering a one-minute peak rating of 6.917 percent—a record high for a musical performance at MAMA. At the following year's ceremony on December 3, 2014, G-Dragon and Taeyang performed it along with the duo's single "Good Boy", which was released the previous week. During their 2014–15 Japan Dome Tour X as well as the Seoul and Guangzhou concerts on their Made World Tour in 2015, "Fantastic Baby" was used as the opening number. On November 7, 2015, the group performed a medley of their songs at the 2015 Melon Music Awards, which included several of their singles released in that year along with "Fantastic Baby". The group members additionally included the song in the set lists for their multiple solo concert tours following its release.

== In popular culture ==
In November 2012, "Fantastic Baby" was featured in an episode of American TV show Glee, and was included in the trailer for the movie Pitch Perfect 2 in April 2015, where Jeff Benjamin of Billboard referred to the song as "one of the biggest K-pop hits ever" and considered it a "win for Korean music that has seemingly penetrated yet another traditional media source." The members' visuals in the music video, especially that of G-Dragon's long red-streaked side hair, have been parodied by the Running Man cast members and Dynamic Duo.

== Credits and personnel ==
Credits adapted from Qobuz (Korean edition).

- BigBang – primary vocals
- Teddy Park – composer, lyricist
- G-Dragon – composer, lyricist
- T.O.P – lyricist

== Charts ==
=== Weekly charts ===
2012 weekly chart performance for "Fantastic Baby"
Chart (2012)	Peak position
Japan (Japan Hot 100)	8
South Korea (Gaon)	3
South Korea (K-pop Hot 100)	2
US World Digital Songs (Billboard)	3

2026 weekly chart performance for "Fantastic Baby"
Chart (2026)	Peak position
Singapore Regional (RIAS)	6

=== Monthly charts ===
Monthly chart position for "Fantastic Baby"
Chart (2012)	Peak position
South Korea (Gaon)	1

=== Year-end charts ===
2012 year-end chart positions for "Fantastic Baby"
Chart (2012)	Position
South Korea (Gaon)	5
South Korea (K-pop Hot 100)	9
US World Digital Songs (Billboard)	6

2013 year-end chart positions for "Fantastic Baby"
Chart (2013)	Position
US World Digital Songs (Billboard)	11

2014 year-end chart positions for "Fantastic Baby"
Chart (2014)	Position
US World Digital Songs (Billboard)	24

2016 year-end chart positions for "Fantastic Baby"
Chart (2016)	Position
Japan (Japan Hot 100)	37

2025 year-end chart performance for "Fantastic Baby"
Chart (2025)	Position
South Korea (Circle)	162

== Sales and certifications ==
Sales and certifications for "Fantastic Baby"
Region	Certification	Certified units/sales
Japan (RIAJ) Japanese ver.	2× Platinum	500,000^{*}
South Korea (Gaon)	—	4,036,298
Streaming
Japan (RIAJ)	Platinum	100,000,000^{†}
^{*} Sales figures based on certification alone.^{†} Streaming-only figures based on certification alone.

== Release history ==
Release dates and formats for "Fantastic Baby"
Region	Date	Format(s)	Label(s)	Ref.
Various	February 29, 2012	Digital download; streaming	YG	

== See also ==
- List of best-selling singles in South Korea
