= Monster (BigBang song) =

Single by BigBang

from the EP Still Alive
- Language: Korean
- Released: June 3, 2012
- Studio: YG (Seoul)
- Genre: K-pop; electropop; hip hop
- Length: 3:51
- Label: YG
- Songwriters: G-Dragon; T.O.P
- Producers: G-Dragon; P.K

BigBang singles chronology
"Fantastic Baby" (2012)	"Monster" (2012)	"Loser" (2015)

Music video
- "Monster" on YouTube

"Monster" is a song recorded by South Korean group BigBang. It was released on June 3, 2012, by YG Entertainment as the only single from the repackaged version of their extended play Alive, Still Alive. The song was written by group members G-Dragon and T.O.P, and composed by the previous with Choi Pil-kang. "Monster" peaked atop South Korea's Gaon Digital Chart and reached the Top 10 on the Japan Hot 100.

== Background and promotion ==
After the success of Alive, YG announced that the EP would be repackaged as a special edition studio album with additional songs and re-titled as Still Alive. The special edition and its single "Monster", were released June 3, 2012. Daily music video teasers were released from May 25 until the day before the song's release.

The music video was shot in a blockbuster scale in collaboration with Hyundai Card, with the use of special effects that "took a month to perfect". BigBang and Hyundai Card started a project called "Re-Monster" to promote the music video, aimed to give opportunities for indie bands to reinterpret the song. The new redefined songs were uploaded onto Hyundai Music, where they were judged and the winning musicians would have a chance to release a digital single.

A Japanese version of the song was included at the Japanese studio albums Alive and the greatest hits album The Best of Big Bang 2006-2014. This version was promoted in the TV show Music Japan, which was the only live performance of the single on television.

== Composition ==
Composed by G-Dragon and written by the rapper with Choi Pil-kang, with additional rap parts penned by T.O.P, "Monster" was described as "a modern interpretation of the late 2000s sad, upbeat" BigBang songs, such as "Lies" and "Haru Haru." The instrumental was noted for clashing a "gentle melody against orchestral cacophonies" and for flipping "pensative verses" with an "aggressive chorus." The lyrics "depicts a denial of one's nature."

== Reception ==
Billboard magazine named "Monster" BigBang's eighth best song, writing that the track shows the group "at their most dramatic" and that the "sneaking, subtle intro and outro refrains from T.O.P and G-Dragon" provide the song "the perfect touch of eeriness." The Chicago Sun-Times also named the single as one of the group's best songs, stating that it proved "they could do upbeat songs with a heart."

The song debuted at number one on the Gaon Digital Chart and sold 757,501 digital within its first week. On the second week, the single dropped to number three, selling 286,386 digital downloads and being streamed 2,618,701 times. "Monster" landed at number fourteen on the year-end Gaon Digital Chart, with over 2.3 million downloads, making it the 20th best-selling song of 2012.

== Chart performance ==
Weekly chart performance for "Monster"
Chart (2012)	Peak position
Japan (Japan Hot 100)	6
South Korea (Gaon)	1
South Korea (K-pop Hot 100)	1
US World Digital Songs (Billboard)	3

== Sales ==
Sales for "Monster"
Country	Sales
South Korea (digital)	2,363,148

== Release history ==
Release history and formats for "Monster"
Region	Date	Format	Label
South Korea	June 3, 2012	Digital download	YG Entertainment
Various	June 3, 2012	Digital download	YG Entertainment
