= Bad Boy (BigBang song) =

Single by BigBang

from the EP Alive
- Language: Korean
- Released: February 29, 2012
- Studio: YG (Seoul)
- Genre: R&B; hip hop
- Length: 3:59
- Label: YG
- Songwriters: G-Dragon, T.O.P
- Producers: G-Dragon, Choice37

BigBang singles chronology
"Blue" (2012)	"Bad Boy" (2012)	"Fantastic Baby" (2012)

Music video
- "Bad Boy" on YouTube

"Bad Boy" is a single by South Korean boy band BigBang. It was released on February 29, 2012, by YG Entertainment, as the second single from their EP Alive. The track's R&B and hip hop sound was acclaimed by music critics, who called it one of BigBang's best songs. "Bad Boy" peaked at number two on South Korean's Gaon Digital Chart.

== Release and composition ==
"Bad Boy" was the third song to the featured on the teaser videos from Alive, after "Blue" and "Love Dust." The music video for the track was released on the same day as the album. The song charted at number one on online music charts after its release. The first televised performance was held at the music show Inkigayo on March 11. A Japanese version of the song was included at the Japanese studio albums Alive and The Best of Big Bang 2006-2014.

The song was penned by G-Dragon, who also produced the song with Choice37, and with additional rap parts written by T.O.P. "Bad Boy" is a piano-based R&B track. The production was noted for its roots "in the airiest of hip-hop/R&B summer crossover," for including tropical elements and was compared to the work of Boyz II Men and Justin Timberlake. The rapping parts were described as "mellow," which gave the song an "airy flow." Fuse described "Bad Boy" as a "unique mid-tempo track" that is "richly urban, set against a nostalgic '90s hip hop beat."

== Controversy ==
In 2016, Filipino Rapper Skusta Clee released an exact plagiarised version of the song under the title "Wag Ka Nang Magalit". Lots of BigBang Fans were enraged when they found out about it.

== Critical reception ==
"Bad Boy" is one of the group's most acclaimed work by music critics. Spin listed it at number thirteen in their "Greatest K-Pop songs of all-time list," stating that "Big Bang's five very distinct personalities combine here for a single more singular than any of their K-pop peers can lay claim." Fuse choose it as the only non-English song in their best songs of the year list, calling the track "soft, elegant, refined." "Bad Boy" was also highlighted in The Fader's "A Year in Review" article, being described as "relieving as a joint and a Gatorade."

Billboard placed the track at number five in their "Best K-Pop songs of the Year" list, and claimed that "Bad Boy" stands out for "being the epitome of Big Bang's unique brand of evocative hip-hop" and added "the song is a creeping earworm that hits all the right notes without much apparent effort and was an early adopter of the tropical elements so common in Korean hip-hop nowadays." Sun-Times included the track in their unraked list of ten best BigBang songs. Gawker praised the track for being "so perfect it transcends language."

"Bad Boy" on critic rankings
Publication/critic	List	Rank	Ref.
Billboard	20 Best K-Pop Songs of 2012	5	
Billboard	100 Greatest K-Pop Songs of the 2010s: Staff List	8	
Fuse	40 Best Songs of 2012	—	
Spin	The Greatest K-pop Songs of All Time	13	
The Forty-Five (Rhian Daly)	The 45 best K-pop songs of all-time	8	

== Commercial performance ==
"Bad Boy" debuted and peaked at number two on the Gaon Digital Chart, after the group's own "Blue," and at number one on the Gaon Download Chart, with first week sales of 537,161 downloads. On its second week, the single remained at its peak position on both charts, selling additional 384,125 downloads. For the month of March, "Bad Boy" was the fifth best performing song on Gaon. By the end of the year, "Bad Boy" was the 30rd best selling song of 2012, with over 2.2 million downloads.

== Music video ==
The music video for "Bad Boy" was filmed in a 90s throwback style, using 360-degree rotation-capable MK-V AR Steadicam's Arri Alexa cameras. The shot took place in the New York City neighborhood Williamsburg, down by the Marcy Ave JMZ subway entrance. It reached 100 million views on YouTube in December 2016, making Big Bang the first Korean boy band to have five music videos that have hit over 100 million viewers. Duncan Cooper from The Fader called the video "compelling and refreshingly unforced", writing that the group is "on the ground and they're walking the turf, and for four breezy minutes they're absolutely killing it." Popdust ranked "Bad Boy" fourteen in their list of 20 Best K-pop videos of 2012, commenting that the video "proves that sometimes less really is more."

== Credits and personnel ==
Adapted from Qobuz.

- BigBang – performer
- G-Dragon – composer, writer
- Choice37 – composer
- T.O.P – writer

== Charts ==
2012 chart performance for "Bad Boy"
Chart (2012)	Peak position
South Korea (Gaon Weekly Digital Chart)	2
South Korea (Billboard K-pop Hot 100)	3
US World Digital Songs (Billboard)	3

2026 chart performance for "Bad Boy"
Chart (2026)	Peak position
Singapore Regional (RIAS)	20

== Sales ==
Sales for "Bad Boy"
Country	Sales
South Korea	2,367,663

== Release history ==
Release history and formats for "Bad Boy"
Region	Date	Format	Label
South Korea	February 29, 2012	Digital download	YG Entertainment
Various	February 29, 2012	Digital download	YG Entertainment
Japan	March 28, 2012	Digital download	YG Entertainment, YGEX
