= Alive (BigBang album) =

- Regular edition cover

Studio album by BigBang
- Released: March 28, 2012
- Recorded: YG Studio, Seoul, South Korea; 2012
- Genre: Dance-pop; electropop; hip hop; R&B
- Length: 30:43
- Label: YGEX
- Producer: Yang Hyun-suk (exec.); Max Matsuura (exec.); G-Dragon; Teddy

BigBang chronology
Alive (EP) (2012)	Alive (2012)	Special Final in Dome Memorial Collection (2012)

Alive is the fourth Japanese studio album (sixth overall) by South Korean boy band BigBang. It was released on March 28, 2012 including 10 songs: 4 Japanese versions, 2 new songs and 4 songs already released in Korean from the EP of same name. The album is the first release of the group under the label YGEX, a partnership between the Korean agency YG Entertainment with the Japanese label Avex Trax. The album was re-released on June 20 under the name "Alive -Monster Edition-". It included 9 songs of the Alive original album, 1 Japanese version and 2 songs released in Korean.

== Release ==
The album was released in five different editions: 2 CD+2DVD+Photobook (Type E comes with Goods and an exclusive video on DVD Disc 2. This version is only available at HMV.), 2 CD+DVD (Type B comes with the DVD Disc 2 and Type C with the DVD Disc 3) and a Regular edition.

=== Monster edition ===
A re-released edition, titled Alive -Monster Edition-, was released in 3 versions: CD+DVD+T-shirt, CD+DVD and CD only.

== Composition ==
All songs from the album were written and produced by G-Dragon. On the Korean songs, additional rap lyrics were written by T.O.P. The song "Wings" was written and sung by Daesung.

The album includes 2 original Japanese songs, such as "Ego" and "Feeling"; Japanese versions of the songs "Blue", "Fantastic Baby", "Bad Boy" and "Haru Haru", previously released in Korean and 4 originally Korean songs, "Intro (Alive)", "Love Dust", "Ain't No Fun" and "Wings", Daesung's solo song. The Japanese version of the song "Haru Haru" was previously released on the greatest hits album The Best of Big Bang.

"Feeling" is produced and arranged by the German EDM and electro house producer and DJ Alexander Ridha A.K.A Boys Noize.

== Promotions ==
Since the album does not have singles, all music videos from the album ("Fantastic Baby", "Blue" and "Bad Boy") were released through music TV channels, such as MTV Japan, Space Shower TV and M-ON! (Music On! TV).

== Live performances ==
The group performed the Japanese version of the song "Fantastic Baby" on NTV's show Happy Music on March 30, on NHK's show Music Japan and on NTV's show Music Lovers on April 1.

== Track listings ==
Alive – Digital edition
No.	Title	Lyrics	Music	Arrangement	Length
1.	"Alive" (Intro)	G-Dragon, Teddy, T.O.P	Dee.P, G-Dragon, Teddy	Teddy	0:48
2.	"Fantastic Baby" (Japanese version)	G-Dragon, T.O.P, Teddy, Verbal	G-Dragon, Teddy	Teddy	3:52
3.	"Blue" (Japanese version)	G-Dragon, Teddy, T.O.P, Sunny Boy	G-Dragon, Choice37	Teddy	3:54
4.	"Love Dust"	G-Dragon, Teddy, T.O.P	G-Dragon, Teddy	Teddy	3:52
5.	"Feeling" (Japanese version)	G-Dragon, T.O.P, Sunny Boy	Boys Noize, G-Dragon	Boys Noize	3:34
6.	"Ain't No Fun"	G-Dragon, T.O.P	G-Dragon, DJ Murf, Peejay	DJ Murf, Peejay	3:42
7.	"Bad Boy" (Japanese version)	G-Dragon, T.O.P, Sunny Boy	G-Dragon, Choice 37	Choice37	3:58
8.	"Ego" (Japanese version)	G-Dragon, T.O.P, Sunny Boy	Ham Seung-Chun, Wookjin Kang, G-Dragon	Ham Seung-Chun	3:26
9.	"Wings" (D-Lite solo)	G-Dragon, Daesung (D-Lite)	G-Dragon, PK	PK, Dee.P	3:43
Total length:					30:43

Alive – Physical edition (bonus track)
No.	Title	Lyrics	Music	Arrangement	Length
10.	"Haru Haru" (Japanese version)	Shikata, iNoZzi, G-Dragon, Seiko Fujibayashi	G-Dragon, Daishi Dance	Daishi Dance	4:17
Total length:					34:59

Disc 2: CD+DVD Edition – DVD bonus tracks (Japanese version – limited type A, type B and type E)
No.	Title	Length
1.	"Making of "Alive"" (recording & photo shooting)
2.	"Fantastic Baby" (music video – making of)
3.	"Blue" (music video – making of)
4.	"Bad Boy" (music video – making of)
5.	""Big Bang is Back" Interview"
6.	"Backstage of "2012 YG Family Concert in Japan"" (Big Bang cut; type E only)

Disc 3: CD+DVD Edition – DVD bonus tracks (Japanese version – limited type A, type C and type E)
No.	Title	Length
1.	"Fantastic Baby" (music video -Ver. 0-; Japanese version)
2.	"Blue" (music video; Japanese version)
3.	"Bad Boy" (music video; Japanese version)
4.	"Big Bang is Back" (TV Advertisement)

Alive Monster Edition – Repackage
No.	Title	Lyrics	Music	Arrangement	Length
1.	"Still Alive"	G-Dragon, Teddy, T.O.P	Dee.P, G-Dragon, Teddy	Dee.P, G-Dragon, Teddy	3:18
2.	"Monster" (Japanese version)	G-Dragon, T.O.P, Sunny Boy	G-Dragon, PK	PK, Dee.P	4:38
3.	"Fantastic Baby" (Japanese version)	G-Dragon, T.O.P, Verbal	G-Dragon, Teddy	Teddy	3:50
4.	"Blue" (Japanese version)	G-Dragon, T.O.P, Sunny Boy	G-Dragon, Teddy	Teddy	3:59
5.	"Love Dust"	G-Dragon, Teddy, T.O.P	G-Dragon, Teddy	Teddy	3:51
6.	"Feeling"	G-Dragon, T.O.P, Sunny Boy	Boys Noize, G-Dragon	Boys Noize	3:33
7.	"Ain't No Fun"	G-Dragon, T.O.P	G-Dragon, DJ Murf, Peejay	DJ Murf, Peejay	3:43
8.	"Bad Boy" (Japanese version)	G-Dragon, T.O.P, Sunny Boy	G-Dragon, Choice 37	Choice 37	3:55
9.	"Ego"	G-Dragon, T.O.P, Sunny Boy	Ham Seung-Chun, Wookjin Kang, G-Dragon	Ham Seung-Chun	3:25
10.	"Wings" (D-Lite solo)	G-Dragon, Daesung	G-Dragon, PK	PK, Dee.P	3:43
11.	"Bingle Bingle"	G-Dragon, T.O.P	Teddy, G-Dragon, Won Jin Seo	Teddy, Won Jin Seo	3:00
12.	"Haru Haru" (Japanese version; bonus track)	Shikata, iNoZzi, Shoko Fujibayashi, G-Dragon	G-Dragon, Daishi Dance	Daishi Dance	4:16

CD+DVD Edition – DVD bonus tracks
No.	Title	Length
1.	"Monster" (music video -ver. 0-)
2.	"Fantastic Baby" (music video -ver. final-; Japanese version)
3.	"Blue" (music video; Korean version)
4.	"Bad Boy" (music video; Korean version)
5.	"Fantastic Baby" (music video; Korean version)
6.	"Making of "Alive -Monster Edition-"" (album making of)

== Charts ==
Alive
Chart (2012)	Peak position
Japanese Top Albums (Billboard)	3
Japanese Weekly Albums (Oricon)	3
Japanese Yearly Albums (Oricon)	31

Alive Monster Edition
Chart (2012)	Peak position
Japanese Top Albums (Billboard)	3
Japanese Albums (Oricon)	3

== Sales and certifications ==
Region	Certification	Certified units/sales
Japan (RIAJ)	Gold	217,000

== Accolades ==
Year	Award-giving body	Category	Result
2013	Japan Gold Disc Award	Best 3 Albums (Asian)	Won

== Release history ==
Region	Date	Edition	Format	Label
Japan	March 28, 2012	Alive	CD; CD+DVD; digital download	YGEX
Japan	June 20, 2012	Alive -Monster Edition-	CD; CD+DVD; digital download	YGEX
