= Day6 discography =

- Studio albums: 4
- EPs: 9
- Live albums: 1
- Compilation albums: 2
- Singles: 24

South Korean pop rock band Day6 have released four studio albums, one live album, two compilation albums, nine extended plays and twenty-four singles.

== Albums ==
=== Studio albums ===
==== Korean studio albums ====
List of Korean studio albums, with selected details, chart positions and sales
Title	Details	Peak chart positions		Sales
Title	Details	KOR	US World	Sales
Sunrise	Released: June 7, 2017; Label: JYP Entertainment; Format: CD, digital download, streaming	4	6	KOR: 55,580; JPN: 585
Moonrise	Released: December 6, 2017; Label: JYP Entertainment; Format: CD, digital download, streaming	2	8	KOR: 60,785
The Book of Us: Entropy	Released: October 22, 2019; Label: JYP Entertainment; Format: CD, digital download, streaming	4	10	KOR: 67,682
The Decade	Released: September 5, 2025; Label: JYP Entertainment; Format: CD, digital download, streaming	7	—	KOR: 293,201
"—" denotes releases that did not chart or were not released in that region.

==== Japanese studio albums ====
List of Japanese studio albums, with selected details, chart positions and sales
Title	Details	Peak chart positions		Sales
Title	Details	JPN	JPN Hot	Sales
Unlock	Released: October 17, 2018; Label: Warner Music Japan; Formats: CD, digital download, streaming	21	23	JPN: 6,586

=== Live albums ===
List of live albums, with selected details
Title	Album information
Day6 Live Concert Dream: Coda	Released: November 26, 2016 (limited); Label: JYP Entertainment; Formats: CD+DVD

=== Compilation albums ===
List of compilation albums, with selected details, chart positions, sales, and certifications
Title	Details	Peak chart positions	Sales
Title	Details	JPN	Sales
The Best Day	Released: June 6, 2018 (JPN); Label: Warner Music Japan; Formats: CD, digital download	38	JPN: 1,911
The Best Day2	Released: December 4, 2019 (JPN); Label: Warner Music Japan; Formats: CD, digital download	23	JPN: 4,893

== Extended plays ==
List of extended plays, with selected details, chart positions and sales
Title	Details	Peak chart positions				Sales
Title	Details	KOR	US Heat.	US Ind.	US World	Sales
The Day	Released: September 7, 2015; Label: JYP Entertainment; Format: CD, digital download	6	—	—	2	KOR: 10,481
Daydream	Released: March 30, 2016; Label: JYP Entertainment; Format: CD, digital download, streaming	4	—	—	6	KOR: 18,391
Shoot Me: Youth Part 1	Released: June 26, 2018; Label: JYP Entertainment; Format: CD, digital download, streaming	3	16	46	6	KOR: 76,206
Remember Us: Youth Part 2	Released: December 10, 2018; Label: JYP Entertainment; Format: CD, digital download, streaming	3	—	—	10	KOR: 72,526
The Book of Us: Gravity	Released: July 15, 2019; Label: JYP Entertainment; Format: CD, digital download, streaming	1	20	—	9	KOR: 65,334
The Book of Us: The Demon	Released: May 11, 2020; Label: JYP Entertainment; Format: CD, digital download, streaming	2	—	—	7	KOR: 91,366
The Book of Us: Negentropy	Released: April 19, 2021; Label: JYP Entertainment; Format: CD, digital download, streaming	3	—	—	—	KOR: 114,638
Fourever	Released: March 18, 2024; Label: JYP Entertainment; Format: CD, digital download, streaming	3	—	—	—	KOR: 155,742
Band Aid	Released: September 2, 2024; Label: JYP Entertainment; Format: CD, digital download, streaming	4	—	—	—	KOR: 165,200
"—" denotes releases that did not chart or were not released in that region.

== Singles ==
=== Korean singles ===
List of Korean singles, with selected chart positions, showing year released and album name
Title	Year	Peak chart positions				Sales (Note: Digital downloads)	Certifications	Album
Title	Year	KOR	KOR Bill. (Note: Includes the Billboard K-pop Hot 100 (discontinued between July 16, 2014 and June 4, 2017 and since April 30, 2022), the South Korea Songs chart (launched on May 7, 2022 and discontinued since January 18, 2025), and the Billboard Korea Hot 100 (launched on December 6, 2025).)	US World	WW Excl. US	Sales	Certifications	Album
"Congratulations"	2015	28	—	6	—	KOR: 48,787	—N/a	The Day
"Letting Go" (놓아 놓아 놓아)	2016	127	—	16	—	KOR: 20,197	—N/a	Daydream
"I Wait" (아 왜)	2017	—	—	3	—	—N/a	—N/a	Sunrise
"You Were Beautiful" (예뻤어)	2017	8	16	3	—	KOR: 19,817	—N/a	Sunrise
"How Can I Say" (어떻게 말해)	2017	—	—	3	—	—N/a	—N/a	Sunrise
"I'm Serious" (장난 아닌데)	2017	96	—	5	—	KOR: 24,843	—N/a	Sunrise
"Dance Dance"	2017	—	—	6	—	KOR: 18,411	—N/a	Sunrise
"I Smile" (반드시 웃는다)	2017	98	—	9	—	KOR: 22,523	—N/a	Sunrise
"Hi Hello"	2017	—	—	9	—	—N/a	—N/a	Moonrise
"What Can I Do" (좋은걸 뭐 어떡해)	2017	—	—	9	—	KOR: 14,712	—N/a	Moonrise
"I Loved You"	2017	87	—	6	—	KOR: 25,713	—N/a	Moonrise
"When You Love Someone" (그렇더라고요)	2017	—	—	5	—	—N/a	—N/a	Moonrise
"All Alone" (혼자야)	2017	—	—	11	—	KOR: 15,403	—N/a	Moonrise
"I Like You" (좋아합니다)	2017	88	—	18	—	KOR: 22,081	—N/a	Moonrise
"Shoot Me"	2018	—	—	8	—	—N/a	—N/a	Shoot Me: Youth Part 1
"Beautiful Feeling"	2018	—	—	25	—	—N/a	—N/a	Remember Us: Youth Part 2
"Days Gone By" (행복했던 날들이었다)	2018	175	53	25	—	—N/a	—N/a	Remember Us: Youth Part 2
"Time of Our Life" (한 페이지가 될 수 있게)	2019	4	13	—	—	—N/a	KMCA: 2x Platinum (str.)	The Book of Us: Gravity
"Sweet Chaos"	2019	114	69	—	—	—N/a	—N/a	The Book of Us: Entropy
"Zombie"	2020	18	15	13	—	—N/a	—N/a	The Book of Us: The Demon
"You Make Me"	2021	73	86	—	—	—N/a	—N/a	The Book of Us: Negentropy
"Welcome to the Show"	2024	3	7	—	—	—N/a	KMCA: Platinum (str.)	Fourever
"Melt Down" (녹아내려요)	2024	1	3	—	157	—N/a	—N/a	Band Aid
"Maybe Tomorrow"	2025	35	15	—	—	—N/a	—N/a	Non-album single
"Inside Out"	2025	22	10	—	—	—N/a	—N/a	The Decade
"Dream Bus" (꿈의 버스)	2025	17	12	—	—	—N/a	—N/a	The Decade
"Lovin' the Christmas"	2025	93	—	—	—	—N/a	—N/a	Non-album single
"—" denotes releases that did not chart or were not released in that region. "*" denotes a chart did not exist at that time.

=== Japanese singles ===
List of Japanese singles, with selected chart positions, showing year released and album name
Title	Year	Peak chart positions	Sales (Note: Physical units)	Album
Title	Year	JPN	Sales	Album
"If (Mata Aetara)" (If ～また逢えたら～)	2018	28	JPN: 4,832	Unlock
"Stop the Rain"	2018	69	JPN: 1,198	Unlock
"Breaking Down"	2018	—	—N/a	Unlock
"Finale"	2019	—	—N/a	The Best Day2
"—" denotes releases that did not chart.

== Soundtrack appearances ==
Title	Year	Album
"Lovely Girl"	2013	Bel Ami OST
"Chocolate"	2018	Want More 19 OST

== Other charted songs ==
List of other charted songs, with selected chart positions, showing year released and album name
Title	Year	Peak chart positions				Certifications	Album
Title	Year	KOR	KOR Hot	US World	WW Excl. US	Certifications	Album
"Lean On Me" (오늘은 내게)	2017	—	—	25	—		Sunrise
"Man in a Movie"	2017	—	—	8	—		Sunrise
"I Would" (그럴 텐데)	2017	—	—	9	—		Sunrise
"Goodbye Winter" (겨울이 간다)	2017	—	—	6	—		Sunrise
"Say Wow"	2017	—	—	10	—		Sunrise
"My Day"	2017	—	—	6	—		Sunrise
"I'll Remember" (남겨둘게)	2017	—	—	10	—		Moonrise
"Whatever!" (놀래!)	2017	—	—	15	—		Moonrise
"Be Lazy"	2017	—	—	19	—		Moonrise
"Pouring" (쏟아진다)	2017	—	—	17	—		Moonrise
"I Need Somebody" (누군가 필요해)	2017	—	—	7	—		Moonrise
"Day and Night" (해와 달처럼)	2020	94	38	—	—		The Book of Us: The Demon
"Tick Tock"	2020	115	49	—	—		The Book of Us: The Demon
"Love Me or Leave Me"	2020	68	28	—	—		The Book of Us: The Demon
"Stop" (때려쳐)	2020	137	70	—	—		The Book of Us: The Demon
"1 to 10"	2020	153	77	—	—		The Book of Us: The Demon
"Afraid"	2020	126	57	—	—		The Book of Us: The Demon
"Zombie" (English Ver.)	2020	—	95	—	—		The Book of Us: The Demon
"Happy"	2024	1	1	—	144	KMCA: Platinum (str.)	Fourever
"The Power of Love"	2024	102	—	—	—		Fourever
"Get the Hell Out" (널 제외한 나의 뇌)	2024	91	—	—	—		Fourever
"Sad Ending" (나만 슬픈 엔딩)	2024	95	—	—	—		Fourever
"Let Me Love You" (사랑하게 해주라)	2024	101	—	—	—		Fourever
"Didn't Know" (그게 너의 사랑인지 몰랐어)	2024	103	—	—	—		Fourever
"Monster" (괴물)	2024	42	—	—	—		Band Aid
"She Smiled" (그녀가 웃었다)	2024	33	—	—	—		Band Aid
"Shxtty Game" (망겜)	2024	54	—	—	—		Band Aid
"Help Me Rock&Roll" (도와줘요 Rock&Roll)	2024	55	—	—	—		Band Aid
"Counter"	2024	68	—	—	—		Band Aid
"I'm Fine"	2024	72	—	—	—		Band Aid
"Still There" (아직 거기 살아)	2024	53	—	—	—		Band Aid
"Game Over" (끝났지)	2025	94	—	—	—		Maybe Tomorrow
"Sun, Stay Asleep" (해야 뜨지 말아 줘)	2025	66	—	—	—		The Decade
"Disco Day"	2025	94	—	—	—		The Decade
"My Way"	2025	110	—	—	—		The Decade
"Before the Stars" (별들 앞에서)	2025	99	—	—	—		The Decade
"Take All My Heart"	2025	111	—	—	—		The Decade
"Dream Rider" (날아라! 드림라이더)	2025	115	—	—	—		The Decade
"So It's the End" (드디어 끝나갑니다)	2025	118	—	—	—		The Decade
"Our Season" (우리의 계절)	2025	117	—	—	—		The Decade
"—" denotes releases that did not chart or were not released in that region.

== See also ==
- JYP Entertainment discography
