= You Were Beautiful =

Single by Day6

from the album Sunrise
- Language: Korean
- B-side: "My Day"
- Released: February 6, 2017
- Length: 4:43
- Label: JYP
- Composers: Young K; Wonpil; Hong Ji-sang; Lee Woo Min
- Lyricist: Young K

Day6 singles chronology
"I Wait" (2017)	"You Were Beautiful" (2017)	"How Can I Say" (2017)

Music video
- "You Were Beautiful" on YouTube

"You Were Beautiful" is a song recorded by South Korean boy band Day6 for their first studio album Sunrise. It is the second single released as part of the Every Day6 project, in which the band would release two songs every month on the sixth.

== Release ==
On February 6, 2017 Day6 released the single "You Were Beautiful" and the song "My Day" as a part of the Every Day6 project for the month of February.

== Composition ==
"You Were Beautiful" Is written by Young K and composed by Young K, Wonpil, Lee Woo Min and Homg Ji-sang. "You Were Beautiful" is a song that contains the heart of a man who recalls 'you were beautiful in every moment we were together' while thinking of his past lover. The song is composed in the key F Minor and has 168 beats per minute and a running time of 4 minutes and 43 seconds.

== Track listing ==
Digital download / streaming
No.	Title	Lyrics	Music	Arrangement	Length
1.	"You Were Beautiful" (예뻤어)	Young K	Hong Ji-sang; Lee Woo-min; Young K; Wonpil	Hong Ji-sang; Lee Woo-min	04:43
2.	"My Day"	Young K	Mr. Cho; Joo-hyo; Young K; Wonpil	Mr. Cho; Joo-hyo; Young K; Wonpil; Dowoon	03:00
Total length:					7:43

== Music video ==
The music video is a continuation of their debut music video "Congratulations" with actress Jang Hee-ryung reprising her role as the female lead. It was directed by Naive Creative Production, and because the first Day6 music video to reach a hundred million views.

== Charts ==
=== Weekly charts ===
Weekly chart performance
Chart (2017-2024)	Peak position
South Korea (Circle)	8
South Korea (K-pop Hot 100)	16
US World Digital Songs (Billboard)	3

=== Monthly charts ===
Chart (April 2024)	Peak position
South Korea (Circle)	9

=== Year-end charts ===
2023 year-end chart performance for "Congratulations"
Chart (2023)	Position
South Korea (Circle)	138

2024 year-end chart performance for "Congratulations"
Chart (2024)	Position
South Korea (Circle)	7

2025 year-end chart performance for "Congratulations"
Chart (2025)	Position
South Korea (Circle)	29

== Sales ==
Country	Sales
South Korea (digital)	19,817

== Publication lists ==
Publication lists for "You Were Beautiful"
Publication	List	Rank	Ref.
The Daily Dot	The absolute best K-pop of 2017	Placed	

== Release history ==
Release history
Region	Date	Format	Label
Various	February 6, 2017	Digital download; streaming	JYP
