= How Can I Say =

Single by Day6

from the album Sunrise
- Language: Korean
- B-side: "I Would"
- Released: March 6, 2017
- Length: 3:23
- Label: JYP
- Composers: Young K; Wonpil; Sungjin; Hong Ji-sang; Lee Woo Min
- Lyricists: Young K; Wonpil

Day6 singles chronology
"You Were Beautiful" (2017)	"How Can I Say" (2017)	"I'm Serious" (2017)

Music video
- "How Can I Say" on YouTube

"How Can I Say" is a song recorded by South Korean boy band Day6 for their first studio album Sunrise. It is the third single released as part of the Every Day6 project, in which the band would release two songs every month on the sixth.

== Release ==
On March 6, 2017 Day6 released the single "How Can I Say" and the song "I Would" as a part of the Every Day6 project for the month of March.

== Composition ==
"How Can I Say" Is written by Young K and Wonpil and composed by Young K, Wonpil, Sungjin, Lee Woo Min and Homg Ji-sang. The song is composed in the key B Minor and has 186 beats per minute and a running time of 3 minutes and 23 seconds. The song contains the content of a man who has a cold heart and still doesn't know how to say to the woman who loves him that he doesn’t want to be with her anymore.

== Promotion ==
Day6 held their first comeback stage for "How Can I Say" on Mnet's M Countdown on March 9 they also performed on SBS' Inkigayo on March 12, Show Champion on March 16, KBS' Music Bank on March 17 and MBC's Show! Music Core on March 18.

== Track listing ==
Digital download / streaming
No.	Title	Lyrics	Music	Arrangement	Length
1.	"How Can I Say" (어떻게 말해)	Young K; Wonpil	Hong Ji-sang; Lee Woo-min 'Collapsedone'; Sungjin; Young K; Wonpil; Jae	Hong Ji-sang; Lee Woo-min 'Collapsedone'	03:21
2.	"I Would" (그럴 텐데)	Young K	Hong Ji-sang; Lee Woo-min 'Collapsedone'; Jae; Young K; Wonpil	Hong Ji-sang	03:43
Total length:					7:04

== Charts ==
Weekly chart performance
Chart (2017)	Peak position
US World Digital Songs (Billboard)	3

== Release history ==
Release history
Region	Date	Format	Label
Various	March 6, 2017	Digital download; streaming	JYP
