= Hi Hello =

Single by Day6

from the album Moonrise
- Language: Korean
- B-side: "Be Lazy"
- Released: July 6, 2017
- Length: 3:52
- Label: JYP
- Composers: Young K; Wonpil; Sungjin; Jae; Hong Ji-sang; Lee Woo Min
- Lyricist: Young K

Day6 singles chronology
"I Smile" (2017)	"Hi Hello" (2017)	"What Can I Do" (2017)

Music video
- "Hi Hello" on YouTube

"Hi Hello" is a song recorded by South Korean boy band Day6 for their second studio album Moonrise. It is the seventh single released as part of the Every Day6 project, in which the band would release two songs every month on the sixth.

== Background and release ==
On June 30, 2017, JYP Entertainment showed a teaser image of Day6 leader Sungjin on its official website and social media accounts at noon. The image contains the words 'Hi Hello' and '2017.7.6 12PM', and said that Day6 will release the new song 'Hi Hello' at noon on July 6. On July 6, 2017, Day6 released the single "Hi Hello" and the song "Be Lazy" as a part of the Every Day6 project for the month of July.

== Composition ==
"Hi Hello" was written by Young K and composed by Young K, Wonpil, Sungjin, Jae, Lee Woo Min and Homg Ji-sang. The song is composed in the key D Major and has 78 beats per minute and a running time of 3 minutes and 52 seconds. "Hi Hello" is a song decorated with lyrics of the content of love. With a more comfortable and romantic color than the existing title songs, the three-dimensional vocals that focus on the layer of the chorus stimulate the sensibility of the listener.

== Promotion ==
Day6 first performed "Hi Hello" and "Be Lazy" at the Yes24 Live Hall in Gwangjin-gu, Seoul on July 29 and 30, for their concert 'Every Day6 Concert in July'.

== Track listing ==
Digital download / streaming
No.	Title	Lyrics	Music	Arrangement	Length
1.	"Hi Hello"	Young K	Hong Ji-sang; Lee Woo-min 'Collapsedone'; Jae; Sungjin; Young K; Wonpil	Hong Ji-sang; Lee Woo-min 'Collapsedone'	03:52
2.	"Be Lazy"	Young K	Young K; 220	220	03:14
Total length:					7:06

== Music video ==
The music video shows a refreshing and fresh visual beauty reminiscent of a road movie. The Day6 members in the video created a romantic atmosphere, such as walking alone on the wide road or lying in the back of a running car and enjoying the sunshine. It was directed by Naive Creative Production.

== Charts ==
Weekly chart performance
Chart (2017)	Peak position
US World Digital Songs (Billboard)	9

== Release history ==
Release history
Region	Date	Format	Label
Various	July 6, 2017	Digital download; streaming	JYP
