= I'm Serious (Day6 song) =

"I’m Serious"

Single by Day6

from the album Sunrise
- Language: Korean
- B-side: "Say Wow"
- Released: April 6, 2017
- Length: 3:07
- Label: JYP
- Composers: Young K; Wonpil; Sungjin; Hong Ji-sang; Lee Woo Min
- Lyricists: Young K; Wonpil; Sungjin

Day6 singles chronology
"How Can I Say" (2017)	"I’m Serious" (2017)	"Dance Dance" (2017)

Music video
- "Im Serious" on YouTube

"I’m Serious" is a song recorded by South Korean boy band Day6 for their first studio album Sunrise. It is the fourth single released as part of the Every Day6 project, in which the band would release two songs every month on the sixth.

== Release ==
On April 6, 2017, Day6 released the single "I’m Serious" and the song "Say Wow" as a part of the Every Day6 project for the month of April.

== Composition ==
"I'm Serious" Is written by Young K and Wonpil, Sungjin and composed by Young K, Wonpil, Sungjin, Lee Woo Min and Homg Ji-sang. The song is composed in the key D Major and has 124 beats per minute and a running time of 3 minutes and 07 seconds. "I'm Serious" is a song that expresses the frustration of someone who can't convey their feelings properly. It's a rock genre song that conveys a more comfortable feeling through a vintage rock-like sound.

== Promotion ==
Day6 performed "I'm Serious" on music programs such as Show Champion on April 12, Mnet's M Countdown on April 13 and KBS' Music Bank on April 14.

== Track listing ==
Digital download / streaming
No.	Title	Lyrics	Music	Arrangement	Length
1.	"I'm Serious" (장난 아닌데)	Young K; Sungjin; Wonpil	Hong Ji-sang; Lee Woo-min 'Collapsedone'; Wonpil; Sungjin	Hong Ji-sang; Lee Woo-min 'Collapsedone'	03:14
2.	"Say Wow"	Young K	Hong Ji-sang; Wonpil; Young K	Hong Ji-sang	03:09
Total length:					6:23

== Charts ==
Weekly chart performance
Chart (2017)	Peak position
South Korea (Circle)	96
US World Digital Songs (Billboard)	5

== Sales ==
Country	Sales
South Korea (digital)	24,843

== Release history ==
Release history
Region	Date	Format	Label
Various	April 6, 2017	Digital download; streaming	JYP
