= I Smile =

Single by Day6

from the album Sunrise
- Language: Korean
- Released: July 7, 2017
- Length: 3:47
- Label: JYP
- Composers: Young K; Wonpil; Sungjin; Hong Ji-sang; Lee Woo Min
- Lyricists: Young K; Wonpil

Day6 singles chronology
"Dance Dance" (2017)	"I Smile" (2017)	"Hi Hello" (2017)

Music video
- "I Smile" on YouTube

"I Smile" is a song recorded by South Korean boy band Day6 for their first studio album Sunrise. It is the sixth single released as part of the Every Day6 project, in which the band would release two songs every month.

== Release ==
On June 7, 2017, Day6 released the single "I Smile" and the song "Lean On Me" as well as the album Sunrise in which all other Every Day6 project songs were featured on the album.

== Composition ==
"I Smile" Is written by Young K and Wonpil and composed by Young K, Wonpil, Sungjin, Lee Woo Min and Homg Ji-sang. The song is composed in the key E Major and has 124 beats per minute and a running time of 3 minutes and 47 seconds. "I Smile" features a drum sound that leads the song with a variety of changes, it completes a resonating emotional rock by contrasting with the faint vocals. The song is about having a broken heart and trying to smile in front of the ex-lover.

== Promotion ==
Day6 performed "I Smile" on several music programs first on Mnet's M Countdown on June 8, KBS' Music Bank on June 9. MBC's Show! Music Core on June 10 and SBS' Inkigayo on June 11, 2017.

== Charts ==
Weekly chart performance
Chart (2017)	Peak position
South Korea (Circle)	98
US World Digital Songs (Billboard)	9

== Sales ==
Country	Sales
South Korea (digital)	22,523

== Release history ==
Release history
Region	Date	Format	Label
Various	June 7, 2017	Digital download; streaming	JYP
