= Maybe Tomorrow (Day6 song) =

Single by Day6
- Language: Korean
- B-side: "Game Over"
- Released: May 7, 2025
- Length: 3:45
- Label: JYP
- Composers: Young K; Sungjin; Wonpil; Hong Ji-sang
- Lyricist: Young K

Day6 singles chronology
"Melt Down" (2024)	"Maybe Tomorrow" (2025)	"Inside Out" (2025)

Music video
- "Maybe Tomorrow" on YouTube

"Maybe Tomorrow" is a song recorded by South Korean boy band Day6, it was released as a non-album single by JYP Entertainment on May 7, 2025.

Professional ratings
Review scores
Source	Rating
IZM	3/5 stars

== Background and release ==
On April 25 2025, JYP Entertainment confirmed a Day6 comeback with a poster with the title and date revealed. On April 29, the track list for "Maybe Tomorrow" including its B-side track "Game Over" was released. Individual concept photos of each member was released from May 1 to May 4.

== Composition ==
"Maybe Tomorrow" Is written by Young K and composed by Young K, Sungjin, Wonpil and Homg Ji-sang "Maybe Tomorrow" is described as a ticket hymn of hope sung for those who live today, and the lyrics whispering hope borrowed from the future create a calm wave. On top of the lively drum beat and refreshing sound, the vocals full of appeal are placed to inventive the feeling of blessing.

== Charts ==
=== Weekly charts ===
Weekly chart performance for "Maybe Tomorrow"
Chart (2025)	Peak position
South Korea (Circle)	35
South Korea (K-pop Hot 100)	15

=== Monthly charts ===
Monthly chart performance for "Maybe Tomorrow"
Chart (May 2025)	Peak position
South Korea (Circle)	62

== Publication lists ==
Publication lists for "Maybe Tomorrow"
Publication	List	Rank	Ref.
Billboard	The 25 Best K-Pop Songs of 2025 (So Far): Critic's Picks	8	
Billboard	The 25 Best K-Pop Songs of 2025: Staff Picks	13	
The Hollywood Reporter	The 40 Best K-Pop Songs of 2025	17	

== Accolades ==
Music program awards for "Maybe Tomorrow"
Program	Date	Ref.
Show! Music Core	May 17, 2025	

== Release history ==
Release history
Region	Date	Format	Label
Various	May 7, 2025	Digital download; streaming	JYP
