= Dowoon =

South Korean musician (born 1995)

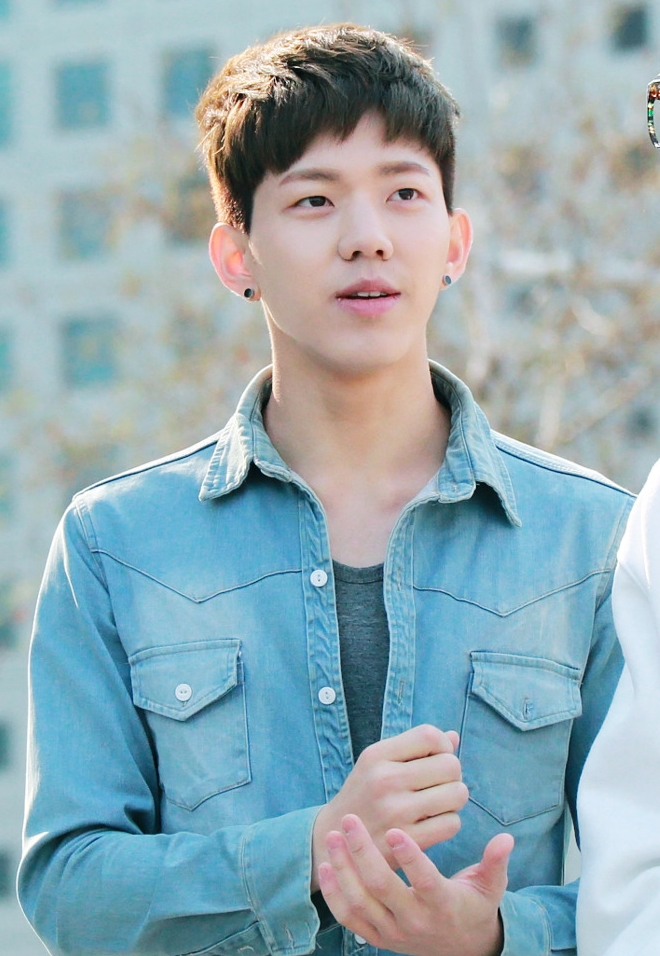
- Yoon in 2016

Background information
- Born: Yoon Do-woon; August 25, 1995 (age 31); Seoul, South Korea
- Genres: K-pop; rock; pop
- Occupation: Musician
- Instruments: Vocals; drums
- Years active: 2015–present
- Label: JYP
- Member of: Day6; Even of Day; JYP Nation

Korean name
- Hangul: 윤도운
- Hanja: 尹度云
- RR: Yun Doun
- MR: Yun Toun

Yoon Do-woon (Korean: 윤도운; born August 25, 1995), known mononymously as Dowoon, is a South Korean musician, best known as the drummer and vocalist of the pop rock band Day6.

== Early life ==
Yoon Dowoon was born on August 25, 1995, in Seoul, South Korea. He has an older sister. He attended Busan Arts College.

== Career ==
Yoon was one of the fastest debut trainees in JYP Entertainment. He only went through 3-month trainee life before debuting.

On September 7, 2015, Yoon debuted as one of the members of Day6. The group released their debut EP, The Day, with the lead single "Congratulations".

On March 14, 2018, he made his Japanese debut as a member of Day6 with their Japanese single "If ～また逢えたら～".

On August 31, 2020, Yoon alongside Young K and Wonpil debuted as Even of Day, a sub-unit of Day6, and released their debut EP The Book of Us: Gluon. He was appointed as the leader of the sub-unit.

On September 27, 2021, Yoon made his solo debut with a digital single entitled "Out of the Blue". He participated in the lyrics writing and composition of his solo debut song.

In his 2021 solo debut with 'Out of the Blue', Dowoon explored his identity as a vocalist. He stated in an interview with Topclass that the project was a journey to find his own voice and express emotions beyond his role as a drummer.

In January 2026, Yoon was announced as a cast member on Na Yeong-seok's upcoming variety show Take a Hike!.

== Personal life ==
On December 28, 2021, Yoon announced his enlistment through V Live Broadcast. He enlisted on January 17, 2022, and later served as a member of the military band. He was discharged on July 16, 2023.

On September 28, 2024, Yoon threw the first pitch before the match between KIA and Lotte at the Sajik Stadium in Busan, South Korea.

Yoon enjoys fishing as a hobby. During his military service, he would spend his service leaves by fishing.

== Discography ==
=== Singles ===
| Title | Year | Album |
|---|---|---|
| "Out of the Blue" (문득) (Duet with. Song Heejin) | 2021 | Non-album singles |

=== Other appearances ===
List of non-single guest appearances, showing year released and album name
| Title | Year | Album |
|---|---|---|
| "넌 내게 반했어 (with No Brain, Sungjin)" (You Have A Crush on Me) | 2026 | No Brain 30th Anniversary Part.5 |

=== Songwriting credits ===
All song credits are sourced from the KOMCA database.

| Year | Title | Artist(s) | Album | Lyrics | | Music | | Arrangement | | Notes |
| Year | Title | Artist(s) | Album | Credited | With | Credited | With | Credited | With | Notes |
|---|---|---|---|---|---|---|---|---|---|---|
| 2015 | "Free하게" (Freely) | Day6 | The Day | Yes | Naru, Sungjin, Jae, Young K, Wonpil, Lim Jun-hyeok | Yes | Naru, Sungjin, Jae, Young K, Wonpil, Lim Jun-hyeok | No | —N/a | |
| 2015 | "이상하게 계속 이래" (Out of My Mind) | Day6 | The Day | Yes | Sungjin, Jae, Young K, Wonpil, Lim Jun-hyeok | Yes | Andrew Choi, 220, Sungjin, Jae, Young K, Wonpil, Lim Jun-hyeok | No | —N/a | |
| 2015 | "Congratulations" | Day6 | The Day | Yes | Sungjin, Jae, Young K, Wonpil, Lim Jun-hyeok | Yes | Hong Ji-sang, Lee Woo-min, Sungjin, Jae, Young K, Wonpil, Lim Jun-hyeok | No | —N/a | |
| 2015 | "버릇이 됐어" (Habits) | Day6 | The Day | Yes | Mr.Cho, Sungjin, Jae, Young K, Wonpil, Lim Jun-hyeok | Yes | Mr.Cho, Park Gun-woo, Sungjin, Jae, Young K, Wonpil, Lim Jun-hyeok | Yes | Mr.Cho, Park Gun-woo, Sungjin, Jae, Young K, Wonpil, Lim Jun-hyeok | |
| 2015 | "태양처럼" (Like That Sun) | Day6 | The Day | Yes | Frants, Sungjin, Jae, Young K, Wonpil, Lim Jun-hyeok | Yes | Frants, Sungjin, Jae, Young K, Wonpil, Lim Jun-hyeok | No | —N/a | |
| 2015 | "Colors" | Day6 | The Day | Yes | Mr.Cho, Sungjin, Jae, Young K, Wonpil, Lim Jun-hyeok | Yes | Mr.Cho, Jeon Jeong-hoon, Park Gun-woo, Sungjin, Jae, Young K, Wonpil, Lim Jun-hyeok | No | —N/a | |
| 2015 | "Eyeless" | Day6 | Non-album singles | Yes | Sungjin, Jae, Young K, Wonpil, Lim Jun-hyeok | Yes | Sungjin, Jae, Young K, Wonpil, Lim Jun-hyeok | —N/a | —N/a | 2015 Day6 1st Live Concert [D-Day] |
| 2015 | "You" | Day6 | Non-album singles | Yes | Sungjin, Jae, Young K, Wonpil, Lim Jun-hyeok | Yes | Sungjin, Jae, Young K, Wonpil, Lim Jun-hyeok | —N/a | —N/a | 2015 Day6 1st Live Concert [D-Day] |
| 2015 | "Pandora" | Day6 | Non-album singles | Yes | Sungjin, Jae, Young K, Wonpil, Lim Jun-hyeok | Yes | Sungjin, Jae, Young K, Wonpil, Lim Jun-hyeok | —N/a | —N/a | 2015 Day6 1st Live Concert [D-Day] |
| 2016 | "Sing Me" | Day6 | Daydream | No | —N/a | Yes | Nuplay, Neil Nallas, Walter Pok, Sungjin, Jae, Young K, Wonpil | No | —N/a | |
| 2016 | "First Time" | Day6 | Daydream | Yes | Sungjin, Jae, Young K, Wonpil | Yes | Hong Ji-sang, Lee Woo-min, Sungjin, Jae, Young K, Wonpil | No | —N/a | |
| 2017 | "My Day" | Day6 | Sunrise | No | —N/a | No | —N/a | Yes | Cho Gae-hyuk, Ju Hyo, Young K, Wonpil | |
| 2017 | "Dance Dance" | Day6 | Sunrise | No | —N/a | Yes | Hong Ji-sang, Lee Woo-min, Sungjin, Jae, Young K, Wonpil | No | —N/a | |
| 2018 | "Adventure" | Himself | —N/a | —N/a | —N/a | Yes | Cha Il-hun | —N/a | —N/a | Every Day6 Finale Concert - The Best Moments |
| 2018 | "원하니까" (Still) | Day6 | Shoot Me: Youth Part 1 | No | —N/a | Yes | Hong Ji-sang, Lee Woo-min, Sungjin, Jae, Young K, Wonpil | No | —N/a | |
| 2018 | "Stop The Rain" | Day6 | Unlock | No | —N/a | Yes | Shinichi Ubukata, Sungjin, Jae, Young K, Wonpil | No | —N/a | |
| 2018 | "Falling" | Day6 | Unlock | No | —N/a | Yes | Shinichi Ubukata, Sungjin, Jae, Young K, Wonpil | No | —N/a | |
| 2019 | "Smash" | Himself | —N/a | —N/a | —N/a | Yes | Young K, Cha Il-hun | —N/a | —N/a | Day6 World Tour Gravity in Seoul |
| 2021 | "문득" (Out of The Blue) | Himself, Song Hee-jin | Non-album singles | Yes | Song Hee-jin | Yes | Song Hee-jin, Kevin Cho, Cha Il-hoon, Yue | No | —N/a | |
| 2024 | "Loveholic" | Day6 | Non-album singles | No | —N/a | No | —N/a | Yes | Cha Il-hun | |
| 2024 | "괴물" (Monster) | Day6 | Band Aid | No | —N/a | Yes | Sungjin, Young K, Wonpil, Hong Ji-sang | No | —N/a | |
| 2026 | "나의 우리" (Shame) | ChRocktikal | We break, you awake | No | —N/a | Yes | Lee Si-yeon, Lee Won-seok | No | —N/a | |
| 2026 | "명작" (Masterpiece) | ChRocktikal | We break, you awake | No | —N/a | Yes | Lee Si-yeon, Lee Won-seok | No | —N/a | |
