= Lovin' the Christmas =

Single by Day6
- Language: Korean
- Released: December 15, 2025
- Length: 3:02
- Label: JYP
- Composers: Young K; Sungjin; Wonpil; Hong Ji-sang
- Lyricist: Young K

Day6 singles chronology
"Dream Bus" (2025)	"Lovin' the Christmas" (2025)

Music video
- "Lovin' the Christmas" on YouTube

"Lovin' the Christmas" is a song recorded by South Korean boy band Day6. It is the group's first holiday single and was released by JYP Entertainment on December 15, 2025.

== Background and release ==
On December 5, 2025, JYP Entertainment first posted a Christmas special single poster on Day6 official social media accounts. JYP released teasers of each member, the teaser contains various contents such as the original calendar cover, a voice message, handwriting, and individual photos.

== Composition ==
"Lovin' the Christmas" Is written by Young K and composed by Young K, Sungjin, Wonpil and Hong Ji-sang. "Lovin' the Christmas" is described as a warm and exciting Christmas story which has a Motown sound of the 60s and 70s and conveys a vintage mood, in which the romantic lyrics on the sparkling melody maximise the fluffy atmosphere.

The song is composed in the key B-Sharp Major and has 155 beats per minute and a running time of 3 minutes and 2 seconds.

== Promotion ==
The group held a 360-degree special concert for three nights at KSPO Dome in titled "The Present 2025", between December 19 to 21, in which they first performed "Lovin' the Christmas".

== Charts ==
Weekly chart performance for "Lovin' the Christmas"
Chart (2025)	Peak position
South Korea (Circle)	93

== Release history ==
Release history
Region	Date	Format	Label
Various	December 15, 2025	Digital download; streaming	JYP
