= The Best Day (Day6 album) =

Compilation album by Day6
- Released: June 6, 2018
- Recorded: 2015–2018
- Genre: Pop rock; ballad
- Length: 65:50
- Language: Korean; English; Japanese
- Label: Warner Music Japan

Day6 chronology
Moonrise (2017)	The Best Day (2018)	Shoot Me: Youth Part 1 (2018)

The Best Day is the first compilation album by South Korean band Day6, released on June 6, 2018 through Warner Music Japan. It features all the title tracks released by the band from their debut extended play The Day to their second studio album Moonrise, the English versions of "Congratulations" and "You Were Beautiful" as well as the bilingual version of "I Wait".

== Background and release ==
In April 2018, it was announced that Day6's first compilation album would be released on June 6.

== Promotions ==
The band promoted the album as they held their first Japan solo concert entitled DAY6 1st LIVE in JAPAN “THE BEST DAY" on June 13–14, 2018, in Tokyo and Osaka. Both concerts were sold out.

== Track listing ==
No.	Title	Writer(s)	Producer(s)	Length
1.	"I Wait" (아 왜)	Young K	Hong Ji-sang; Lee Woo-min; Jae; Young K; Wonpil	3:38
2.	"You Were Beautiful" (예뻤어)	Young K	Hong Ji-sang; Lee Woo-min; Wonpil; Young K	4:43
3.	"How Can I Say" (어떻게 말해)	Young K; Wonpil	Hong Ji-sang; Lee Woo-min; Jae; Young K; Wonpil; Sungjin	3:21
4.	"I'm Serious" (장난 아닌데)	Young K; Sungjin; Wonpil	Hong Ji-sang; Lee Woo-min; Wonpil; Sungjin	3:14
5.	"DANCE DANCE"	Young K	Hong Ji-sang; Lee Woo-min; Jae; Sungjin; Young K; Wonpil; Dowoon	3:43
6.	"I Smile" (반드시 웃는다)	Young K; Wonpil	Hong Ji-sang; Lee Woo-min; Sungjin; Young K; Wonpil	3:47
7.	"Hi Hello"	Young K	Hong Ji-sang; Lee Woo-min; Jae; Sungjin; Young K; Wonpil	3:52
8.	"What Can I Do" (좋은걸 뭐 어떡해)	Young K	Hong Ji-sang; Lee Woo-min; Jae; Sungjin; Young K; Wonpil	3:52
9.	"I Loved You"	Young K	Hong Ji-sang; Lee Woo-min	3:54
10.	"When You Love Someone" (그렇더라고요)	Young K	Hong Ji-sang; Lee Woo-min	3:46
11.	"All Alone" (혼자야)	Young K	Hong Ji-sang	3:44
12.	"I Like You" (좋아합니다)	Young K	Hong Ji-sang; Lee Woo-min	3:57
13.	"Congratulations" (Final Version)	Day6	Hong Ji-sang; Lee Woo-min	3:47
14.	"Letting Go" (놓아 놓아 놓아 (Rebooted Version))	Young K; Wonpil	Hong Ji-sang; Lee Woo-min; Young K; Wonpil	4:11
15.	"Congratulations" (English Version)	Day6	Hong Ji-sang; Lee Woo-min; Day6	3:47
16.	"You Were Beautiful" (예뻤어 (English Version))	Young K	Hong Ji-sang; Lee Woo-min; Wonpil; Young K	4:43
17.	"I Wait" (아 왜 (Japanese Version))	Jae; Young K	Hong Ji-sang; Lee Woo-min; Jae; Young K; Wonpil	3:38
Total length:				65:50

Limited edition DVD
No.	Title	Length
1.	"Congratulations (English Ver.)" (Studio Live Music Video)
2.	"You Were Beautiful (English Ver.)" (Studio Live Music Video)
3.	"I Wait (Japanese Ver.)" (Studio Live Music Video)

Digital edition (Japan)
No.	Title	Length
1.	"DANCE DANCE" (New Ver.)	3:43
2.	"Congratulations" (English Ver.)	3:47
3.	"You Were Beautiful" (English Ver.)	3:39
4.	"I Wait" (Japanese Ver.)	4:44
Total length:		15:53

Digital edition (International)
No.	Title	Length
1.	"Congratulations" (English Ver.)	3:47
2.	"You Were Beautiful" (English Ver.)	3:39
3.	"I Wait" (Japanese Ver.)	4:44
Total length:		12:10

== Editions ==
There are two versions of this album available: the Regular Edition and the Limited Edition.

- Regular Edition (WPCL-12883): This edition includes the CD only.
- Limited Edition (WPZL-31470): This edition comes with a DVD and a 40-page booklet.

== Charts ==
Chart (2018)	Peak position
Japanese Albums (Oricon)	38

== Sales ==
Country	Digital sales
Japan (Oricon)	1,911
