= I Wait (Day6 song) =

Single by Day6

from the album Sunrise
- Language: Korean
- B-side: "Goodbye Winter"
- Released: January 6, 2017
- Length: 3:38
- Label: JYP
- Composers: Young K; Wonpil; Jae; Hong Ji-sang; Lee Woo Min
- Lyricist: Young K

Day6 singles chronology
"Letting Go" (2016)	"I Wait" (2017)	"You Were Beautiful" (2017)

Music video
- "I Wait" on YouTube

"I Wait" is a song recorded by South Korean boy band Day6 for their first studio album Sunrise. It is the first single released as part of the Every Day6 project, in which the band would release two songs every month on the sixth.

== Background and release ==
On December 29, 2016, Day6 announced their upcoming monthly project in 2017 titled Every Day6, in which the band would release two songs every month on the sixth and hold concerts over the weekend prior to the song's release. On January 6, 2017, they released the single "I Wait" and the song "Beautiful Winter".

== Composition ==
"I Wait" Is written by Young K and composed by Young K, Wonpil, Jae, Lee Woo Min and Homg Ji-sang. The song is composed in the key B Minor and has 175 beats per minute and a running time of 3 minutes and 38 seconds. "I Wait" is a song about a man who is struggling because of a woman, who has an ambiguous attitude compared to his love.

== Track listing ==
Digital download / streaming
No.	Title	Lyrics	Music	Arrangement	Length
1.	"I Wait" (아 왜)	Young K	Hong Ji-sang; Lee Woo-min; Jae; Young K; Wonpil	Hong Ji-sang; Lee Woo-min	03:38
2.	"Goodbye Winter" (겨울이 간다)	Sungjin; Jae; Young K; YUE; Cha Il-hoon	Sungjin; Jae; Young K; YUE; Cha Il-hoon	YUE; Cha Il-hoon; Yoon Eun-suk	03:07
Total length:					6:46

== Charts ==
Weekly chart performance
Chart (2017)	Peak position
US World Digital Songs (Billboard)	3

== Publication lists ==
Publication lists for "I Wait"
Publication	List	Rank	Ref.
Billboard	The 100 Greatest K-Pop Songs of the 2010s	81	

== Release history ==
Release history
Region	Date	Format	Label
Various	January 6, 2017	Digital download; streaming	JYP
