= Melt Down =

Single by Day6

from the EP Band Aid
- Language: Korean
- Released: September 2, 2024
- Length: 2:46
- Label: JYP
- Composers: Young K; Sungjin; Wonpil; Hong Ji-sang
- Lyricist: Young K

Day6 singles chronology
"Welcome to the Show" (2024)	"Melt Down" (2024)	"Maybe Tomorrow" (2025)

Music video
- "Melt Down" on YouTube

"Melt Down" is a song recorded by South Korean boy band Day6 for their ninth extended play, Band Aid. It was released as the EP's lead single by JYP Entertainment on September 2, 2024.

== Background and release ==
On August 9, 2024 JYP Entertainment released a teaser video announcing Day6's ninth EP through their social media accounts, in which the members of Day6 are playing instruments. JYP Entertainment posted concept photos of each member of Day6 and posted four group images on August 30. On September 2, 2024, both "Melt Down" and their ninth EP, Band Aid, were released.

== Composition ==
"Melt Down" Is written by Young K and composed by Young K, Sungjin, Wonpil and Hong Ji-sang. "Melt Down" is characterized by melodic punk sounds accentuated by a drum beat; its lyrics narrate the emotion brought by finding a love that heals and brings warmth to one's life. The song is composed in the key F minor and has 185 beats per minute and a running time of 2 minutes and 46 seconds.

== Promotion ==
Day6 held their first comeback stage for "Melt Down" on Mnet M Countdown on September 5. Day6 also performed on three other music programs in the first week of promotion: Music Bank on September 6, Show! Music Core, on September 7 and SBS's Inkigayo on September 8.

== Accolades ==
Music program wins
Program	Date (3 total)	Ref.
Show! Music Core (MBC)	September 14	
Show! Music Core (MBC)	September 21	
Show! Music Core (MBC)	September 28	

== Charts ==
=== Weekly charts ===
Weekly chart performance for "Melt Down"
Chart (2024)	Peak position
South Korea (Circle)	1
South Korea (K-pop Hot 100)	3
Global Excl. US (Billboard)	157

=== Monthly charts ===
Monthly chart performance for "Melt Down"
Chart (September 2024)	Peak position
South Korea (Circle)	3

=== Year-end charts ===
2024 year-end chart performance for "Melt Down"
Chart (2024)	Position
South Korea (Circle)	98

== Release history ==
Release history
Region	Date	Format	Label
Various	September 2, 2024	Digital download; streaming	JYP
