= Dance Dance (Day6 song) =

Single by Day6

from the album Sunrise
- Language: Korean
- B-side: "Man in a Movie"
- Released: May 8, 2017
- Length: 3:43
- Label: JYP
- Composers: Day6; Hong Ji-sang; Lee Woo Min
- Lyricist: Young K

Day6 singles chronology
"I'm Serious" (2017)	"Dance Dance" (2017)	"I Smile" (2017)

Music video
- "Dance Dance" on YouTube

"Dance Dance" is a song recorded by South Korean boy band Day6 for their first studio album Sunrise. It is the fifth single released as part of the Every Day6 project, in which the band would release two songs every month.

== Release ==
On May 8, 2017, Day6 released the single "Dance Dance" and the song "Man in a Movie" as a part of the Every Day6 project for the month of May. On May 6 and 7, "Dance Dance" and "Man in a movie" were first performed live at the Move Hall in Seogyo-dong, Seoul.

== Composition ==
"Dance Dance" Is written by Young K and composed by Day6, Lee Woo Min and Homg Ji-sang. The song is composed in the key E Major and has 170 beats per minute and a running time of 3 minutes and 43 seconds. "Dance Dance" is a free-willing song that contains the content of playing without thinking for today. It is a rock genre song that catches the ears with the strong and sweet chord composition of fast BPM.

== Music video ==
The music video for "Dance Dance" shows the natural appearance of Day6 members in a music studio and shows the charm of an artist who is immersed in music work and performance. It was directed by Naive Creative Production.

== Track listing ==
Digital download / streaming
No.	Title	Lyrics	Music	Arrangement	Length
1.	"Dance Dance"	Young K	Hong Ji-sang; Lee Woo-min 'Collapsedone'; Day6	Hong Ji-sang; Lee Woo-min 'Collapsedone'	03:43
2.	"Man in a Movie"	Young K	Hong Ji-sang; Sungjin; Young K; Wonpil	Hong Ji-sang	03:46
Total length:					7:19

== Charts ==
Weekly chart performance
Chart (2017)	Peak position
US World Digital Songs (Billboard)	6

== Sales ==
Country	Sales
South Korea (digital)	18,411

== Release history ==
Release history
Region	Date	Format	Label
Various	May 8, 2017	Digital download; streaming	JYP
