= Letting Go (Day6 song) =

Single by Day6

from the EP Daydream
- Language: Korean
- Released: March 30, 2016
- Length: 3:50
- Label: JYP
- Composers: Young K; Wonpil; Hong Ji-sang; Lee Woo Min
- Lyricists: Young K; Wonpil

Day6 singles chronology
"Congratulations" (2015)	"Letting Go" (2016)	"I Wait" (2017)

Music video
- "Letting Go" on YouTube

"Letting Go" is a song recorded by South Korean boy band Day6 for their second extended play Daydream. It was released as the EP's lead single by JYP Entertainment on March 30, 2016. It is the first release by Day6 as a five-member group since the departure of Junhyeok, on February 27, 2016.

Professional ratings
Review scores
Source	Rating
IZM	3/5 stars

== Background and release ==
On March 23, 2016 JYP Entertainment first released the group concept photo as well as individual concept photos of each member on March 25, 2016. On March 28, 2016 JYP Entertainment released the music video teaser for the song. In the 22-second video, DAY6 expresses the sadness of the man who has no choice but to let go of the woman he loves.

== Composition ==
"Letting Go" Is written by Young K and Wonpil and composed by Young K, Wonpil, Lee Woo Min and Homg Ji-sang. The song is composed in the key F minor and has 170 beats per minute and a running time of 3 minutes and 50 seconds.

== Promotion ==
On March 31, 2016, Day6 held their first comeback stage for the song on Mnet's M Countdown. They also performed on KBS' Music Bank on April 1, SBS' Inkigayo on April 3, and Arirang TV' Simply K-Pop on April 8.

== Charts ==
Weekly chart performance
Chart (2016)	Peak position
South Korea (Circle)	127
US World Digital Songs (Billboard)	16

== Awards and nominations ==
Awards and nominations
Year	Organization	Award	Result	Ref.
2016	Mnet Asian Music Awards	Best Band Performance	Nominated	
2016	Mnet Asian Music Awards	Song of the Year	Nominated	

== Sales ==
Country	Sales
South Korea (digital)	20,197

== Release history ==
Release history
Region	Date	Format	Label
Various	March 30, 2016	Digital download; streaming	JYP
