= 30 (Sungjin album) =

- Digital cover

Studio album by Sungjin
- Released: November 5, 2024
- Genre: K-pop
- Length: 33:01
- Language: Korean
- Label: Studio J; JYP

Singles from 30
- 1. "Check Pattern" Released: November 5, 2024

30 is the debut studio album by South Korean singer Sungjin. It was released on November 5, 2024, through Studio J and JYP Entertainment. The album consists of 10 tracks, including the lead single "Check Pattern".

== Background ==
In June 2024, Sungjin performed "Wednesday Night", one of the track from his solo album, on their third fanmeeting, "I Need My Day".

On October 16, 2024, it was announced that Sungjin would release his first full-length solo album on November 5, 2024. He dropped a cinematic film, in which it showed his travel through 30 seconds, 30 minutes, 30 days and 30 weeks along with his narration, on October 17, 2024. The tracklist of his album was revealed on October 22, 2024. He wrote and composed all tracks in his album while collaborate with other writers.

On October 27, 2024, he released the live album sampler, where he showcased the live version of the highlights of each track. He revealed the concept photos for the album from October 28 to October 31, with four different themes and concepts, including day, evening, night and dawn. He then proceeded to reveal the album sampler on November 1, 2024, showing the highlights of all ten tracks of the album.

== Promotion ==
On November 8–10, 2024, Sungjin held his first solo concert with the same name as his album, 30, at Kwangwoon University.

== Track listing ==
30 track listing
No.	Title	Lyrics	Music	Arrangement	Length
1.	"Covered in Love" (동화 속 아이처럼)	Sungjin	Ming Ji-syeon; Sungjin	Ming Ji-syeon	2:59
2.	"Check Pattern"	Sungjin; Lee Joo-hyoung; Jukjae	Lee Joo-hyoung; Jukjae; Sungjin	Lee Joo-hyoung; Jukjae	3:17
3.	"I Don't Wanna Do Anything" (아무것도 안 하고 싶다)	Sungjin	MooF; Sungjin	MooF	4:04
4.	"Nowhere You Are" (어디에도 없는 널)	Sungjin; D'tour	Sungjin; Aaron Kim; HAHM; BYDOR ARCHIVE; wez; Isaac Han	HAHM; BYDOR ARCHIVE; Aaron Kim	3:46
5.	"As Always" (나무는 결국 겨울을 견뎌낼 거야)	Sungjin	Sungjin; Sim Hyun; Oh Ji-hyun	Sim Hyun; Oh Ji-hyun	3:22
6.	"Wednesday Night"	Sungjin; D'tour	Sungjin; Aaron Kim; D'tour; Isaac Han	Aaron Kim	2:39
7.	"Easy"	Sungjin	Sungjin; Sim Hyun	Sim Hyun	2:39
8.	"You Wake Me Up"	Sungjin	Ming Ji-syeon; Sungjin	Ming Ji-syeon	3:27
9.	"I Don't Wanna Lose"	Sungjin; Da-sol	Sungjin; Da-sol	Da-sol	3:27
10.	"Memories"	Sungjin	Sungjin; Sim Hyun; Oh Ji-hyun	Sim Hyun; Oh Ji-hyun	3:21
Total length:					33:01

== Charts ==
=== Weekly charts ===
Weekly chart performance for 30
Chart (2024)	Peak position
South Korean Albums (Circle)	7

=== Monthly charts ===
Monthly chart performance for 30
Chart (2024)	Position
South Korean Albums (Circle)	35

== Release history ==
Release dates and formats for 30
Region	Date	Format	Label
Various	November 5, 2024	CD; digital download; streaming	Studio J; JYP
