= Moonrise (Day6 album) =

Studio album by Day6
- Released: December 6, 2017
- Recorded: 2017
- Studio: JYPE Studios
- Genre: Pop rock
- Language: Korean
- Labels: JYP Entertainment; Genie Music
- Producer: J. Y. Park "The Asiansoul"

Day6 chronology
Sunrise (2017)	Moonrise (2017)	The Best Day (2018)

Singles from Moonrise
- 1. "Hi Hello" Released: July 6, 2017; 2. "What Can I Do" Released: August 7, 2017; 3. "I Loved You" Released: September 6, 2017; 4. "When You Love Someone" Released: September 29, 2017; 5. "All Alone" Released: November 6, 2017; 6. "I Like You" Released: December 6, 2017

Moonrise is the second studio album by South Korean pop rock band Day6. It was released by JYP Entertainment on December 6, 2017. The album features 18 tracks, consisting of all 10 tracks that were previously released from July to November 2017 through Every Day6, tracks from Every Day6 December, and final versions of the five remaining songs from their first EP The Day.

== Track listing ==
No.	Title	Lyrics	Music	Arrangement	Length
1.	"Better Better"	Young K	Hong Ji-sang; Lee Woo-min 'Collapsedone'; Jae; Sungjin; Young K; Wonpil	Hong Ji-sang; Lee Woo-min 'Collapsedone'	3:31
2.	"I Like You" (좋아합니다)	Young K	Hong Ji-sang; Lee Woo-min 'Collapsedone'; Jae; Sungjin; Young K; Wonpil	Hong Ji-sang; Lee Woo-min 'Collapsedone'	3:57
3.	"What Can I Do" (좋은걸 뭐 어떡해)	Young K	Hong Ji-sang; Lee Woo-min 'Collapsedone'; Jae; Sungjin; Young K; Wonpil	Hong Ji-sang; Lee Woo-min 'Collapsedone'	3:52
4.	"I'll Remember" (남겨둘게)	Young K	Hong Ji-sang; Lee Woo-min 'Collapsedone'; Jae; Sungjin; Young K; Wonpil	Hong Ji-sang; Lee Woo-min 'Collapsedone'	3:54
5.	"Whatever!" (놀래!)	Young K	Hong Ji-sang; Lee Woo-min 'Collapsedone'; Jae; Sungjin; Young K; Wonpil	Hong Ji-sang; Lee Woo-min 'Collapsedone'	3:16
6.	"Be Lazy"	Young K	220; Young K	220	3:14
7.	"Hi Hello"	Young K	Hong Ji-sang; Lee Woo-min 'Collapsedone'; Jae; Sungjin; Young K; Wonpil	Hong Ji-sang; Lee Woo-min 'Collapsedone'	3:52
8.	"I Loved You"	Young K	Hong Ji-sang; Lee Woo-min 'Collapsedone'; Jae; Sungjin; Young K; Wonpil	Hong Ji-sang; Lee Woo-min 'Collapsedone'	3:54
9.	"When You Love Someone" (그렇더라고요)	Young K	Hong Ji-sang; Lee Woo-min 'Collapsedone'; Jae; Sungjin; Young K; Wonpil	Hong Ji-sang; Lee Woo-min 'Collapsedone'	3:46
10.	"All Alone" (혼자야)	Young K	Hong Ji-sang; Jae; Sungjin; Young K; Wonpil	Hong Ji-sang	3:44
11.	"Pouring" (쏟아진다)	Young K	Hong Ji-sang; Lee Woo-min 'Collapsedone'; Jae; Sungjin; Young K; Wonpil	Hong Ji-sang; Lee Woo-min 'Collapsedone'	4:05
12.	"I Need Somebody" (누군가 필요해)	mr.cho; Young K	mr.cho; Young K; Jae Do-gi	mr.cho; Jae Do-gi	3:38
13.	"I'll Try" (노력해볼게요)	mr.cho; Wonpil	mr.cho; Wonpil	mr.cho	3:41
14.	"Colors" (Final Ver. [CD Only])	mr.cho; Day6	Hong Jung-pyo; mr.cho; Park Kun-woo; Day6	mr.cho; Jun Jung-hoon	4:16
15.	"Like That Sun" (태양처럼; Final Ver. [CD Only])	Frants; Day6	Frants; Day6	Frants	3:38
16.	"Out of My Mind" (이상하게 계속 이래; Final Ver. [CD Only])	Day6	Andrew Choi; 220; Day6	220	3:12
17.	"Habits" (버릇이 됐어; Final Ver. [CD Only])	mr.cho; Day6	mr.cho; Park Kun-woo; Day6	mr.cho; Park Kun-woo; Day6	3:25
18.	"Freely" (Free하게; Final Ver. [CD Only])	Naru; Day6	Naru; Day6	Naru	3:08
Total length:					66:37

== Charts ==
Chart (2017)	Peak position
South Korean Albums (Gaon)	2
