= Daydream (Day6 EP) =

EP by Day6
- Released: March 30, 2016
- Recorded: 2016
- Genres: K-pop; pop rock
- Length: 21:46
- Language: Korean
- Labels: JYP Entertainment; KT Music
- Producer: J. Y. Park "The Asiansoul"

Day6 chronology
The Day (2015)	Daydream (2016)	Sunrise (2017)

Singles from Daydream
- 1. "Letting Go" Released: March 30, 2016

Music video
- "Letting Go" on YouTube

Daydream is the second extended play by South Korean pop rock band Day6. It was released by JYP Entertainment on March 30, 2016. The extended play features six original tracks.

== Track listing ==
No.	Title	Lyrics	Music	Arrangement	Length
1.	"First Time"	Day6	Hong Ji-sang; Lee Woo-min; Day6	Hong Ji-sang; Lee Woo-min	03:19
2.	"Blood"	Jae; Young K	Andrew Choi; 220; Jae; Young K	220	03:28
3.	"Letting Go" (놓아 놓아 놓아)	Young K; Wonpil	Hong Ji-sang; Lee Woo-min; Young K; Wonpil	Hong Ji-sang; Lee Woo-min	03:50
4.	"Sing Me"	Young K; Wonpil	Nuplay; Neil Nallas; Walter Pok; Day6	Nuplay	03:33
5.	"Wish" (바래)	Frants; Sungjin; Young K; Wonpil	Frants; Sungjin; Young K; Wonpil	Frants	04:04
6.	"Hunt"	Frants; Young K; Wonpil	Frants; Young K; Wonpil	Frants	03:26
Total length:					21:46

== Charts ==
Chart (2016)	Peak position
South Korean Weekly Album Chart (Gaon)	4
South Korean Monthly Album Chart (Gaon)	15
US World Albums (Billboard)	6

== Sales ==
Region	Sales
South Korea (Gaon)	13,723

== Release history ==
Region	Date	Format	Label
South Korea	March 30, 2016	Digital download; CD	JYP Entertainment; KT Music
Worldwide	March 30, 2016	Digital download	JYP Entertainment
