= X Lovers =

American pop duo

- Genres: Alternative
- Years active: 2017–2021
- Labels: RCA, Visionary Records
- Members: London Jackson; Jacob Ames
- Website: www.xloversmusic.com

X Lovers was a Los Angeles-based pop music duo consisting of London Jackson and Jacob Chatelain.

== Early life ==
London (guitar, vocals, songwriting) and Jacob (production) met as fourth-grade classmates in Nevada City, California. They began playing music together as children, citing Green Day and Kanye West as major inspirations, and formed a punk band called Opposition.

They continued to write and perform through their school years, organizing and playing their own house and street shows.

By the time they graduated from high school they had played over 150 shows and saved enough money to move to Los Angeles and launch their professional career.

== Career ==
Settling in Los Feliz, they continued writing and recording. They gained notoriety in 2018 for producing two tracks, "Human" and "Would I," for Maggie Lindemann and posting their own acoustic originals and covers on SoundCloud.

In late 2018, Logic manager Chris Zarou's Visionary Records signed them to a record deal in conjunction with RCA Records. They were Visionary's first signing after Visionary partnered with Sony Music/RCA.

Through 2019 the duo released a series of singles. "Colder When It Rains" netted more than half a million streams in less than a week upon release and two million total on Spotify. "King of Capulet" had nearly as many. The video for "Sweatshirt" premiered on The Fader on 5 November.

They released their first album, the eight-song virgin, on Visionary/RCA on November 22, 2019.

X Lovers released their second album, Mad World, on 10/23/20. The album featured "Haunt You", a collaboration with Chloe Moriondo; the song was chosen for the SiriusXM Hits 1 Artist Series and went on to be the bands biggest release. X Lovers has since obtained hundreds of millions of streams across platforms, had multiple hits across Asia and played national sold out tours with the likes of Tate McCrae, Chelsea Cutler, and Alexander23.

== Hiatus ==
X Lovers announced an indefinite hiatus in the spring of 2021 for unannounced reasons. London and Jacob remain close friends and still collaborate on projects from time to time.

On June 10, 2022, X Lovers released an EP consisting of five demos that were never released before disbanding.
