= Congratulations (Day6 song) =

2015 single by Day6

Single by Day6

from the album The Day
- Released: September 7, 2015
- Recorded: 2015
- Genre: K-pop
- Length: 3:49
- Label: JYP
- Songwriters: Sungjin; Young K; Wonpil; Dowoon; Jae; Junhyeok
- Producers: Hong Ji-sang; Lee Woo-min; Sungjin; Young K; Wonpil; Dowoon; Jae; Junhyeok

Day6 singles chronology
"Congratulations" (2015)	"Letting Go" (2016)

Music video
- "Congratulations" on YouTube

"Congratulations" is a song recorded by K-pop boy band Day6 for their debut EP The Day. The song served as the group's debut single in September 2015 and was the first and last single to include Junhyeok before his departure in February 27, 2016.

== Background and release ==
In 2013, JYP Entertainment initially announced the debut of a five-member band called 5Live, composed of Sungjin, Jae, Young K, Junhyeok, and Wonpil. In July 2015, drummer Dowoon joined the line-up, and the band was renamed Day6. On September 7, 2015, both "Congratulations" and their first EP The Day were released.

== Music video ==
The music video shows a man remembering the memories with his beloved lover and struggling after the break up. It features actors Choi Woo-sik, Jang Hee-ryung and Kang Yoon-je who are in a love triangle. The music video was directed by Naive Creative Production.

== Composition ==
"Congratulations" lyrics were written by all Day6 members and composed by Day6, Hong Ji-sang and Lee Woo-min. The song is composed in the key E-flat Major and has 180 beats per minute and a running time of 3 minutes and 49 seconds. The song is described as honestly expressing the last words to a lover who has another person.

== Charts ==
=== Weekly charts ===
Weekly chart performance
Chart (2015-2024)	Peak position
South Korea (Circle)	28
US World Digital Songs (Billboard)	6

=== Monthly charts ===
Chart (October 2024)	Peak position
South Korea (Circle)	33

=== Year-end charts ===
2024 year-end chart performance for "Congratulations"
Chart (2024)	Position
South Korea (Circle)	118

2025 year-end chart performance for "Congratulations"
Chart (2025)	Position
South Korea (Circle)	90

== Sales ==
Country	Sales
South Korea (digital)	48,787

== Release history ==
Release history
Region	Date	Format	Label
Various	September 7, 2015	Digital download; streaming	JYP
