= Day6 =

South Korean rock band

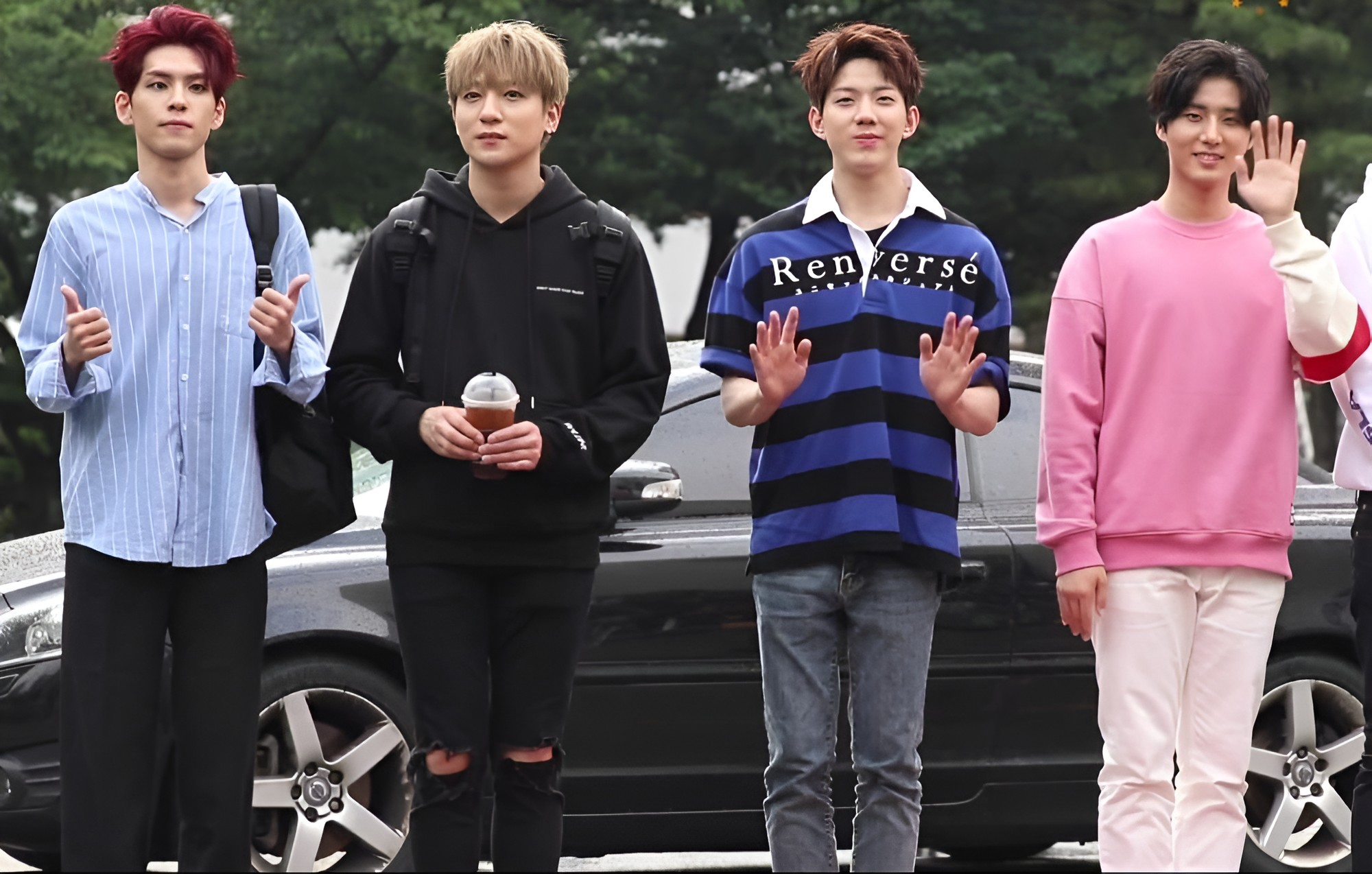
- Day6 in June 2018; From left to right: Wonpil, Sungjin, Dowoon, and Young K

Background information
- Also known as: 5Live (2014–2015)
- Origin: Seoul, South Korea
- Genres: Pop rock; K-pop; pop punk; power pop
- Years active: 2015–present
- Labels: Studio J; Warner Japan
- Spinoffs: Day6 (Even of Day)
- Members: Sungjin; Young K; Wonpil; Dowoon
- Past members: Jae; Junhyeok
- Website: day6.jype.com

Day6 (Korean: 데이식스; stylized in all caps) is a South Korean pop rock band under the label JYP Entertainment. The group debuted on September 7, 2015, with the EP The Day, which peaked at No.2 on Billboard's World Album Chart a week following its release. The band consists of four members: Sungjin, Young K, Wonpil, and Dowoon. Day6 was originally a six-member band; Junhyeok departed on February 27, 2016, and Jae departed on December 31, 2021. All of the Day6 members are heavily, deeply involved in writing, composing, and producing the band's music.

In 2017, the band released two songs every month of the year for a project named Every Day6. By the end of the project, 25 songs were added to their discography, with genres ranging from hard rock and upbeat sing-a-longs to mellow ballads. Their first full-length album, Sunrise, consisted of songs released in the first half of the Every Day6 project. It was number 14 on Billboard's "The 25 Greatest K-Pop Albums of the 2010s: Staff List", and the project kick-off song "I Wait" was placed No.81 on Billboard's "The 100 Greatest K-Pop Songs of the 2010s: Staff List".

== History ==
=== 2014–2016: Formation, debut and Jun-hyeok's departure ===
JYP Entertainment initially announced the debut of a five-member band called 5Live, composed of Sungjin, Jae, Young K, Junhyeok, and Wonpil. In 2013, the band began promotions by appearing on the fourth episode of Mnet's reality survival program Who is Next: Win and releasing a song titled "Lovely Girl" as part of the original soundtrack of the 2013 TV series Bel Ami.

In mid-2015, drummer Dowoon joined the line-up, and the band was renamed Day6. Day6 released their debut EP, The Day, with the lead single "Congratulations" on September 7, 2015, marking their debut. The album charted at No.2 on Billboard's World Album Chart a week following its release. Day6 held their first live concert D-Day for 2 nights on November 21–22, 2015 at YES24 MUVhall. Aside from performing songs from their debut album, the band also did multiple covers and played some unreleased materials of theirs. On October 18, 2015, Day6 held their first overseas showcase in Taiwan, which was also their first overseas schedule, at ATT Show Box. On December 5, 2015, Day6 held their first overseas fanmeeting in Singapore at the Marina Bay Sands Convention Centre.

On February 27, 2016, JYP Entertainment stated that Junhyeok had departed from the band for personal reasons and terminated his contract with the company. Day6 continued as a five-member band. On March 30, 2016, Day6 released their second EP, Daydream, with the lead single "Letting Go". On March 31, Day6 made their official stage debut on the music program M Countdown, six months after their initial debut. Following the release, the band held their second live concert Dream for 2 nights on May 28–29, 2016 at YES24 Live Hall, and one night overseas in Bangkok, Thailand at the Thunder Dome.

=== 2017: Every Day6 project ===
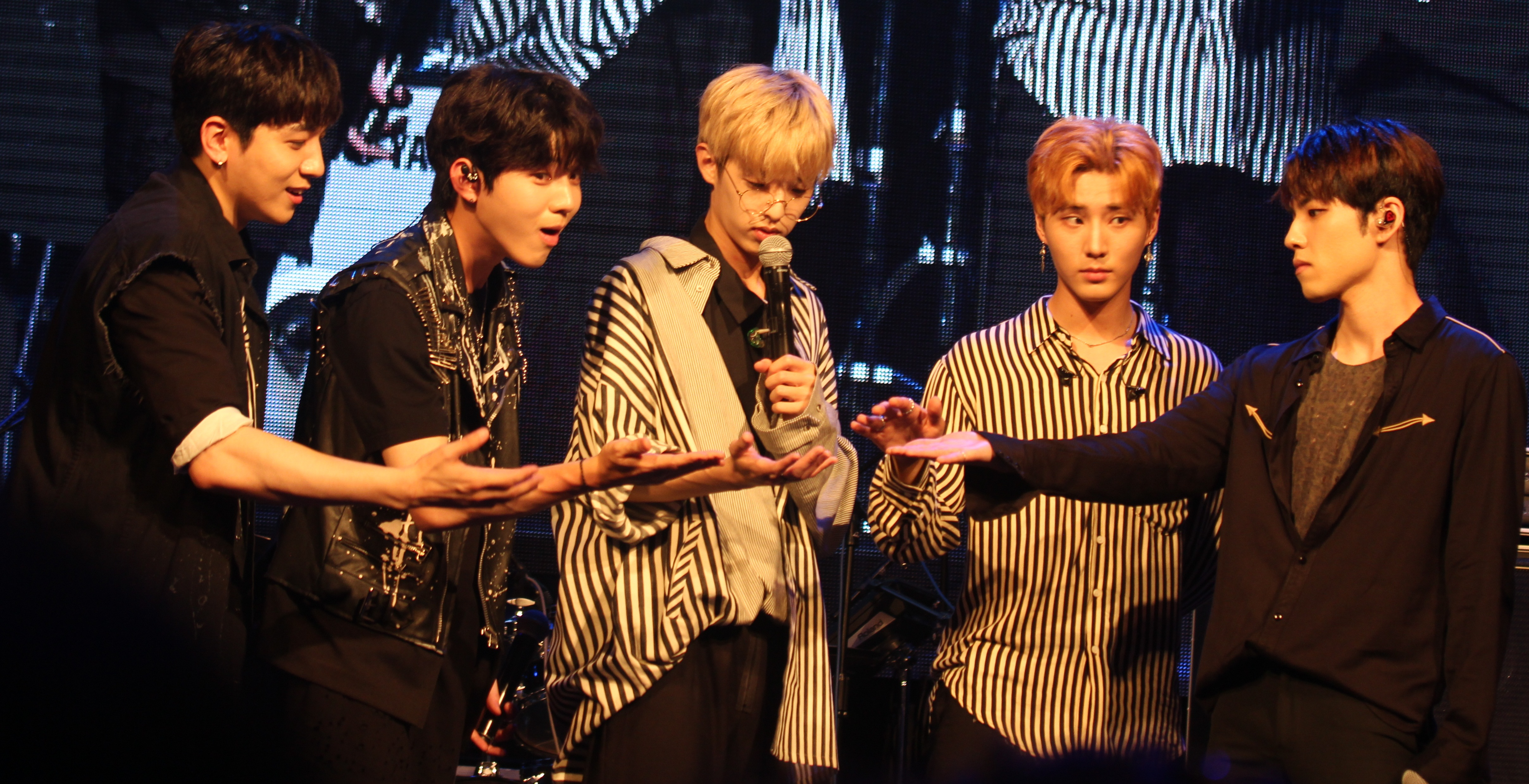
Day6 at Live & Meet in Taiwan, July 2017

On December 29, 2016, Day6 announced their upcoming monthly project in 2017 titled Every Day6, in which the band would release two songs every month on the sixth and hold concerts over the weekend prior to the song's release.

Day6 released their first monthly single with the release of lead single "I Wait" and the sidetrack "Goodbye Winter" on January 6, 2017. Their second monthly single was released with the lead single "You Were Beautiful" and the sidetrack "My Day" on February 6.

Their third monthly single with the lead single "How Can I Say" and sidetrack "I Would" was released on March 6. They also promoted on the music program M Countdown on March 9. Their fourth monthly single consisting of the lead single "I'm Serious" and sidetrack "Say Wow" was released on April 6. They also promoted on M Countdown the same day. Their fifth monthly single was released on May 8, with the lead single "Dance Dance" and sidetrack "Man in a Movie".

In June 2017, Day6 released their first full-length album, Sunrise, with a total of 14 tracks. It consists of the releases from January to May, the rebooted version of "Letting Go", the final version of "Congratulations", and two new tracks: "I Smile" (the lead single of the album) and "Lean On Me". Day6 also announced their official fanclub name, "My Day", the same day.

Their July single consisting of the lead single "Hi Hello" and sidetrack "Be Lazy" was released on July 6. Their August single consisting of the lead single "What Can I Do" and sidetrack "Whatever!" was released on August 7. Their September single with the lead single "I Loved You" and sidetrack "I'll Remember" was released on September 6. Day6 originally would release their October single on October 7 and later installment to release on September 29, which consists of the lead single "When You Love Someone" and the sidetrack "I Need Somebody". The music videos of their August, September, and October singles were a three-part story about high school friendship and love.

Day6 held their North American meet and greet tour, Day6 Live & Meet in North America 2017, hosted by SubKulture Entertainment. The tour started in Los Angeles on October 20, Austin on October 22, New York on October 24, Detroit on October 27, and stopped in Toronto on October 29.

Their November single consisting of the lead single "All Alone" and sidetrack "Pouring" was released on November 6. On November 28, JYP Entertainment announced the band's first nationwide tour in 2018, Every Day6 Concert Nationwide Tour. The tour started in Busan on January 20–21, Daegu on January 27 and stopped in Daejeon on February 10.

On December 6, Day6 official concluded their monthly project with the release of their second full-length album, Moonrise. The album contained the previous releases from July to November, the lead single "I Like You", two sidetracks ("Better Better" and "I'll Try"), and the final versions of the B-sides from their debut EP The Day.

=== 2018: Youth series, Japanese debut and first world tour ===
Day6 official announced the recruitment of their first generation fan club from January 5 to 25.

Day6 made their official debut in Japan on March 14 with their first Japanese single, "If (Mata Aetara)". The single also serves as theme song for the Japanese drama Repeat. The music video for the single was released on February 2.

Day6 held their Every Day6 Finale Concert - The Best Moments on March 3 and 4 in the Olympic Hall.

In April 2018, Day6 announced their first Japanese concert, Day6 1st Live in Japan 'The Best Day' on June 13 at Tsutaya O-East in Tokyo.

In May 2018, it was announced that Day6 would release their second Japanese single, "Stop the Rain", on July 25, which was produced by Japanese guitarist Ubukata Shinichi (member of Ellegarden and Nothing's Carved In Stone).

In June 2018, Day6 released their first greatest hits album in Japan, The Best Day. Which is composed of the band's previous Korean singles and three new-version tracks: "Congratulations" (English Ver.), "I Wait" (Japanese Ver.), and "You Were Beautiful" (English Ver.). On June 26, Day6 released their third EP Shoot Me: Youth Part 1. The EP contains seven tracks, with the lead single titled "Shoot Me". The second part, Remember Us: Youth Part 2, was released on December 10 with the lead single "days gone by". On October 17, 2018, between the release of the two parts, their first Japanese studio album Unlock was released. Day6 went on their first world tour, titled Youth, subsequently performing in 24 cities in Asia, Australia, North America and Europe from June 22, 2018, to January 29, 2019.

=== 2019–2021: The Book of Us series, second world tour, first sub-unit, and Jae's departure ===
On January 10, 2019, the Day6 YouTube account announced that recruitment for their second-generation fan club would begin that month. Day6 released their fifth extended play The Book of Us: Gravity on July 15, 2019. They received their first-ever music show win on July 24. They embarked on their second world tour Gravity on August 9. On October 22, they released their third Korean-language studio album, The Book of Us: Entropy. On December 4, they released their second compilation album The Best Day2.

On April 27, 2020, JYP Entertainment announced that Day6 would be releasing a new album titled The Book of Us: The Demon on May 11. The day before the album's scheduled release, JYP Entertainment announced that Day6 would be taking a temporary hiatus to focus on their health. Although Day6 is temporarily halting group activities, the band still released their EP The Book of Us: The Demon on May 11 at 6 p.m. KST. The lead single "Zombie" debuted at No. 8 on Melon's realtime chart at 7 p.m. KST and rose as high as No. 4 at 1 a.m. KST on May 12. "Zombie" also went up to No. 1 spot after debuting No. 2 in Bugs. In addition, all seven B-side tracks from the album have been charting in the top 100 on Melon, Bugs, and Genie since the album's release. In August 2020, JYP Entertainment announced Day6's first subunit, Even of Day, composed of Young K, Wonpil and Dowoon, which debuted on August 31 with their EP The Book of Us: Gluon, which produced the single "Where the Sea Sleeps." Even of Day partook in the first segment of web music show Secret Atelier where they released a single, "So, This Is Love," on January 15, 2021, as a result of the show. On January 24, Even of Day held their first online concert, Online Party Night: The Arcane Salon.

It was announced in February 26 that Day6 would make a full group comeback in April 2021. On March 8, 2021, Sungjin announced during his a V Live broadcast that he would be enlisting for his mandatory military service on the same day, having already recorded for the upcoming album. Day6 released their seventh extended play The Book of Us: Negentropy and its lead single "You Make Me" on April 19; the album marked the final installment of The Book of Us series. Due to Sungjin's military enlistment, the group decided that they would not be doing album promotions for The Book of Us: Negentropy. On July 5, 2021, Even of Day returned with their second EP, Right Through Me and its lead single of the same name. Young K debuted as Day6's second soloist with his first extended play, Eternal, on September 6. He also enlisted in the military on October 12, where he served in KATUSA. Dowoon debuted as Day6's third soloist with his first digital single, "Out of the Blue", on September 27, which is a duet with Song Heejin. On December 31, 2021, Jae announced via Twitter that he would take a hiatus from his promotions as a member of the band. The same day, JYPE announced that he would be permanently leaving the band and ending his exclusive contract with JYP Entertainment for personal reasons.

=== 2022–2023: Military service ===
Dowoon became the third member of the band to enlist in the military on January 17, 2022. On February 7, 2022, Wonpil debuted as Day6's fourth soloist with his first studio album, Pilmography. He enlisted as a member of the Republic of Korea Navy on March 28. On September 6, 2022, it was confirmed that Sungjin, who would be the first member to be discharged from the military, would retire from military service on September 7. On September 26, 2022, all members of Day6 renewed their contracts with JYP Entertainment. On April 11, 2023, Young K became the second member to be discharged from military service as a KATUSA soldier. On July 16, 2023, Dowoon was discharged from military service as an Army band soldier, becoming the third member to be discharged from military service. On November 27, 2023, Wonpil became the fourth and last member to be discharged from military service as a Deckhand in the Naval Operations Command's 7th Mobility Squadron. Day6 marked the group's complete return from the military with a Christmas concert at Korea University Hwajeong Tiger Dome held from December 22, 2023, to December 24, 2023.

=== 2024–present: Return from military, Fourever, Band Aid and The Decade ===
On February 16, 2024, it was announced that Day6 had been filming a music video for a March comeback, marking the group's first comeback since starting their military service in 2021. Day6's eighth EP Fourever and its lead single " Welcome to the Show" were released on March 18, following which they sold out all three days of their first 360-degree concert totalling 33,000 seats held at Jamsil Indoor Stadium in Seoul from April 12, 2024, to April 14, 2024.

On April 10, 2024, Day6 won the Best Band Award at the inaugural 'Asia Star Entertainer Awards 2024' (ASEA 2024) held at K Arena Yokohama, Japan.

Day6 held their third fanmeeting 'I Need My Day', at the Jamsil Indoor Stadium from June 21, 2024 to June 23, 2024.

Day6 released their ninth EP Band Aid on September 2, 2024. The EP was supported by the lead single "Melt Down".

On December 27, 2024, Day6 won their first daesang award since their debut at the Korea Grand Music Awards held at the Inspire Arena in Incheon, South Korea. The band brought home the 2024 Grand Performer Award, along with Best Band and Best Song awards.

Day6 made history by being the first K-band to ever perform at the Gocheok Sky Dome for their 2024 Christmas concert, The Present 2024.

Day6 released a digital single, entitled "Maybe Tomorrow", on May 7, 2025. The digital single consisted of two tracks, including the title track "Maybe Tomorrow".

On May 9, 2025, Day6 became the first K-band to perform at the KSPO Dome for the final stop of their third world tour, Forever Young: Finale. The concert set history with the largest audience in history, with a total of 96,000 audience members over the span of the 6-day concert.

On June 18, 2025, it was announced that the group would be dropping their music road movie, "6DAYS" in August. The movie was released domestically, followed by an international release. The movie sold 30,000 tickets within the first four days of its release in South Korea, and surpassed 40,000 during the second weekend.

Day6 made history to be the first K-band to perform at the Goyang Stadium for their 10th anniversary tour. They had successfully sold out their concert as well.

The group released their fourth studio album, The Decade on September 5, 2025. They released their first holiday single "Lovin' the Christmas" on December 15. The group held a 360-degree special concert for three nights at KSPO Dome titled "The Present" 2025, between December 19 to 21.

== Members ==
List of members and roles.

- Sungjin (성진) – leader, vocals, guitars (2015–present)
- Young K (영케이) – bass, vocals (2015–present)
- Wonpil (원필) – keyboards, synthesizers, programming, vocals (2015–present)
- Dowoon (도운) – drums, percussion, vocals (2015–present)

Former members

- Jae (제이) – guitars, vocals (2015–2021)
- Junhyeok (준혁) – keyboards, vocals (2015–2016)

== Discography ==
- Sunrise (2017)
- Moonrise (2017)
- Unlock (2018)
- The Book of Us: Entropy (2019)
- The Decade (2025)

== Tours and concerts ==
=== Headlining concerts ===
- Day6 Live Concert "D-Day" (2015)
- Day6 Live Concert "Dream" (2016)
- Every Day6 Concerts (2017–2018)
- Day6 1st Live in Japan "The Best Day" (2018)
- Day6 Christmas Special Concert "The Present" (2018, 2019, 2023, 2024, 2025)
- Day6 Welcome to the Show Concert (2024)

=== Headlining tours ===
- Day6 First World Tour "Youth" (2018–2019)
- Day6 2nd Live Tour in Japan (2018)
- Day6 2nd World Tour "Gravity" (2019–2020)
- Day6 3rd World Tour "Forever Young" (2024–2025)
- Day6 10th Anniversary Tour "The Decade" (2025–2026)

== Awards and nominations ==
Name of the award ceremony, year presented, category, nominee of the award, and the result of the nomination
Award ceremony	Year	Category	Nominee / Work	Result	Ref.
Asia Artist Awards	2020	Male Singer Popularity Award	Day6	Nominated	
Asia Artist Awards	2024	Best Band Award	Day6	Won	
Asia Artist Awards	2024	Best Artist Award	Day6	Won	
Asia Artist Awards	2024	Album of the Year (Daesang)	Fourever	Won	
Asia Star Entertainer Awards	2024	Best Band Award	Day6	Won	
Brand of the Year Awards	2020	Idol Band	Day6	Won	
Brand of the Year Awards	2021	Band	Day6	Won	
Brand of the Year Awards	2024	Band	Day6	Won	
D Awards	2025	Delights Blue Label	Day6	Won	
D Awards	2025	Best Band	Day6	Won	
Golden Disc Awards	2019	Album of the Year	Shoot Me: Youth Part 1	Nominated	
Golden Disc Awards	2025	Best Band	Day6	Won	
Golden Disc Awards	2025	Most Popular Artist – Male	Day6	Nominated	
Golden Disc Awards	2025	Digital Song Bonsang	"Welcome to the Show"	Won	
Golden Disc Awards	2025	Digital Daesang (Song of the Year)	"Welcome to the Show"	Nominated	
Genie Music Awards	2018	Song of the Year	"Shoot Me"	Nominated	
Genie Music Awards	2018	Band Music Award	"Shoot Me"	Won	
Genie Music Awards	2018	Genie Music Popularity Award	Day6	Nominated	
Genie Music Awards	2019	Best Band Performance	"Time of Our Life"	Won	
Korea Grand Music Awards	2024	Best Band	Day6	Won	
Korea Grand Music Awards	2024	Best Song 10	Day6	Won	
Korea Grand Music Awards	2024	Grand Performer	Day6	Won	
Melon Music Awards	2017	Best Rock Performance	"You Were Beautiful"	Nominated	
Melon Music Awards	2018	Best Rock Performance	"I Like You"	Nominated	
Melon Music Awards	2019	Best Rock Performance	"Days Gone By"	Nominated	
Melon Music Awards	2020	Best Rock Performance	"Zombie"	Nominated	
Melon Music Awards	2024	Top 10 Artist	Day6	Won	
Melon Music Awards	2024	Artist of the Year	Day6	Nominated	
Melon Music Awards	2024	Best Male Group	Day6	Nominated	
Melon Music Awards	2024	Kakao Favorite Star Award	Day6	Nominated	
Melon Music Awards	2024	Album of the Year	Fourever	Nominated	
Melon Music Awards	2024	Millions Top 10	Band Aid	Won	
Mnet Asian Music Awards	2016	Best Band Performance	"Letting Go"	Nominated	
Mnet Asian Music Awards	2016	Song of the Year	"Letting Go"	Nominated	
Mnet Asian Music Awards	2017	Best Band Performance	"I Smile"	Nominated	
Mnet Asian Music Awards	2017	Song of the Year	"I Smile"	Nominated	
Mnet Asian Music Awards	2018	Best Band Performance	"Shoot Me"	Nominated	
Mnet Asian Music Awards	2018	Song of the Year	"Shoot Me"	Nominated	
Mnet Asian Music Awards	2019	Best Band Performance	"Time of Our Life"	Nominated	
Mnet Asian Music Awards	2020	Best Band Performance	"Zombie"	Won	
Mnet Asian Music Awards	2020	Song of the Year	"Zombie"	Nominated	
Mnet Asian Music Awards	2020	Worldwide Fans' Choice	Day6	Nominated	
Mnet Asian Music Awards	2021	Best Band Performance	"You Make Me"	Nominated	
Mnet Asian Music Awards	2024	Best Band Performance	"Welcome to the Show"	Nominated	
Mnet Asian Music Awards	2024	Worldwide Fans' Choice Male	Day6	Nominated	
Mnet Asian Music Awards	2025	Best Band Performance	"Maybe Tomorrow"	Won	
Seoul Music Awards	2016	Day6	Bonsang Award	Nominated	
Seoul Music Awards	2016	Day6	New Artist Award	Nominated	
Seoul Music Awards	2016	Day6	Popularity Award	Nominated	
Seoul Music Awards	2025	Day6	Main Prize (Bonsang)	Nominated	
Seoul Music Awards	2025	Day6	Popularity Award	Nominated	
Seoul Music Awards	2025	Day6	K-Wave Special Award	Nominated	
Seoul Music Awards	2025	Day6	K-pop World Choice – Group	Nominated	

=== State honors ===
Name of country, year given, and name of honor
Country	Organization	Year	Honor or Award	Ref.
South Korea	Korean Popular Culture and Arts Awards (Note: Honors are given at the Korean Popular Culture and Arts Awards, arranged by the Korea Creative Content Agency and hosted by the Ministry of Culture, Sports and Tourism. They are awarded to those who have contributed to the arts and South Korea's pop culture.)	2024	Minister of Culture, Sports and Tourism Commendation	

=== Listicles ===
Name of publisher, year listed, name of listicle, and placement
Publisher	Year	Listicle	Placement	Ref.
Forbes	2025	Korea Power Celebrity	37th	
Forbes	2025	K-Idol of the Year 30	24th	
