= Sunrise (Day6 album) =

Studio album by Day6
- Released: June 7, 2017
- Recorded: 2017
- Studio: JYPE Studios
- Genres: Pop rock; pop punk; alternative rock
- Length: 50:50
- Language: Korean
- Labels: JYP Entertainment; Genie Music
- Producer: J. Y. Park "The Asiansoul"

Day6 chronology
| Daydream (2016) | Sunrise (2017) | Moonrise (2017) |

Singles from Sunrise
- 1. "I Wait" Released: January 6, 2017; 2. "You Were Beautiful" Released: February 6, 2017; 3. "How Can I Say" Released: March 6, 2017; 4. "I'm Serious" Released: April 6, 2017; 5. "Dance Dance" Released: May 8, 2017; 6. "I Smile" Released: June 7, 2017

Sunrise is the first studio album by South Korean pop rock band Day6. It was released by JYP Entertainment on June 7, 2017. This album features 14 tracks which consists of all 10 tracks that were previously released from January to May 2017 through Every Day6, tracks from Every Day6 June, rebooted version of "Letting Go", and final version of "Congratulations".

== Track listing ==
| No. | Title | Lyrics | Music | Arrangement | Length |
|---|---|---|---|---|---|
| 1. | "Lean on Me" (오늘은 내게) | Young K; Wonpil; Sungjin | Hong Ji-sang; Lee Woo-min 'Collapsedone'; Swanthewhitepig; Young K; Wonpil; Jae; Sungjin | Hong Ji-sang; Lee Woo-min 'Collapsedone'; Swanthewhitepig | 03:29 |
| 2. | "I Smile" (반드시 웃는다) | Young K; Wonpil | Hong Ji-sang; Lee Woo-min 'Collapsedone'; Sungjin; Young K; Wonpil | Hong Ji-sang; Lee Woo-min 'Collapsedone' | 03:47 |
| 3. | "Man in a Movie" | Young K | Hong Ji-sang; Sungjin; Young K; Wonpil | Hong Ji-sang | 03:46 |
| 4. | "I Wait" (아 왜) | Young K | Hong Ji-sang; Lee Woo-min; Jae; Young K; Wonpil | Hong Ji-sang; Lee Woo-min | 03:38 |
| 5. | "How Can I Say" (어떻게 말해) | Young K; Wonpil | Hong Ji-sang; Lee Woo-min 'Collapsedone'; Sungjin; Young K; Wonpil; Jae | Hong Ji-sang; Lee Woo-min 'Collapsedone' | 03:21 |
| 6. | "Letting Go" (놓아 놓아 놓아; Rebooted Version) | Young K; Wonpil | Hong Ji-sang; Lee Woo-min; Young K; Wonpil | Hong Ji-sang; Lee Woo-min | 04:11 |
| 7. | "I Would" (그럴 텐데) | Young K | Hong Ji-sang; Lee Woo-min 'Collapsedone'; Jae; Young K; Wonpil | Hong Ji-sang | 03:43 |
| 8. | "Goodbye Winter" (겨울이 간다) | Sungjin; Jae; Young K; YUE; Cha Il-hoon | Sungjin; Jae; Young K; YUE; Cha Il-hoon | YUE; Cha Il-hoon; Yoon Eun-suk | 03:07 |
| 9. | "I'm Serious" (장난 아닌데) | Young K; Sungjin; Wonpil | Hong Ji-sang; Lee Woo-min 'Collapsedone'; Wonpil; Sungjin | Hong Ji-sang; Lee Woo-min 'Collapsedone' | 03:14 |
| 10. | "Say Wow" | Young K | Hong Ji-sang; Wonpil; Young K | Hong Ji-sang | 03:09 |
| 11. | "Dance Dance" | Young K | Hong Ji-sang; Lee Woo-min 'Collapsedone'; Day6 | Hong Ji-sang; Lee Woo-min 'Collapsedone' | 03:43 |
| 12. | "My Day" | Young K | Mr. Cho; Joo-hyo; Young K; Wonpil | Mr. Cho; Joo-hyo; Young K; Wonpil; Dowoon | 03:00 |
| 13. | "You Were Beautiful" (예뻤어) | Young K | Hong Ji-sang; Lee Woo-min; Young K; Wonpil | Hong Ji-sang; Lee Woo-min | 04:43 |
| 14. | "Congratulations" (Final Version) | Day6 | Hong Ji-sang; Lee Woo-min; Lim Jun-hyeok; Young K; Sungjin; Dowoon; Jae; Wonpil | Hong Ji-sang; Lee Woo-min | 03:47 |
| Total length: | | | | | 50:50 |

== Charts ==
| Chart (2017) | Peak position |
|---|---|
| Japanese Weekly Album Chart (Oricon) | 164 |
| South Korean Weekly Album Chart (Gaon) | 4 |
| US World Albums (Billboard) | 6 |

== Accolades ==
Decade-end lists
| Publication | Accolade | Rank / Year | Ref. |
|---|---|---|---|
| Billboard | The 25 Greatest K-Pop Albums of the 2010s: Staff List | 14 | |

== Sales ==
| Region | Sales |
|---|---|
| South Korea (Gaon) | 48,935 |
| Japan (Oricon) | 585 |

== Release history ==
| Region | Date | Format | Label |
|---|---|---|---|
| South Korea | June 7, 2017 | Digital download; CD | JYP Entertainment; Genie Music |
| Worldwide | June 7, 2017 | Digital download | JYP Entertainment |
