= Sungjin =

South Korean singer (born 1993)

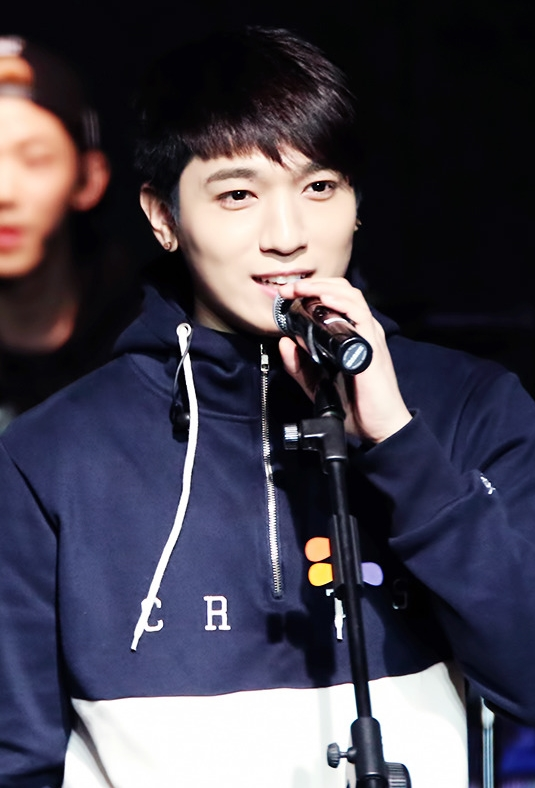
- Park in 2016
- Born: Park Sung-jin; January 16, 1993 (age 33); Busan, South Korea
- Occupations: Musician; singer; songwriter; guitarist; radio host
- Musical career
- Genres: K-pop; rock; pop
- Instruments: Vocals; guitar
- Years active: 2015–present
- Label: JYP
- Member of: Day6; JYP Nation

Korean name
- Hangul: 박성진
- Hanja: 朴晟鎭
- RR: Bak Seongjin
- MR: Pak Sŏngjin

Park Sung-jin (Korean: 박성진; born January 16, 1993), known mononymously as Sungjin, is a South Korean musician, singer, songwriter, and guitarist. He is best known as the leader, guitarist and vocalist of South Korean pop rock band Day6.

== Early life ==
Park Sungjin was born on January 16, 1993, in Busan, South Korea. He has an older sister. He attended Kyungnam High School, which is well-known for their baseball team.

== Career ==
=== 2009–2015: Pre-debut ===
Park was known to have performed in school festivals prior to training and debut. In 2009, Park won the Daesang (Grand Prize) in the 2009 CMB Chin Chin Youth Festival. He also made an appearance in the famous variety show, Star King in the same year. He revealed that he had received casting offers from five companies in the program. He then auditioned and passed his audition for JYP, and began his trainee life with JYP.

In September 2013, Park appeared in the fourth episode of WIN: Who is Next? as a part of JYP's vocalist team alongside his eventual Day6 bandmates. He also appeared as a contestant in Hidden Singer 2 on December 15, 2013, in which he was introduced as the JYP trainee and lead vocalist for an upcoming rookie group.

Park was one of the members for 5live, a group which was originally planned to debut in 2014. However, their debut was delayed.

=== 2015–present: Day6, solo activities and solo debut ===
On September 7, 2015, Park debuted as the leader of Day6. The group released their debut EP, The Day, with the lead single "Congratulations".

On March 14, 2018, he made his Japanese debut as a member of Day6 with their Japanese single "If ～また逢えたら～".

On October 25, 2022, Park made his first broadcast appearance through EBS FM Night Radio hosted by Pentagon's Shinwon after being discharged from the military.

Park became the new weekly radio host for KBS Station Z, starting from November 2, 2022.

He started his personal YouTube channel in December 2022.

On October 16, 2024, it was announced that he would make his solo debut with a full-length album entitled 30. The album was released on November 5, 2024. He also held his first solo concert from November 8, 2024 to November 10, 2024 in Kwangwoon University Donghae Arts Center.

== Personal life ==
On March 8, 2021, Park announced his enlistment through V Live Broadcast. He served as the drill instructor during his military service. He was discharged on September 7, 2022.

== Discography ==
=== Studio albums ===
Title	Album details	Peak chart positions	Sales
Title	Album details	KOR	Sales
30	Released: November 5, 2024; Label: JYP Entertainment; Formats: CD, digital download, streaming	7	KOR: 64,106

=== Singles ===
Title	Year	Peak chart positions	Album
Title	Year	KOR	Album
"Check Pattern"	2024	152	30

=== Other appearances ===
List of non-single guest appearances, showing year released and album name
Title	Year	Album
"넌 내게 반했어 (with No Brain, Dowoon)" (You Have A Crush on Me)	2026	No Brain 30th Anniversary Part.5

=== Songwriting credits ===
All song credits are sourced from the KOMCA database.

Year	Title	Artist(s)	Album	Lyrics		Music		Arrangement		Notes
Year	Title	Artist(s)	Album	Credited	With	Credited	With	Credited	With	Notes
2015	"Free하게" (Freely)	Day6	The Day	Yes	Naru, Jae, Young K, Wonpil, Dowoon, Lim Jun-hyeok	Yes	Naru, Jae, Young K, Wonpil, Dowoon, Lim Jun-hyeok	No	—N/a	
2015	"이상하게 계속 이래" (Out of My Mind)	Day6	The Day	Yes	Jae, Young K, Wonpil, Dowoon, Lim Jun-hyeok	Yes	Andrew Choi, 220, Jae, Young K, Wonpil, Dowoon, Lim Jun-hyeok	No	—N/a	
2015	"Congratulations"	Day6	The Day	Yes	Jae, Young K, Wonpil, Dowoon, Lim Jun-hyeok	Yes	Hong Ji-sang, Lee Woo-min, Jae, Young K, Wonpil, Dowoon, Lim Jun-hyeok	No	—N/a	
2015	"버릇이 됐어" (Habits)	Day6	The Day	Yes	Mr.Cho, Jae, Young K, Wonpil, Dowoon, Lim Jun-hyeok	Yes	Mr.Cho, Park Gun-woo, Jae, Young K, Wonpil, Dowoon, Lim Jun-hyeok	Yes	Mr.Cho, Park Gun-woo, Jae, Young K, Wonpil, Dowoon, Lim Jun-hyeok	
2015	"태양처럼" (Like That Sun)	Day6	The Day	Yes	Frants, Jae, Young K, Wonpil, Dowoon, Lim Jun-hyeok	Yes	Frants, Jae, Young K, Wonpil, Dowoon, Lim Jun-hyeok	No	—N/a	
2015	"Colors"	Day6	The Day	Yes	Mr.Cho, Jae, Young K, Wonpil, Dowoon, Lim Jun-hyeok	Yes	Mr.Cho, Jeon Jeong-hoon, Park Gun-woo, Jae, Young K, Wonpil, Dowoon, Lim Jun-hyeok	No	—N/a	
2015	"Eyeless"	Day6	Non-album singles	Yes	Jae, Young K, Wonpil, Dowoon, Lim Jun-hyeok	Yes	Jae, Young K, Wonpil, Dowoon, Lim Jun-hyeok	—N/a	—N/a	2015 Day6 1st Live Concert [D-Day]
2015	"You"	Day6	Non-album singles	Yes	Jae, Young K, Wonpil, Dowoon, Lim Jun-hyeok	Yes	Jae, Young K, Wonpil, Dowoon, Lim Jun-hyeok	—N/a	—N/a	2015 Day6 1st Live Concert [D-Day]
2015	"Pandora"	Day6	Non-album singles	Yes	Jae, Young K, Wonpil, Dowoon, Lim Jun-hyeok	Yes	Jae, Young K, Wonpil, Dowoon, Lim Jun-hyeok	—N/a	—N/a	2015 Day6 1st Live Concert [D-Day]
2016	"Sing Me"	Day6	Daydream	No	—N/a	Yes	Nuplay, Neil Nallas, Walter Pok, Jae, Young K, Wonpil, Dowoon	No	—N/a	
2016	"First Time"	Day6	Daydream	Yes	Jae, Young K, Wonpil, Dowoon	Yes	Hong Ji-sang, Lee Woo-min, Jae, Young K, Wonpil, Dowoon	No	—N/a	
2016	"바래" (Wish)	Day6	Daydream	Yes	Frants, Young K, Wonpil	Yes	Frants, Young K, Wonpil	No	—N/a	
2016	"I Can"	Day6	Non-album singles	Yes	Jae, Young K, Wonpil	No	—N/a	—N/a	—N/a	Day6 Live Concert 'Dream'
2016	"빠져가지고" (Stuck On You)	Up10tion	Burst	Yes	Daniel Kim, Young K, Wonpil	Yes	Daniel Kim, Young K, Wonpil	No	—N/a	
2017	"겨울이 간다" (Goodbye Winter)	Day6	Sunrise	Yes	Jae, Young K, Cha Il-hun, Yue	Yes	Jae, Young K, Cha Il-hun, Yue	No	—N/a	
2017	"어떻게 말해" (How Can I Say)	Day6	Sunrise	No	—N/a	Yes	Hong Ji-sang, Lee Woo-min, Jae, Young K, Wonpil	No	—N/a	
2017	"장난아닌데" (I'm Serious)	Day6	Sunrise	Yes	Young K, Wonpil	Yes	Hong Ji-sang, Lee Woo-min, Wonpil	No	—N/a	
2017	"Dance Dance"	Day6	Sunrise	No	—N/a	Yes	Hong Ji-sang, Lee Woo-min, Jae, Young K, Wonpil, Dowoon	No	—N/a	
2017	"Man In A Movie"	Day6	Sunrise	No	—N/a	Yes	Hong Ji-sang, Young K, Wonpil	No	—N/a	
2017	"오늘은내게" (Lean On Me)	Day6	Sunrise	Yes	Young K, Wonpil	Yes	Hong Ji-sang, Lee Woo-min, Yoo Swan, Jae, Young K, Wonpil	No	—N/a	
2017	"반드시웃는다" (I Smile)	Day6	Sunrise	No	—N/a	Yes	Hong Ji-sang, Lee Woo-min, Young K, Wonpil	No	—N/a	
2017	"Bueno"	Day6	Non-album singles	Yes	Jae, Young K	Yes	Jae, Young K	No	—N/a	Every Day6 Concert in July
2017	"Hi Hello"	Day6	Moonrise	No	—N/a	Yes	Hong J-sang, Lee Woo-min, Jae, Young K, Wonpil	No	—N/a	
2017	"놀래!" (Whatever!)	Day6	Moonrise	No	—N/a	Yes	Hong Ji-sang, Lee Woo-min, Jae, Young K, Wonpil	No	—N/a	
2017	"좋은걸 뭐 어떡해" (What Can I Do)	Day6	Moonrise	No	—N/a	Yes	Hong Ji-sang, Lee Woo-min, Jae, Young K, Wonpil	No	—N/a	
2017	"I Loved You"	Day6	Moonrise	No	—N/a	Yes	Hong Ji-sang, Lee Woo-min, Jae, Young K, Wonpil	No	—N/a	
2017	"남겨둘게" (I'll Remember)	Day6	Moonrise	No	—N/a	Yes	Hong Ji-sang, Lee Woo-min, Jae, Young K, Wonpil	No	—N/a	
2017	"그렇더라고요" (When You Love Someone)	Day6	Moonrise	No	—N/a	Yes	Hong Ji-sang, Lee Woo-min, Jae, Young K, Wonpil	No	—N/a	
2017	"혼자야" (All Alone)	Day6	Moonrise	No	—N/a	Yes	Hong Ji-sang, Jae, Young K, Wonpil	No	—N/a	
2017	"쏟아진다" (Pouring)	Day6	Moonrise	No	—N/a	Yes	Hong Ji-sang, Lee Woo-min, Jae, Young K, Wonpil	No	—N/a	
2017	"Better Better"	Day6	Moonrise	No	—N/a	Yes	Hong Ji-sang, Lee Woo-min, Jae, Young K, Wonpil	No	—N/a	
2017	"좋아합니다" (I Like You)	Day6	Moonrise	No	—N/a	Yes	Hong Ji-sang, Lee Woo-min, Jae, Young K, Wonpil	No	—N/a	
2018	"Raindrops"	Day6	Non-album singles	Yes	Park Young-gun, Jae	Yes	Park Young-gun, Jae	No	—N/a	Every Day6 Finale Concert 'The Best Moments'
2018	"Shoot Me"	Day6	Shoot Me: Youth Part 1	No	—N/a	Yes	Hong Ji-sang, Lee Woo-min, Jae, Young K, Wonpil	No	—N/a	
2018	"어쩌다보니" (Somehow)	Day6	Shoot Me: Youth Part 1	No	—N/a	Yes	Hong Ji-sang, Lee Woo-min, Jae, Young K, Wonpil	No	—N/a	
2018	"Feeling Good"	Day6	Shoot Me: Youth Part 1	No	—N/a	Yes	Hong Ji-sang, Jae, Young K, Wonpil	No	—N/a	
2018	"원하니까" (Still)	Day6	Shoot Me: Youth Part 1	No	—N/a	Yes	Hong Ji-sang, Lee Woo-min, Jae, Young K, Wonpil, Dowoon	No	—N/a	
2018	"Warning"	Day6	Shoot Me: Youth Part 1	No	—N/a	Yes	Hong Ji-sang, Jae, Young K, Wonpil	No	—N/a	
2018	"Baby It's Okay"	Day6	Unlock	No	—N/a	Yes	Hong Ji-sang, Lee Woo-min, Jae, Young K, Wonpil	No	—N/a	
2018	"If ~また逢えたら~" (If -Mata Aetara-)	Day6	Unlock	No	—N/a	Yes	Cha Il-hun, Yue, Young K, Wonpil	No	—N/a	
2018	"Stop The Rain"	Day6	Unlock	Yes	Jae, Young K	Yes	Shinichi Ubukata, Jae, Young K, Wonpil, Dowoon	No	—N/a	
2018	"Falling"	Day6	Unlock	Yes	Jae, Young K	Yes	Shinichi Ubukata, Jae, Young K, Wonpil, Dowoon	No	—N/a	
2018	"Say Hello"	Day6	Unlock	No	—N/a	Yes	220, Jae, Young K, Wonpil, Dowoon	No	—N/a	
2018	"Nobody Knows"	Day6	Unlock	Yes	Frants, Komura Tadashi, Young K, Wonpil	Yes	Frants, Young K, Wonpil	No	—N/a	
2018	"두통" (Headache)	Day6	Remember Us: Youth Part 2	No	—N/a	Yes	Hong Ji-sang, Jae, Young K, Wonpil	No	—N/a	
2018	"완전 멋지잖아" (So Cool)	Day6	Remember Us: Youth Part 2	No	—N/a	Yes	Hong Ji-sang, Jae, Young K, Wonpil	No	—N/a	
2018	"아픈길" (Hurt Road)	Day6	Remember Us: Youth Part 2	No	—N/a	Yes	Hong Ji-sang, Jae, Young K, Wonpil	No	—N/a	
2018	"행복했던 날들이었다" (Days Gone By)	Day6	Remember Us: Youth Part 2	No	—N/a	Yes	Hong Ji-sang, Jae, Young K, Wonpil	No	—N/a	
2018	"121U"	Day6	Remember Us: Youth Part 2	No	—N/a	Yes	Hong Ji-sang, Lee Woo-min, Jae, Young K, Wonpil	No	—N/a	
2019	"For Me"	Day6	The Book of Us: Gravity	No	—N/a	Yes	Hong Ji-sang, Jae, Young K, Wonpil	No	—N/a	
2019	"한 페이지가 될 수 있게" (Time of Our Life)	Day6	The Book of Us: Gravity	No	—N/a	Yes	Hong Ji-sang, Jae, Young K, Wonpil	No	—N/a	
2019	"포장" (Cover)	Day6	The Book of Us: Gravity	Yes	Young K	Yes	Kevin Cho, Lee Min-kyung, Young K, Wonpil	No	—N/a	
2019	"Best Part"	Day6	The Book of Us: Gravity	No	—N/a	Yes	Hong Ji-sang, Jae, Young K, Wonpil	No	—N/a	
2019	"How To Love"	Day6	The Book of Us: Gravity	No	—N/a	Yes	Hong Ji-sang, Jae, Young K, Wonpil	No	—N/a	
2019	"Gravitate"	Himself	Non-album singles	—N/a	—N/a	Yes	Cha Il-hun	—N/a	—N/a	Day6 World Tour Gravity in Seoul
2019	"나빠" (Not Fine)	Day6	The Book of Us: Entropy	No	—N/a	Yes	Hong Ji-sang, Jae, Young K, Wonpil	No	—N/a	
2019	"Deep In Love"	Day6	The Book of Us: Entropy	No	—N/a	Yes	Hong Ji-sang, Jae, Young K, Wonpil	No	—N/a	
2019	"Sweet Chaos"	Day6	The Book of Us: Entropy	No	—N/a	Yes	Hong Ji-sang, Jae, Young K, Wonpil	No	—N/a	
2019	"Finale"	Day6	The Best Day2	No	—N/a	Yes	Kevin Cho, Da-sol, Bae Jae-seok, Young K	No	—N/a	
2020	"Tick Tock"	Day6	The Book of Us: The Demon	No	—N/a	Yes	Hong Ji-sang, Jae, Young K, Wonpil	No	—N/a	
2020	"때려쳐" (Stop)	Day6	The Book of Us: The Demon	No	—N/a	Yes	Hong Ji-sang, Jae, Young K, Wonpil	No	—N/a	
2020	"Love Me or Leave Me"	Day6	The Book of Us: The Demon	No	—N/a	Yes	Hong Ji-sang, Jae, Young K, Wonpil	No	—N/a	
2020	"해와 달처럼" (Day and Night)	Day6	The Book of Us: The Demon	No	—N/a	Yes	Hong Ji-sang, Jae, Young K, Wonpil	No	—N/a	
2020	"1 To 10"	Day6	The Book of Us: The Demon	No	—N/a	Yes	Hong Ji-sang, Jae, Young K, Wonpil	No	—N/a	
2020	"Afraid"	Day6	The Book of Us: The Demon	Yes	Da-sol, Jae Dogi	Yes	Da-sol, Jae Dogi	No	—N/a	
2021	"구름 위에서" (Above The Clouds)	Day6	The Book of Us: Negentropy	Yes	Jae, Young K	Yes	Hong Ji-sang, Jae, Young K, Wonpil	Yes	Hong Ji-sang	
2021	"둘도 아닌 하나" (Only)	Day6	The Book of Us: Negentropy	No	—N/a	Yes	Hong Ji-sang, Jae, Young K, Wonpil	No	—N/a	
2024	"사랑하게 해주라" (Let Me Love You)	Day6	Fourever	No	—N/a	Yes	Hong Ji-sang, Wonpil	No	—N/a	
2024	"Happy"	Day6	Fourever	No	—N/a	Yes	Hong Ji-sang, Wonpil	No	—N/a	
2024	"그게 너의 사랑인지 몰랐어" (Didn't Know)	Day6	Fourever	Yes	Hong Ji-sang, Young K, Wonpil	Yes	Hong Ji-sang, Young K, Wonpil	No	—N/a	
2024	"Welcome to the Show"	Day6	Fourever	No	—N/a	Yes	Hong Ji-sang, Young K, Wonpil	No	—N/a	
2024	"널 제외한 나의 뇌" (Get the Hell Out"	Day6	Fourever	No	—N/a	Yes	Hong Ji-sang, Wonpil	No	—N/a	
2024	"The Power of Love"	Day6	Fourever	No	—N/a	Yes	Hong Ji-sang, Young K, Wonpil	No	—N/a	
2024	"나만 슬픈 엔딩" (Sad Ending)	Day6	Fourever	Yes	Hong Ji-sang, Young K, Wonpil	Yes	Hong Ji-sang, Wonpil	No	—N/a	
2024	"녹아내려요" (Melt Down)	Day6	Band Aid	No	—N/a	Yes	Young K, Wonpil, Hong Ji-sang	No	—N/a	
2024	"도와줘요 Rock&Roll" (Help Me Rock&Roll)	Day6	Band Aid	Yes	Hong Ji-sang, Wonpil	Yes	Hong Ji-sang, Wonpil	No	—N/a	
2024	"망겜" (Shxtty Game)	Day6	Band Aid	No	—N/a	Yes	Hong Ji-sang, Young K, Wonpil	No	—N/a	
2024	"I'm Fine"	Day6	Band Aid	Yes	Hong Ji-sang, Young K, Wonpil	Yes	Hong Ji-sang, Young K, Wonpil	No	—N/a	
2024	"괴물" (Monster)	Day6	Band Aid	No	—N/a	Yes	Hong Ji-sang, Young K, Wonpil, Dowoon	No	—N/a	
2024	"아직 거기 살아" (Still There)	Day6	Band Aid	No	—N/a	Yes	Hong Ji-sang, Young K, Wonpil	No	—N/a	
2024	"Counter"	Day6	Band Aid	No	—N/a	Yes	Hong Ji-sang, Young K, Wonpil	No	—N/a	
2024	"그녀가 웃었다" (She Smiled)	Day6	Band Aid	Yes	Hong Ji-sang, Wonpil	Yes	Hong Ji-sang, Young K, Wonpil	No	—N/a	
2024	"동화 속 아이처럼" (Covered in Love)	Himself	30	Yes	—N/a	Yes	Ming Ji-syeon	No	—N/a	
2024	"Check Pattern"	Himself	30	Yes	Lee Joo-hyoung, Jukjae	Yes	Lee Joo-hyoung, Jukjae	No	—N/a	
2024	"아무것도 안 하고 싶다" (I Don't Wanna Do Anything)	Himself	30	Yes	—N/a	Yes	Moof	No	—N/a	
2024	"어디에도 없는 널" (Nowhere You Are)	Himself	30	Yes	D'tour	Yes	Aaron Kim, Hahm, Bydor Archive, wez, Isaac Han	No	—N/a	
2024	"나무는 결국 겨울을 견뎌낼 거야" (As Always)	Himself	30	Yes	—N/a	Yes	Sim Hyun, Oh Ji-hyun	No	—N/a	
2024	"Wednesday Night"	Himself	30	Yes	D'tour	Yes	Aaron Kim, Isaac Han, D'tour	No	—N/a	
2024	"Easy"	Himself	30	Yes	—N/a	Yes	Sim Hyun	No	—N/a	
2024	"You Wake Me Up"	Himself	30	Yes	—N/a	Yes	Ming Ji-syeon	No	—N/a	
2024	"I Don't Wanna Lose"	Himself	30	Yes	Da-sol	Yes	Da-sol	No	—N/a	
2024	"Memories"	Himself	30	Yes	—N/a	Yes	Sim Hyun, Oh Ji-hyun	No	—N/a	
2025	"Maybe Tomorrow"	Day6	Non-album singles	No	—N/a	Yes	Young K, Wonpil, Hong Ji-sang	No	—N/a	
2025	"꿈의 버스" (Dream Bus)	Day6	The Decade	No	—N/a	Yes	Young K, Wonpil, Hong Ji-sang	No	—N/a	
2025	"Inside Out"	Day6	The Decade	No	—N/a	Yes	Young K, Wonpil, Hong Ji-sang	No	—N/a	
2025	"해야 뜨지 말아 줘" (Sun, Stay Asleep)	Day6	The Decade	No	—N/a	Yes	Young K, Wonpil, Hong Ji-sang	No	—N/a	
2025	"별들 앞에서" (Before the Stars)	Day6	The Decade	No	—N/a	Yes	Hong Ji-sang	No	—N/a	
2025	"Take All My Heart"	Day6	The Decade	No	—N/a	Yes	Young K, Wonpil, Hong Ji-sang	No	—N/a	
2025	"드디어 끝나갑니다" (So It's the End)	Day6	The Decade	No	—N/a	Yes	Young K, Wonpil, Hong Ji-sang	No	—N/a	
2025	"Lovin' the Christmas"	Day6	Non-album singles	No	—N/a	Yes	Young K, Wonpil, Hong Ji-sang	No	—N/a	

== Filmography ==
=== Radio shows ===
Year	Title	Role	Notes	Ref.
2022–2023	Station Z: Sungjin's D-Day	DJ	Every Wednesday (November 2, 2022 – June 28, 2023)	

== Concerts ==
- 30 (2024)
