= The Day (EP) =

EP by Day6
- Released: September 7, 2015
- Recorded: 2015
- Genres: K-pop; pop rock
- Length: 21:28
- Language: Korean
- Labels: JYP; KT
- Producer: J. Y. Park "The Asiansoul"

Day6 chronology
The Day (2015)	Daydream (2016)

Singles from The Day
- 1. "Congratulations" Released: September 7, 2015

The Day is the debut extended play (EP) by South Korean pop rock band Day6. It was released by JYP Entertainment on September 7, 2015. The EP features six original tracks.

It is the only album to feature member Junhyeok, who left the band on February 27, 2016.

== Track listing ==
No.	Title	Lyrics	Music	Arrangement	Length
1.	"Free하게" (Freely)	Naru; Day6	Naru; Day6	Naru	03:07
2.	"이상하게 계속 이래" (Out of My Mind)	Day6	Andrew Choi; 220; Day6	220	03:11
3.	"Congratulations"	Day6	Hong Ji-sang; Lee Woo-min; Day6	Hong Ji-sang; Lee Woo-min	03:49
4.	"버릇이 됐어" (Habits)	mr.cho; Day6	mr.cho; Park Gun-woo; Day6	mr.cho; Park Gun-woo; Day6	03:26
5.	"태양처럼" (Like That Sun)	Frants; Day6	Frants; Day6	Frants	03:38
6.	"Colors"	mr.cho; Day6	mr.cho; Jeon Jeong-hoon; Park Gun-woo; Day6	mr.cho; Jeon Jeong-hoon; Park Gun-woo; Day6	04:17
Total length:					21:28

== Charts ==
Chart (2016)	Peak position
South Korean Weekly Album Chart (Gaon)	6
South Korean Monthly Album Chart (Gaon)	12
US World Albums (Billboard)	2

== Sales ==
Region	Sales
South Korea (Gaon)	12,380

== Release history ==
Region	Date	Format	Label
South Korea	September 7, 2015	Digital download; CD	JYP; KT
Worldwide	September 7, 2015	Digital download	JYP
