= Young K =

South Korean singer (born 1993)

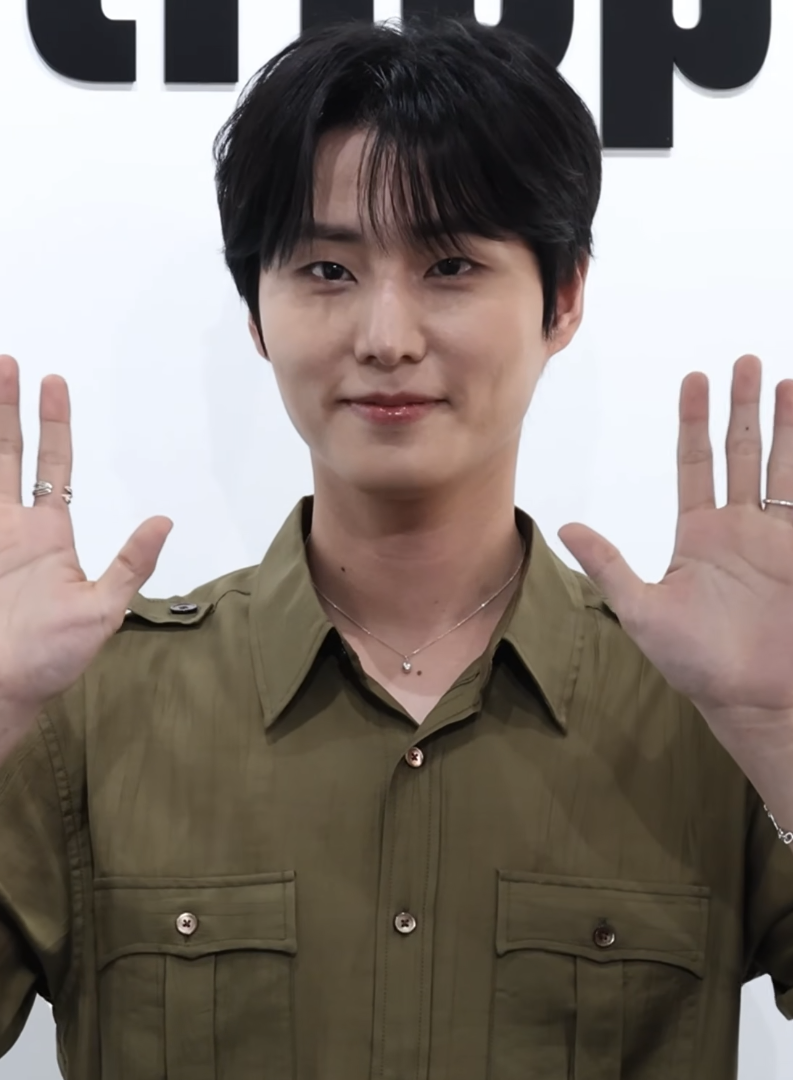
- Young K in June 2026
- Born: Kang Young-hyun; December 19, 1993 (age 32); Seoul, South Korea
- Other name: Brian Kang
- Education: Dongguk University
- Occupations: Musician; singer; songwriter; bassist; rapper; radio host
- Musical career
- Genre: Pop rock
- Instruments: Vocals; bass
- Years active: 2015–present
- Label: JYP
- Member of: Day6; JYP Nation

Korean name
- Hangul: 강영현
- Hanja: 姜永晛
- RR: Gang Yeonghyeon
- MR: Kang Yŏnghyŏn

Kang Young-hyun (Korean: 강영현; born December 19, 1993), known professionally as Young K (영케이), is a South Korean musician, singer, songwriter, and rapper. He is best known as the bassist and vocalist of South Korean pop rock band Day6.

== Early life ==
Kang Younghyun was born on December 19, 1993, in Seoul, South Korea as an only child. He was raised in Ilsan, South Korea and moved to Toronto, Canada. He attended St. Andrew’s Middle School, followed by York Mills Collegiate Institute. Since sixth grade, he has not lived with his parents. During this time, he went by his English name, Brian Kang. Kang moved to Korea in 2010 and became a trainee at JYP Entertainment (JYP). After he signed a contract with JYP, his father retired and moved to Toronto with his mother. On October 5, 2017, he received his bachelor's degree in Business Administration from Dongguk University while working on his band career. He graduated from university on August 23, 2018.

== Career ==
=== 2010–2015: Pre-debut ===
While attending middle and high school in Canada, Kang began his musical journey and career by forming two bands with his best friends Terry He and Don Lee. Their first band was called 3rd Degree. Their second band, Kiss Me Ever So Softly (KMESS), included two other close friends: Sean Yerzy and Sonny Tsai. The group posted several viral music videos and vlogs on He's YouTube channel and performed at various local competitions and shows (including several shows organized by A1 Radio, a subsidiary of Sing Tao News Corporation), which helped them garner a fanbase and attention from record labels and managers.

In the summer of 2010, after noticing Kang from his entry to JYP's Global Audition program and YouTube work, JYP Entertainment staff met with Kang and his bandmates in Toronto for an audition. Young K went on to appear in the fourth episode of WIN: Who is Next? as a part of JYP's rapping team with Got7's Mark Tuan and Jackson Wang against the combined rapping teams of Team A and Team B, where he became known for the verse, "YG, get an attitude!" He was also a part of JYP's vocalist team alongside his eventual Day6 bandmates Junhyeok, Jae, Sungjin and Wonpil.

In 2014, Kang was selected as a member of five-member rock band 5Live under JYP, but their debut was cancelled. The band was reformed as Day6 after the addition of drummer Dowoon in 2015. Kang was also originally selected as a member of the group Got7, but was ultimately cut from the lineup.

=== 2015–present: DAY6, Solo activities, Even of Day (EoD) and solo debut ===
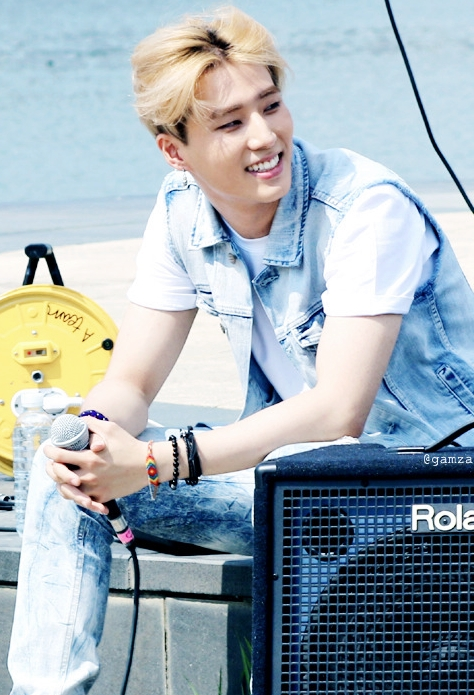
Young K performing in 2015

On September 7, 2015, Young K made his debut as a member of Day6 and released their debut EP, The Day, with the lead single "Congratulations".

Young K has been credited with much of the songwriting in Day6's discography.

In September 2015, Young K was featured in fellow JYP artist, the solo artist Baek A-yeon song titled "Shouldn't Have" where he did and wrote the rap part. The song went on to become a sleeper hit, reaching number one on several Korean music real-time charts a month after its release among fierce competition. He was also featured in a song of Korean indie musicians Park Sae-byul & Like Likes, in the song titled "Sky High": Kang did the rap part. He has also been featured as rapper in JYP label mate Park Ji-min's single "Young해".

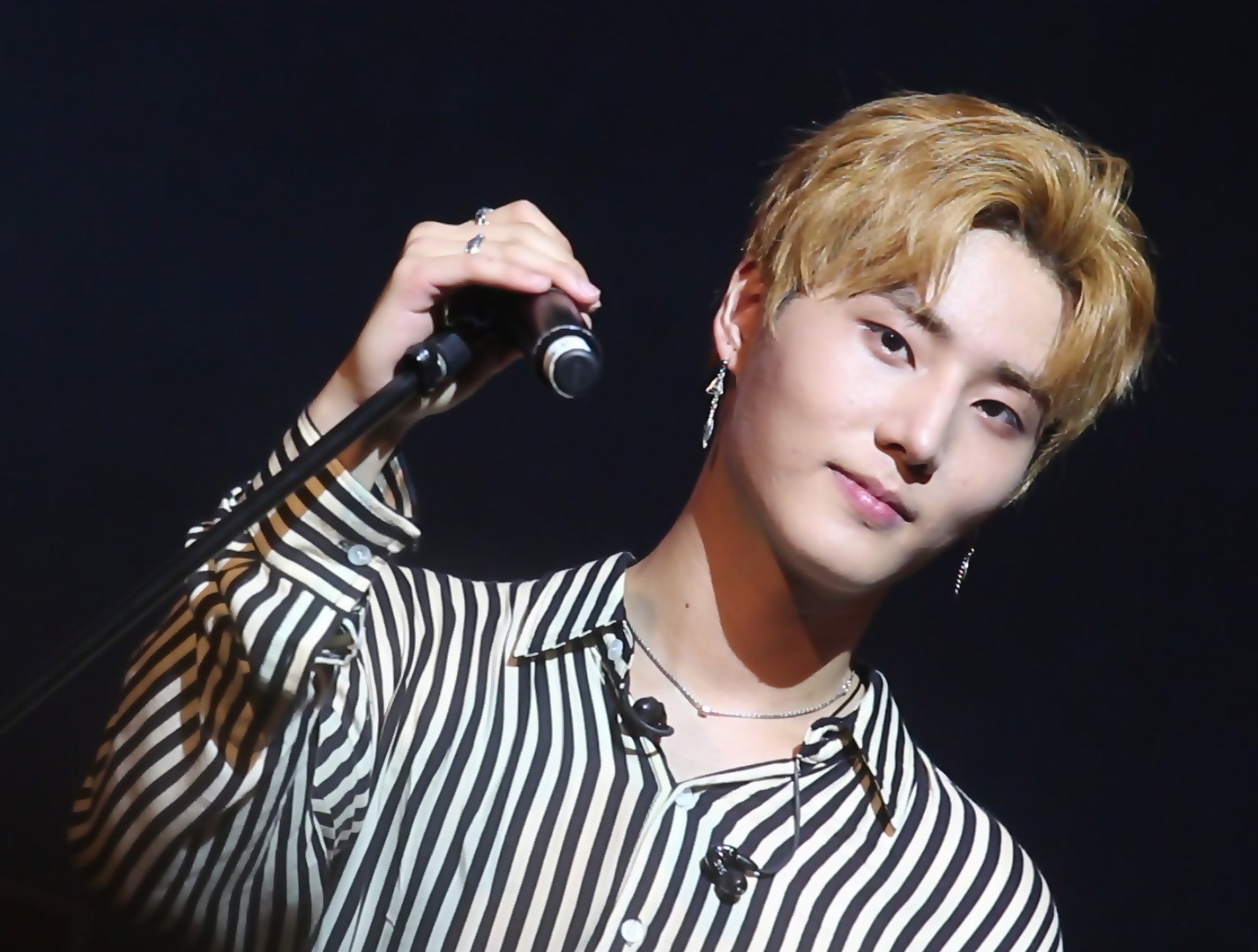
Young K performing in 2017

On March 14, 2018, he made his debut as a member of Day6 in Japan with first Japanese single "If (Mata Aetara)". The single also serves as theme song for the Japanese drama Repeat.

In 2019, he composed and contributed lyrics to a track for the solo debut of B.A.P's Youngjae entitled "Hope".

Together with Got7's Youngjae he became the new DJ of MBC Radio Idol Radio starting from May 18, 2020. The first season of the show ended on September 25.

On August 31, 2020, Young K, Dowoon and Wonpil debuted as Even of Day, a sub-unit of Day6 and released their debut EP The Book of Us: Gluon, with the lead single "Where the Sea Sleeps".

On September 19, 2020, Young K collaborated with American pop duo X Lovers with a remix version of "Love".

On October 16 and 23, 2020, Young K and Wonpil made a surprise appearance as a cameo in the web drama Let Me Off the Earth.

On November 23, 2020, Kang became the new DJ for KBS CoolFM's Kiss The Radio, in which he was invited to reprise the role after his military discharge in April 2023. He eventually reprised the DJ role for Kiss The Radio on June 19, 2023.

On January 14, 2021, Kang featured as rapper in Thai singer Apiwat Ueathavornsuk (Stamp)'s single "Sugar High".

On May 28, 2021, Kang featured in Ben&Ben remake song "Leaves" and this also comes as Kang's first collaboration with a Filipino act.

On September 6, 2021, Kang made his solo debut with the extended play Eternal, which consists of seven songs including the title track "Guard You", "Come as you are(그대로 와 줘요)" and "Microphone".

On June 23, 2023, Kang released the single "Better Day", in which he wrote the lyrics. The song is the winning song of the music contest Songs That Care hosted by JYP Entertainment. Kang also performed the song live at 2023 JYP EDM Day - the video is published by JYP Entertainment on YouTube.

On August 25, 2023, Kang released the single "Let it be Summer", which would be featured in his upcoming first studio album Letters with Notes. The album was released on September 4, together with its title track "Nothing But".

On December 23, 2023, Young K won the Radio DJ of the Year award at the 2023 KBS Entertainment Awards for hosting the radio show Kiss The Radio.

On January 2, 2024, Young K won the Ballad Award under the Genre-based awards at the 33rd Seoul Music Awards held at Bangkok, Thailand. Notably, he was ranked first among the award nominees with a total mobile vote of 52.78%. He also performed the songs "Nothing But (이것밖에는 없다)" and "Time of Our Life (한 페이지가 될 수 있게)" live at the award ceremony.

On April 10, 2024, Young K was awarded the "Best Rock Ballad Award" at Asia Star Entertainer Awards 2024 held at the K Arena in Yokohama, Japan.

== Personal life ==
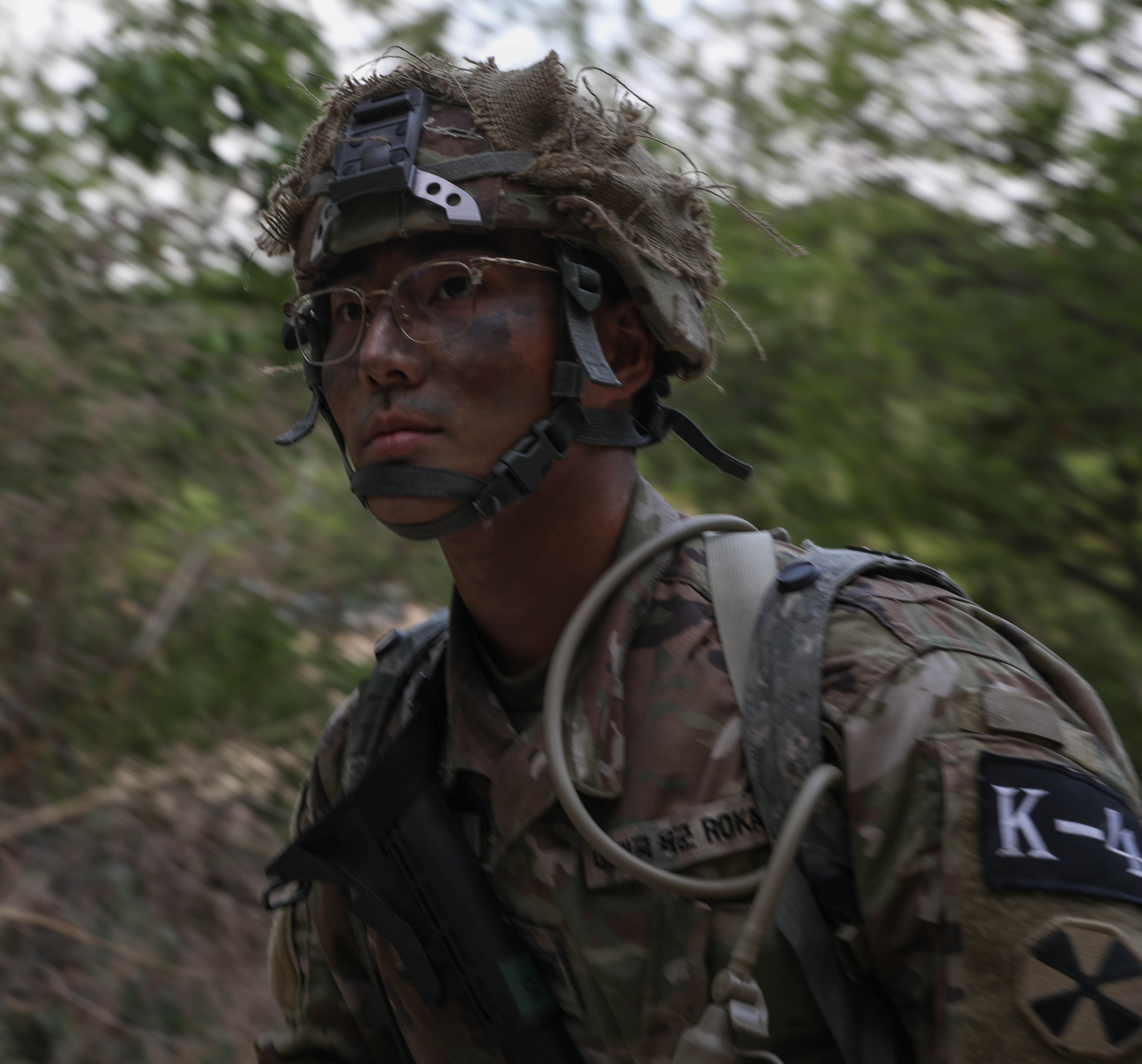
Young K on May 8, 2022 during the land navigation course of the Best Warrior competition at Camp Casey in South Korea

On August 16, 2021, Young K announced that he will enlist as part of his mandatory military service on October 12, 2021, where he will be serving in KATUSA. During his military service, Young K won the "2022 Eighth Army Best Warrior Competition" in KATUSA category, held from May 8 to May 13, 2022. He also appeared in the eighth episode of tvN variety program, The Backpacker Chef, which aired on July 14, 2022. He was awarded the Army Commendation Medal along with additional gifts from local military support groups and many other rewards. On November 20, the Eighth Army (United States) released the current situation of Young K, who had just been promoted to Sgt (U.S. Army Sergeant, a rank equivalent to Sergeant in the Republic of Korea Army), through its official SNS, an official on November 20. He was discharged on April 11, 2023.

== Discography ==
=== Studio albums ===
List of studio albums, with selected chart positions and sales
Title	Details	Peak chart positions	Sales
Title	Details	KOR	Sales
Letters with Notes	Released: September 4, 2023; Label: JYP Entertainment; Formats: CD, digital download, streaming	5	KOR: 55,189
Youngest	Released: July 27, 2026; Label: JYP Entertainment; Formats: CD, digital download, streaming	2	KOR: 181,450

=== Extended plays ===
List of extended plays, with selected chart positions and sales
Title	Details	Peak chart positions	Sales
Title	Details	KOR	Sales
Eternal	Released: September 6, 2021; Label: JYP Entertainment; Formats: CD, digital download, streaming	8	KOR: 59,261

=== Singles ===
==== As lead artist ====
List of lead singles, showing year released, selected chart positions, and name of the album
Title	Year	Peak chart positions		Album
Title	Year	KOR	KOR DL	Album
"Guard You" (끝까지 안아 줄게)	2021	—	29	Eternal
"Come as You Are" (그대로 와 줘요)	2021	—	84	Eternal
"Better Day"	2023	—	—	Non-album single
"Let It Be Summer"	2023	—	74	Letters with Notes
"Nothing But" (이것밖에는 없다)	2023	—	31	Letters with Notes
"Shut the Door"	2026	61	—	Youngest
"—" denotes that the song did not chart in the region.

==== As featured artist ====
List of featured singles, showing year released, selected chart positions, sales, and name of the album
Title	Year	Peak chart positions	Sales (DL)	Album
Title	Year	KOR	Sales (DL)	Album
"Shouldn't Have" (이럴거면 그러지말지) (Baek A-yeon featuring Young K)	2015	1	KOR: 2,500,000+	Non-album singles
"Sky High" (Park Sae-byul & Like, Likes featuring Young K)	2015	—	—N/a	Non-album singles
"20" (Young해) (Park Ji-min featuring Young K)	2016	157	KOR: 13,829	19 to 20
"Love" (X Lovers featuring Young K)	2020	—	—N/a	Non-album singles
"Sugar High" (ใจอ้วน) (STAMP featuring Young K)	2021	—	—N/a	Non-album singles
"What a Wonderful Word" (Park Monn-chi featuring Young K)	2021	—	—N/a	Non-album singles
"Leaves" (Ben&Ben featuring Young K)	2021	—	—N/a	Non-album singles
"Maybe Next Time" (Jamie Miller featuring Young K)	2023	—	—N/a	Non-album singles
"Slow" (Big Ocean featuring Young K)	2024	—	—N/a	Non-album singles
"It Just Happened" (Cheeze featuring Young K)	2025	—	—N/a	Non-album singles
"—" denotes that the song did not chart in the region.

=== Promotional singles ===
List of promotional singles, showing year released, selected chart positions, and name of the album
Title	Year	Peak chart positions	Album
Title	Year	KOR DL	Album
"Am I in Love?" (아마도 사랑인가 봐)	2023	114	Move Up K-Billboard Pt.2
"7-Eleven with You" (Note: Promotional release for 7-Eleven)	2023	—	Non-album single
"—" denotes that the song did not chart in the region.

=== Soundtrack appearances ===
List of soundtrack appearances, showing year released, selected chart positions, and name of the album
Title	Year	Peak chart positions	Album
Title	Year	KOR DL	Album
"Insomnia" (불면증)	2020	—	Let Me Off the Earth OST
"Insomnia" (Future Bass Remix)	2020	—	Let Me Off the Earth OST
"With You" (웹툰)	2023	170	No Office Romance! OST
"Butterfly" (나비)	2023	91	Castaway Diva OST
"Love Will Find A Way" (나무가 될게)	2025	—	Good Boy OST
"Season of Us" (다시 돌아온 계절)	2026	—	My Royal Nemesis OST
"—" denotes that the song did not chart in the region.

=== Other charted songs ===
List of other charted songs, showing year released, selected chart positions, and name of the album
Title	Year	Peak chart positions		Album
Title	Year	KOR	KOR DL	Album
"Best Song" (베스트 송)	2021	—	95	Eternal
"Not Gonna Love" (사랑은 얼어 죽을)	2021	—	110	Eternal
"Microphone"	2021	—	94	Eternal
"Want to Love You"	2021	—	113	Eternal
"Goodnight, Dear" (잘 자라 내 사람아)	2021	—	111	Eternal
"Waited" (오늘만을 너만을 이날을)	2023	—	62	Letters with Notes
"Dreamer" (꿈꾼)	2023	—	69	Letters with Notes
"Bungee Jumping"	2023	—	72	Letters with Notes
"Natural"	2023	—	67	Letters with Notes
"Strange"	2023	—	76	Letters with Notes
"Soul"	2023	—	75	Letters with Notes
"Playground"	2023	—	78	Letters with Notes
"Babo"	2023	—	79	Letters with Notes
"What Is..."	2023	—	68	Letters with Notes
"Marionette"	2026	180	—	Youngest
"F World"	2026	150	—	Youngest
"Hey Honey"	2026	183	—	Youngest
"Anthem" (응원가)	2026	171	—	Youngest
"—" denotes releases that did not chart.

=== Songwriting credits ===
The lists of songwriting credits below is the lists that Young K was credited for other artists, besides Day6 and his solo.

All song credits are adapted from the Korea Music Copyright Association's database unless otherwise stated.

Lists of songwriting credits for other artists
Year	Song title	Artist	Album title	Lyrics		Composing		Ref.
Year	Song title	Artist	Album title	Credited	With	Credited	With	Ref.
Before debut
2015	"Shouldn't Have" (이럴거면 그러지말지)	Baek A-yeon feat. Young K	Non-album single	Yes	Shim Eun-ji, Baek A-yeon	No		
After debut
2016	"Stuck On You" (빠져가지고)	Up10tion	Burst	Yes	Wonpil, Sungjin (Day6), Daniel Kim	Yes	Wonpil, Sungjin (Day6), Daniel Kim	
2016	"Young해"	Jamie feat. Young K	19 to 20	Yes		No		
2016	"Answer"	Jamie	19 to 20	Yes	Nathan	No		
2016	"Beggin On My Knees"	Got7	Flight Log: Departure	Yes		No		
2017	"In Your Eyes"	Crude Play	The Liar and His Lover OST	Yes	Frants	No		
2018	"Sleep Mode"	Nakjoon	Still...	Yes		No		
2019	"Hope"	Young-jae	Fancy	Yes	Isaac Han	Yes		
2019	"Love Me Tonight"	휴이 (ḦU)	RE:verse	No		Yes		
2019	"I Want You More" (원해)	휴이 (ḦU)	RE:verse	No		Yes		
2020	"Don't Know"	Jeong Se-woon	24 Part.1	Yes	Jeong Se-woon	No		
2020	"Trouble with You"	Eric Nam	The Other Side	Yes	Eric Nam	No		
2020	"Paradise"	Eric Nam	The Other Side	Yes	Eric Nam	No		
2020	"How You Been"	Eric Nam	The Other Side	Yes	Eric Nam	No		
2020	"Love Die Young (Korean Ver.)"	Eric Nam	The Other Side	Yes		No		
2021	"Sugar High" (Thai: ใจอ้วน)	STAMP feat. Young K	Non-album single	Yes	STAMP	No		
2021	"Late Night Movie" (심야영화)	Ha Hyun-sang	Non-album single	Yes	Ha Hyun-sang	No		
2021	"What a Wonderful Word"	Park Moon-chi, Young K	What a Wonderful Word	Yes	Park Moon-chi, DVWN	Yes	Park Moon-chi, DVWN	
2021	"Diving to the top" (낙하산은 펴지 않을게요)	The Wild Idol	—N/a	Yes	Wonpil, Shim Eun-ji	No		
2022	"Voiceless" (안녕, 잘 가)	Wonpil	Pilmography	Yes	Wonpil	No		
2022	"Sincerity" (지우게)	Wonpil	Pilmography	Yes	Wonpil	No		
2022	"Stranded" (외딴섬의 외톨이)	Wonpil	Pilmography	Yes	Wonpil	No		
2022	"Unpainted Canvas" (그리다 보면)	Wonpil	Pilmography	Yes	Wonpil	No		
2022	"Rose Blossom" (건물 사이에 피어난 장미)	H1-Key	Rose Blossom	Yes		No		
2023	"Good Enough"	Xdinary Heroes	Deadlock	Yes	Gunil	No		
2023	"Puzzlin'"	Riina (H1-Key), Miru Shiroma, Suyun (Rocket Punch), Soojin (Weeekly), Wooyeon (Woo!ah!), Jiwon (Cherry Bullet), Kei	Queendom Puzzle Semi Final	Yes		Yes	GARDEN, HotSauce	
2023	"Lemon Black Tea"	Jo Yu-ri	Love All	Yes		No		
2023	"Seoul (Such a Beautiful City)"	H1-Key	Seoul Dreaming	Yes		No		
2024	"Run for Roses"	Nmixx	Fe3O4: Break	Yes	Lee Seu-ran, Frankie Day (The Hub)	No		
2024	"Wheee" (휘이)	Whee In	Non-album single	Yes		Yes	Nah Sang-hyun	
2024	"Deeper" (기뻐)	H1-Key	Non-album single	Yes	Hong Ji-sang	No		
2024	"Hello"	Zerobaseone	You Had Me at Hello	Yes	Bang Hye-hyun	No		
2024	"Fire!"	Lee Na-yeong, Lee Soo-young, Yang Ie-rae, Jung Yu-ri, Khan Amina	<Girls on Fire> Episode.3	Yes		Yes	paulkyte	
2024	"Falling"	Woodz feat. Young K	Non-album single	Yes	Woodz	Yes	Woodz, Nathan, Hoho	
2024	"Longing For The One I Lost" (이미 지나간 너에게 하는 말)	HYNN	Unspoken Goodbye	Yes		No		
2025	"Warriors"	KickFlip	Flip It, Kick It!	Yes		No		
2025	"Hee World"	Seo Hee	Undercover TOP 5	Yes	Klozer, Seo Hee	Yes	Jung Yeong-a, Klozer	
2025	"Even if I'm dying (feat. Young K)"	paulkyte	Full Price Phobia	Yes	paulkyte, Grace Shin	No		

== Filmography ==
=== Television series ===
Year	Title	Role	Notes	Ref.
2011	Dream High	Jason backup dancer	Extra, episode 3	
2012	Dream High 2	I:dn backup dancer	Extra, episode 1	

=== Web series ===
Year	Title	Role	Notes	Ref.
2016	Touching You	Customer	Cameo (episode 11)	
2020	Let Me Off the Earth	Intern teacher	Cameo (episode 6–7) with Wonpil	

=== Television shows ===
Year	Title	Role	Notes	Ref.
2019	King of Mask Singer	Contestant	as "Narwhal"	
2022	The Backpacker Chef	Special appearance	Episode 8 (while serving in the military)	
2023	Super Karaoke Survival: VS	Producer	with Kim Min-seok	
2023	Hangout with Yoo	Main vocal of One Top	Episode 207–211	
2024	Girls on Fire	Judge / Producer		

=== Web shows ===
Year	Title	Role	Notes	Ref.
2024	K Survival Story (K생존기)	Host		

=== Radio shows ===
Year	Title	Role	Notes	Ref.
2020	Idol Radio	DJ	with Got7's Youngjae from May 18 – September 25	
2020–2021 2023–2024	Kiss the Radio	DJ	From November 23, 2020 – October 10, 2021; June 19, 2023 – June 30, 2024.	

=== Hosting ===
Year	Title	Notes	Ref.
2025	SBS Gayo Daejeon	with An Yu-jin and Jaemin	
