= List of After School Club episodes =

After School Club is a South Korean variety show, internet based live music request television talk show hosted by K-pop idols Allen and Taeyoung (Cravity) and Aaron Kwak.

== Episodes ==
=== 2013 ===
List of Episodes (2013)

| Episode | Air Date | MC | Guest |
|---|---|---|---|
| 1 (Note: The First Episode of ASC.) (Note: Dongjun and Hyungsik weren't able to attend.) | April 17, 2013 | Eric Nam and Hanbyul (LEDApple) | ZE:A FIVE |
| 2 | April 24, 2013 | Eric Nam and Hanbyul (LEDApple) | Heo Young-saeng (SS501) and M.I.B |
| 3 | May 1, 2013 | Eric Nam and Hanbyul (LEDApple) | uBEAT |
| 4 | May 8, 2013 | Eric Nam and Hanbyul (LEDApple) | C-Clown |
| 5 | May 15, 2013 | Eric Nam and Hanbyul (LEDApple) | 9MUSES |
| 6 | May 22, 2013 | Eric Nam and Hanbyul (LEDApple) | Secret |
| 7 | May 29, 2013 | Eric Nam and Hanbyul (LEDApple) | MFBTY |
| 8 (Note: Eric Nam was not able to attend.) | June 5, 2013 | Hanbyul and Tia (ChoColat) | VIXX |
| 9 (Note: First guest to trend worldwide on Twitter.) | June 12, 2013 | Eric Nam and Hanbyul | EXO |
| 10 | June 19, 2013 | Eric Nam and Hanbyul | MBLAQ |
| 11 (Note: Woori was not able to attend.) | June 26, 2013 | Eric Nam and Hanbyul | Rainbow |
| 12 (Note: Hanbyul's birthday episode.) | July 3, 2013 | Eric Nam and Hanbyul | LC9 |
| 13 | July 10, 2013 | Eric Nam and Hanbyul | 100% |
| Special (Note: Special episode.) | July 12, 2013 | Eric Nam and Hanbyul | ZE:A |
| 14 | July 17, 2013 | Eric Nam and Hanbyul | Girl's Day |
| 15 | July 24, 2013 | Eric Nam and Hanbyul | Lee Seung-chul |
| 16 (Note: Summer Special) | July 31, 2013 | Eric Nam and Hanbyul | None |
| 17 (Note: Yunyoung was not able to attend.) | August 7, 2013 | Eric Nam and Hanbyul | A-JAX |
| 18 | August 14, 2013 | Eric Nam and Hanbyul | B.A.P |
| 19 | August 21, 2013 | Eric Nam and Hanbyul | Lee Jung-hyun |
| 20 | August 28, 2013 | Eric Nam and Hanbyul | MYNAME |
| 21 | September 4, 2013 | Eric Nam and Hanbyul | NU'EST |
| 22 | September 11, 2013 | Eric Nam and Hanbyul | History |
| 23 (Note: Chuseok special.) | September 18, 2013 | Eric Nam, Hanbyul and Tia | BtoB |
| 24 | September 25, 2013 | Eric Nam and Hanbyul | BTS |
| 25 | October 2, 2013 | Eric Nam and Hanbyul | TASTY |
| 26 | October 9, 2013 | Eric Nam and Hanbyul | Block B |
| 27 | October 16, 2013 | Eric Nam and Hanbyul | BIGSTAR |
| 28 | October 23, 2013 | Eric Nam and Hanbyul | Taecyeon (2PM) |
| 29 (Note: Minho was not able to attend.) | October 30, 2013 | Eric Nam and Hanbyul | SHINee |
| 30 | November 6, 2013 | Eric Nam and Hanbyul | Boyfriend |
| 31 (Note: Eric Nam's Birthday episode.) | November 13, 2013 | Eric Nam and Hanbyul | U-KISS |
| 32 (Note: Min served as a special MC.) | November 20, 2013 | Hanbyul and Rome (C-Clown) | miss A |
| 33 | November 27, 2013 | Eric Nam and Hanbyul | F.T. Island |
| 34 | December 4, 2013 | Eric Nam and Hanbyul | Topp Dogg |
| 35 | December 11, 2013 | Eric Nam and Hanbyul | VIXX |
| 36 | December 18, 2013 | Eric Nam and Hanbyul | The Boss |
| 37 (Note: Christmas Special.) (Note: Year-end special.) (Note: Hanbyul wasn't able to attend.) | December 25, 2013 | Eric Nam | None |

=== 2014 ===
List of Episodes (2014)

| Episode | Air Date | MC | Guest |
|---|---|---|---|
| 38 (Note: New Year's special.) | January 1, 2014 | Eric Nam | M.Pire |
| 39 (Note: Jang Han-byul officially announced his departure from the show.) | January 8, 2014 | Eric Nam and Hanbyul | AOA |
| 40 | January 15, 2014 | Eric Nam and Min (miss A) | Ailee |
| 41 (Note: The episode trended #1 worldwide on Twitter during airing.) | January 22, 2014 | Eric Nam and Min (miss A) | Got7 |
| 42 (Note: Lunar New Year special.) | January 29, 2014 | Eric Nam and Min (miss A) | B1A4 |
| 43 (Note: First episode of Kevin as a regular host.) | February 5, 2014 | Eric Nam and Kevin (U-KISS) | Royal Pirates |
| 44 (Note: Kevin was not able to attend.) | February 12, 2014 | Eric Nam and Moon (Royal Pirates) | Rainbow Blaxx |
| 45 | February 19, 2014 | Eric Nam and Sam (LUNAFLY) | B.A.P |
| 46 (Note: It was announced that the airing times will be different. The show is now aired Tuesdays at 1pm, and the after show is aired on Wednesdays at 5pm.) | February 26, 2014 | Eric Nam and Kevin | BTS |
| 47 | March 4, 2014 | Eric Nam and Kevin | BtoB |
| 48 (Note: After Show episode.) (Note: First After Show episode.) | March 5, 2014 | Eric Nam and Kevin | Moon (Royal Pirates) |
| 49 | March 11, 2014 | Eric Nam and Kevin | Ladies' Code |
| 50 | March 12, 2014 | Eric Nam and Kevin | Royal Pirates (Soo Yoon, James) |
| 51 | March 18, 2014 | Eric Nam and Kevin | ToHeart |
| 52 | March 19, 2014 | Eric Nam and Kevin | Ashley (Ladies' Code) |
| 53 | March 24, 2014 | Eric Nam and Kevin | SPEED |
| 54 | March 26, 2014 | Eric Nam and Kevin | Ashley (Ladies' Code) |
| 55 (Note: G.O and Lee Joon were not able to attend.) | April 1, 2014 | Eric Nam and Kevin | MBLAQ |
| 56 | April 2, 2014 | Eric Nam and Kevin | BTS (RM, Jimin) |
| 57 | April 8, 2014 | Eric Nam and Kevin | Apink |
| 58 | April 9, 2014 | Eric Nam | Got7 (Mark, Jackson) |
| 59 | April 15, 2014 | Eric Nam and Min (miss A) | Boys Republic |
| 60 (Note: After School Club's Anniversary special.) | April 16, 2014 | Eric Nam and Kevin | None |
| 61 (Note: Sewol Ferry Tribute Special (Pre-recorded).) | April 29, 2014 | Eric Nam and Kevin | None |
| 62 | April 30, 2014 | Eric Nam and Kevin | None |
| 63 | May 6, 2014 | Eric Nam and Kevin | RM (BTS) |
| 64 | May 7, 2014 | Eric Nam and Kevin | RM (BTS) |
| 65 (Note: KEric's & Friends Special.) | May 13, 2014 | Eric Nam and Kevin | Brad (Busker Busker), Amber (f(x)), Peniel (BtoB) |
| 66 | May 14, 2014 | Kevin | Eli (U-KISS), Peniel (BtoB) |
| 67 | May 20, 2014 | Eric Nam and NS Yoon-G | 15& |
| 68 | May 21, 2014 | Eric Nam | BTS (Jimin, Jungkook, RM) |
| 69 | May 27, 2014 | Eric Nam and Kevin | Junggigo, Soyou (SISTAR), Mad Clown |
| 70p | May 28, 2014 | Eric Nam | BTS (Jimin, Jungkook, RM) |
| 71 (Note: Woohyun was not able to attend.) | June 3, 2014 | Eric Nam and Kevin | INFINITE |
| 72 | June 4, 2014 | Eric Nam | Brad (Busker Busker) and Peniel (BtoB) |
| 73 (Note: Kevin appeared as a guest and a MC.) | June 10, 2014 | Eric Nam and Kevin | U-KISS |
| 74 | June 11, 2014 | Eric Nam and Kevin | Brad (Busker Busker) and Peniel (BtoB) |
| 75 | June 17, 2014 | Eric Nam and Kevin | N-Sonic |
| 76 | June 18, 2014 | Eric Nam and Kevin | 15& |
| 77 | June 24, 2014 | Eric Nam and Kevin | Got7 |
| 78 | June 25, 2014 | Eric Nam and Kevin | 15& |
| 79 | July 1, 2014 | Eric Nam and Kevin | K.Will |
| 80 | July 2, 2014 | Eric Nam | Got7 (Mark, Jackson) |
| 81 | July 8, 2014 | Eric Nam and Sanchez (Phantom) | Boyfriend |
| 82 | July 9, 2014 | Eric Nam | Sanchez (Phantom), Royal Pirates (Moon, Soo Yoon) |
| 83 | July 15, 2014 | Eric Nam and Sanchez (Phantom) | 100% |
| 84 | July 16, 2014 | Eric Nam | Got7 (Mark, Jackson) |
| 85 (Note: Sojin wasn't able to attend.) | July 22, 2014 | Eric Nam | Girl's Day |
| 86 | July 23, 2014 | Eric Nam | BtoB (Eunkwang, Hyunsik, Peniel) |
| 87 (Note: First episode of Jimin as a regular After Show host.) | July 29, 2014 | Eric Nam and Jimin (15&) | C-Clown |
| 88 | July 30, 2014 | Eric Nam | Sanchez (Phantom), San E |
| 89 | August 5, 2014 | Eric Nam and Jimin | Sistar |
| 90 | August 6, 2014 | Eric Nam | Peniel (BtoB), NS Yoon-G |
| 91 | August 12, 2014 | Eric Nam | 15&, Brad (Busker Busker), Peniel (BtoB) |
| 92 | August 13, 2014 | Eric Nam | 15&, Brad (Busker Busker), Peniel (BtoB) |
| 93 | August 19, 2014 | Eric Nam and Jimin | Homme |
| 94 | August 20, 2014 | Eric Nam and Jimin | C-Clown (Rome, Kangjun) |
| 95 | August 26, 2014 | Eric Nam and Jimin | BTS |
| 96 | August 27, 2014 | Eric Nam and Jimin | C-Clown (Rome, Kangjun) |
| 97 | September 2, 2014 | Eric Nam and Kevin | Taemin (SHINee) |
| 98 | September 3, 2014 | Eric Nam and Kevin | NU'EST (Aron, Minhyun, Ren) |
| 99 | September 9, 2014 | Eric Nam, Kevin, and Jimin | Royal Pirates |
| 100 (Note: 100th episode special.) | September 10, 2014 | Eric Nam | NU'EST (Aron, Minhyun, Ren) |
| 101 | September 16, 2014 | Eric Nam and Kevin | Teen Top |
| 102 | September 17, 2014 | Eric Nam and Kevin | Jessi (Lucky J) |
| 103 | September 23, 2014 | Eric Nam and Jimin | 2PM (Nichkhun, Wooyoung, Chansung) |
| 104 | September 24, 2014 | Eric Nam and Jimin | HIGH4 |
| 105 | September 30, 2014 | Eric Nam and Brad (Busker Busker) | Ailee |
| 106 | October 1, 2014 | Eric Nam, Kevin, and Brad (Busker Busker) | James (Royal Pirates) |
| 107 | October 7, 2014 | Eric Nam and Kevin | JJCC |
| 108 | October 8, 2014 | Eric Nam and Kevin | Jessi (Lucky J) |
| 109 | October 14, 2014 | Eric Nam and Jimin | BTOB |
| 110 | October 15, 2014 | Eric Nam and Jimin | JJCC (Eddy, Prince Mak) |
| 111 (Note: Ken wasn't able to attend.) | October 21, 2014 | Eric Nam and Kevin | VIXX |
| 112 (Note: Hash Tag for the fan special.) | October 22, 2014 | Eric Nam, Kevin, and Jimin | Alex (HIGH4) |
| 113 | October 28, 2014 | Eric Nam and Kevin | Red Velvet |
| 114 | October 29, 2014 | Eric Nam, Kevin, and Jimin | Nakjoon |
| 115 (Note: Battle of the Rookies special) | November 4, 2014 | Eric Nam and Kevin | BESTie, B.I.G |
| 116 | November 5, 2014 | Eric Nam, Kevin, and Jimin | Bipa (Lip Service) |
| 117 | November 11, 2014 | Eric Nam and Kevin | Madtown |
| 118 | November 12, 2014 | Eric Nam, Kevin, and Jimin | Moon (Royal Pirates) |
| 119 | November 18, 2014 | Eric Nam and Jimin | Laboum |
| 120 | November 19, 2014 | Eric Nam, Kevin, and Jimin | Aron (NU'EST) |
| 121 (Note: Kevin's birthday episode) | November 25, 2014 | Eric Nam and Kevin | Nicole Jung |
| 122 | November 26, 2014 | Kevin and Jimin | Got7 |
| 123 | December 2, 2014 | Eric Nam and Jimin | HALO |
| 124 | December 3, 2014 | Eric Nam and Jimin | Madtown (Moos, Daewon) |
| 125 (Note: Mina wasn't able to attend.) | December 9, 2014 | Eric Nam and Jimin | AOA |
| 126 | December 10, 2014 | Eric Nam and Brad (Busker Busker) | JJCC (Eddy, Prince Mak) |
| 127 | December 16, 2014 | Eric Nam | Apink |
| 128 | December 17, 2014 | Eric Nam and Brad (Busker Busker) | Peniel (BtoB), James (Royal Pirates) |
| 129 | December 23, 2014 | Eric Nam and Jimin | MFBTY |
| 130 | December 24, 2014 | Eric Nam, Kevin, and Jimin | Moon (Royal Pirates) |
| 131 | December 30, 2014 | Eric Nam and Jimin | JJCC (Eddy, Prince Mak), Bipa (Lip Service), Benji (B.I.G) and Alex (HIGH4) |
| 132 (Note: ASC Awards (Pre-recorded).) | December 31, 2014 | Eric Nam and Jimin | None |

=== 2015 ===
List of Episodes (2015)

| Episode | Air Date | MC | Guest |
|---|---|---|---|
| 133 | January 6, 2015 | Eric Nam and Kevin | Hello Venus |
| 134 | January 7, 2015 | Eric Nam, Kevin and Jimin | Eat Your Kimchi |
| 135 | January 13, 2015 | Eric Nam and Kevin | Boyfriend |
| 136 | January 14, 2015 | Eric Nam and Jimin | Benji (B.I.G) |
| 137 | January 20, 2015 | Benji (B.I.G) and NS Yoon-G | Noel |
| 138 | January 21, 2015 | Eric Nam and Kevin | Jimin (15&), and Benji (B.I.G) |
| 139 | January 27, 2015 | Eric Nam and Kevin | U-KISS |
| 140 | January 28, 2015 | Eric Nam and Jimin | Brad (Busker Busker), James (Royal Pirates) |
| 141 | February 2, 2015 | Eric Nam and Kevin | 9MUSES |
| 142 | February 3, 2015 | Eric Nam and Jimin | Jessi (Lucky J) |
| 143 | February 10, 2015 | Eric Nam and Kevin | Infinite H |
| 144 | February 11, 2015 | Eric Nam and Jimin | Got7 (Mark, Jackson) |
| 145 | February 17, 2015 | Eric Nam and Kevin | Amber (f(x)) |
| 146 | February 18, 2015 | Eric Nam and Jimin | Yerin (15&), Bambam (Got7) |
| 147 | February 24, 2015 | Kevin and Benji (B.I.G) | 4Minute |
| 148 (Note: Last After Show episode.) | February 25, 2015 | Kevin and Benji (B.I.G) | None |
| 149 (Note: The show is now aired without the After Show part) | March 3, 2015 | Eric Nam and Kevin | MYNAME |
| 150 (Note: Jimin becomes an ASC official MC.) | March 10, 2015 | Kevin and Jimin | Eric Nam |
| 151 | March 17, 2015 | Eric Nam and Jimin | Madtown |
| 152 | March 24, 2015 | Eric Nam and Jimin | Lovelyz |
| 153 | March 31, 2015 | Eric Nam, Jimin and Kevin | NS Yoon-G |
| 154 (Note: The show premiered a new set, and an opening featuring all three hosts.) | April 7, 2015 | Eric Nam, Jimin and Kevin | Red Velvet |
| 155 | April 14, 2015 | Eric Nam, Jimin and Kevin | K.Will |
| 156 | April 21, 2015 | Amber (f(x)) and Jimin | Niel (Teen Top) |
| 157 | April 28, 2015 | Eric Nam, Jimin and Kevin | BASTARZ |
| 158 | May 5, 2015 | Eric Nam and Jimin | BTS |
| 159 | May 12, 2015 | Eric Nam, Jimin and Kevin | UNIQ |
| 160 | May 19, 2015 | Eric Nam, Jimin and Kevin | Sung-kyu (INFINITE) |
| 161 | May 26, 2015 | Eric Nam, Jimin and Kevin | Monsta X |
| 162 | June 2, 2015 | Eric Nam, Jimin and Kevin | CLC |
| 163 | June 9, 2015 | Eric Nam, Jimin and Kevin | Cross Gene |
| 164 | June 16, 2015 | Eric Nam, Jimin and Kevin | N.Flying |
| 165 | June 23, 2015 | Eric Nam, Jimin and Kevin | Baekhyun and Kai (EXO) |
| 166 | June 30, 2015 | Eric Nam, Jimin and Kevin | Seventeen |
| 167 (Note: Jimin's Birthday episode.) | July 7, 2015 | Eric Nam, Jimin and Kevin | Got7 (Mark, Jackson) |
| 168 | July 14, 2015 | Eric Nam, Jimin and Kevin | Girl's Day |
| 169 | July 21, 2015 | Eric Nam, Jimin and Kevin | Mamamoo |
| 170 (Note: Jackson wasn't able to attend.) | July 28, 2015 | Eric Nam, Jimin and Kevin | GOT7 |
| 171 (Note: ASC BFF Special (Pre-recorded)) | August 4, 2015 | Eric Nam, Jimin and Kevin | Amber (f(x)), Peniel (BtoB) |
| 172 (Note: ASC Mid-Year Special (Pre-recorded)) | August 11, 2015 | Eric Nam, Jimin and Kevin | None |
| 173 | August 18, 2015 | Eric Nam and Jimin | B1A4 |
| 174 | August 25, 2015 | Eric Nam and Jimin | VIXX LR |
| 175 | September 1, 2015 | Eric Nam and Jimin | Sonamoo |
| 176 | September 8, 2015 | Eric Nam, Jimin and Kevin | BIGSTAR |
| 177 | September 15, 2015 | Jimin and Peniel (BtoB) | Monsta X |
| 178 | September 22, 2015 | Jimin and Kevin | Jessi (Lucky J) |
| 179 | September 29, 2015 | Jimin and Kevin | UP10TION |
| 180 | October 6, 2015 | Eric Nam, Jimin and Kevin | DIA |
| 181 | October 13, 2015 | Eric Nam, Jimin and Kevin | Ailee |
| 182 | October 20, 2015 | Eric Nam, Jimin and Kevin | Got7 |
| 183 | October 27, 2015 | Eric Nam, Jimin and Kevin | Oh My Girl |
| 184 (Note: Jimin wasn't able to attend.) | November 3, 2015 | Eric Nam, Kevin and BamBam (Got7) | Twice |
| 185 | November 10, 2015 | Kevin and Jimin | N.Flying |
| 186 | November 17, 2015 | Eric Nam, Jimin and Kevin | HIGH4 |
| 187 | November 24, 2015 | Eric Nam, Jimin and Kevin | B.A.P |
| 188 | December 1, 2015 | Eric Nam, Jimin and Kevin | Romeo |
| 189 | December 8, 2015 | Eric Nam, Jimin and Kevin | Laboum |
| 190 | December 15, 2015 | Eric Nam and Jimin | 9Muses |
| 191 | December 22, 2015 | Eric Nam and Jimin | BTS |
| 192 | December 29, 2015 | Eric Nam, Jimin and Kevin | None |

=== 2016 ===
List of Episodes (2016)

| Episode | Air Date | MC | Guest |
|---|---|---|---|
| 193 | January 5, 2016 | Eric Nam, Jimin, and Kevin | UP10TION |
| 194 | January 12, 2016 | Jimin and Kevin | Lovelyz |
| 195 | January 19, 2016 | Jimin and Kevin | HALO |
| 196 | January 26, 2016 | Eric Nam, Jimin, and Kevin | Royal Pirates |
| 197 | February 2, 2016 | Eric Nam, Jimin, and Kevin | Cross Gene |
| 198 | February 9, 2016 | Eric Nam, Jimin, and Kevin | Jun (U-KISS), Gyujin (UP10TION), New Sun (Sonamoo), Eunjin (DIA) |
| 199 | February 16, 2016 | Eric Nam, Jimin, and Kevin | GFriend |
| 200 (Note: 200th episode special.) | February 23, 2016 | Eric Nam and Jimin | Yoo Seung Woo |
| 201 | March 1, 2016 | Eric Nam, Jimin, and Kevin | Rainbow |
| 202 | March 8, 2016 | Eric Nam, Jimin, and Kevin | Astro |
| 203 | March 15, 2016 | Eric Nam, Jimin, and Kevin | Cosmic Girls |
| 204 | March 22, 2016 | Eric Nam and Jimin | Fiestar |
| 205 | March 29, 2016 | Eric Nam, Jimin, and Kevin | Got7 |
| 206 | April 5, 2016 | Jimin and Kevin | BtoB |
| 207 (Note: Eric Nam announces his official departure from the show.) | April 12, 2016 | Eric Nam, Jimin, and Kevin | None |
| 208 | April 19, 2016 | Jimin and Kevin | Laboum |
| 209 | April 26, 2016 | Jimin and Kevin | VIXX |
| 210 (Note: Pre-recorded on April 19, 2016) | May 3, 2016 | Jimin and Kevin | KNK |
| 211 (Note: Incheon Airport Special (Pre-recorded on May 3, 2016)) | May 10, 2016 | Jimin and Moon (Royal Pirates) | Jessi |
| 212 (Note: Hyunjoo wasn't able to attend.) | May 17, 2016 | Kevin and Amber (f(x)) | APRIL |
| 213 | May 24, 2016 | Jimin and Kevin | Monsta X |
| 214 | May 31, 2016 | Jimin and Kevin | Jae (Day6) |
| 215 | June 7, 2016 | Jimin and Kevin | Oh My Girl |
| 216 | June 14, 2016 | Jimin and Kevin | U-KISS |
| 217 (Note: Hani wasn't able to attend.) | June 21, 2016 | Kevin and Benji (B.I.G) | EXID |
| 218 (Note: Jae Park is now an ASC official MC.) (Note: Jota wasn't able to attend.) | June 27, 2016 | Kevin Woo, Jimin and Jae Park (Day) | Madtown |
| 219 | July 5, 2016 | Park Ji-min (singer, born 1997) and Jae Park | Astro |
| 220 | July 12, 2016 | Park Ji-min (singer, born 1997) and Jae Park | Romeo |
| 221 (Note: Jae appeared as a guest and MC.) | July 19, 2016 | Park Ji-min (singer, born 1997) and Jae Park | DAY6 |
| 222 (Note: SinB wasn't able to attend.) | July 26, 2016 | Kevin and Jae | GFriend |
| 223 | August 2, 2016 | Jae and Young K (DAY6) | Sonamoo |
| 224 | August 9, 2016 | Kevin, Jimin and Jae | I.O.I Unit |
| 225 | August 16, 2016 | Kevin, Jimin and Jae | UP10TION |
| 226 | August 23, 2016 | Kevin, Jimin and Jae | VIXX |
| 227 | August 30, 2016 | Kevin, Jimin and Jae | LABOUM |
| 228 | September 6, 2016 | Kevin and Jae | Jimin |
| 229 (Note: Jae's Birthday episode.) | September 13, 2016 | Kevin, Jae and Young K (DAY6) | HALO |
| 230 (Note: Yeonjung wasn't able to attend.) | September 20, 2016 | Kevin, Jimin and Jae | Cosmic Girls |
| 231 (Note: L wasn't able to attend.) | September 27, 2016 | Kevin, Jimin and Jae | Infinite |
| 232 | October 4, 2016 | Kevin, Jimin and Jae | Got7 |
| 233 | October 11, 2016 | Kevin, Jimin and Jae | Ailee |
| 234 | October 18, 2016 | Kevin, Jimin and Jae | Pentagon |
| 235 | October 25, 2016 | Kevin, Jimin and Jae | Monsta X |
| 236 | November 1, 2016 | Kevin, Jimin and Jae | Twice |
| 237 | November 8, 2016 | Kevin, Jimin and Jae | SF9 |
| 238 | November 15, 2016 | Jimin and Jae Park | Day6 (Young K, Wonpil) |
| 239 | November 22, 2016 | Jimin and Jae Park | B.A.P |
| 240 | November 29, 2016 | Jimin and Jae Park | Astro |
| 241 | December 6, 2016 | Jimin and Jae Park | KNK |
| 242 | December 13, 2016 | Jimin and Jae Park | Victon |
| 243 | December 20, 2016 | Jimin and Jae Park | Pentagon |
| 244 | December 27, 2016 | Kevin Woo, Jimin and Jae Park | Day6 |

=== 2017 ===
List of Episodes (2017)

| Episode | Air Date | MC | Guest |
|---|---|---|---|
| 245 | January 3, 2017 | Kevin, Jimin and Jae | None |
| 246 (Note: Yeonjung and Mei Qi weren't able to attend.) | January 10, 2017 | Kevin, Jimin and Jae | Cosmic Girls |
| 247 | January 17, 2017 | Kevin, Jimin and Jae | APRIL |
| 248 | January 24, 2017 | Kevin, Jimin and Jae | Niel (Teen Top) |
| 249 | January 31, 2017 | Kevin, Jimin and Jae | CLC |
| 250 (Note: Joy wasn't able to attend.) | February 7, 2017 | Kevin, Jimin and Jae | Red Velvet |
| 251 | February 14, 2017 | Kevin, Jimin and Jae | Cross Gene |
| 252 | February 21, 2017 | Jimin and Jae | SF9 |
| 253 | February 28, 2017 | Kevin, Jimin and Jae | K.A.R.D |
| 254 | March 7, 2017 | Kevin, Jimin and Jae | Bigflo |
| 255 | March 14, 2017 | Jimin and Jae Park | Victon |
| 256 | March 21, 2017 | Jimin and Jae Park | Got7 |
| 257 (Note: New format debut.) | March 28, 2017 | Kevin Woo, Jimin and Jae Park | GFriend |
| 258 | April 4, 2017 | Kevin Woo, Jimin and Jae Park | Romeo |
| 259 | April 11, 2017 | Kevin Woo, Jimin and Jae Park | Monsta X |
| 260 | April 18, 2017 | Jae and Young K (DAY6) | Dreamcatcher |
| 261 | April 25, 2017 | Jimin, Jae and BM (K.A.R.D) | Seven O'Clock |
| 262 | May 2, 2017 | Kevin, Jimin and Jae | Junggigo |
| 263 | May 9, 2017 | Kevin, Jimin and Jae | Unit Black |
| 264 | May 16, 2017 | Kevin, Jimin and Jae | Snuper |
| 265 | May 23, 2017 | Jae and BM (K.A.R.D) | BONUSbaby |
| 266 | May 30, 2017 | Kevin, Jimin and Jae | KNK |
| 267 | June 6, 2017 | Kevin, Jimin and Jae | DAY6 |
| 268 | June 13, 2017 | Kevin, Jimin and Jae | B.I.G |
| 269 | June 20, 2017 | Kevin, Jimin and Jae | Chungha |
| 270 | June 27, 2017 | Kevin, Jimin and Jae | APRIL |
| 271 (Note: Yan An wasn't able to attend.) | July 4, 2017 | Kevin, Jimin and Jae | Pentagon |
| 272 (Note: Wooshin and Hwanhee weren't able to attend.) | July 11, 2017 | Kevin and Jae | UP10TION |
| 273 (Note: Jae wasn't able to attend.) (Note: Pre-recorded on July 10, 2017.) | July 18, 2017 | Kevin and BM (K.A.R.D) | HALO |
| 274 | July 25, 2017 | Kevin and Jae | K.A.R.D |
| 275 | August 1, 2017 | Kevin and Jae | MYTEEN |
| 276 | August 8, 2017 | Kevin and Jae | The East Light |
| 277 | August 15, 2017 | Kevin and Jae | Samuel |
| 278 | August 22, 2017 | Jae and Young K (DAY6) | ONF |
| 279 | August 29, 2017 | Kevin and Jae | Weki Meki |
| 280 (Note: Pre-recorded on August 29, 2017.) | September 5, 2017 | Kevin and Jae | MXM |
| 281 | September 12, 2017 | Kevin, Jimin and Jae | B.A.P |
| 282 | September 19, 2017 | Kevin, Jimin and Jae | Jeong Se-woon |
| 283 | September 26, 2017 | Kevin, Jimin and Jae | Golden Child |
| 284 (Note: Pre-recorded on September 26, 2017.) | October 3, 2017 | Kevin, Jimin and Jae | None |
| 285 | October 10, 2017 | Kevin, Jimin and Jae | APRIL |
| 286 (Note: Hyunbin wasn't able to attend.) | October 17, 2017 | Kevin, Jimin and Jae | JBJ |
| 287 | October 24, 2017 | Kevin and Jimin | BtoB |
| 288 | October 31, 2017 | Kevin and Jimin | Hyeongseop X Euiwoong |
| 289 | November 7, 2017 | Kevin and Jimin | TRCNG |
| 290 | November 14, 2017 | Kevin, Jimin and Jae | Monsta X |
| 291 | November 21, 2017 | Kevin, Jimin and Jae | Astro |
| 292 | November 28, 2017 | Kevin, Jimin and Jae | IN2IT |
| 293 | December 5, 2017 | Kevin, Jimin and Jae | K.A.R.D |
| 294 | December 12, 2017 | Kevin, Jimin and Jae | The Boyz |
| 295 | December 19, 2017 | Kevin, Jimin and Jae | DAY6 |
| 296 | December 26, 2017 | Kevin, Jimin and Jae | Soyou |

=== 2018 ===
List of Episodes (2018)

| Episode | Air Date | MC | Guest |
|---|---|---|---|
| 297 | January 2, 2018 | Kevin, Jimin and Kevin (The Boyz) | Dreamcatcher |
| 298 | January 9, 2018 | Kevin, Jimin and Jae | Momoland |
| 299 | January 16, 2018 | Kevin, Jimin and Jae | MXM |
| 300 (Note: 300th episode special.) | January 23, 2018 | Kevin, Jimin and Jae | Eric Nam |
| 301 | January 30, 2018 | Kevin, Jimin and Jae | JBJ |
| 302 | February 6, 2018 | Kevin, Jimin and Jae | Jeong Se-woon |
| 303 | February 13, 2018 | Kevin, Jimin and Jae | Kriesha Chu |
| 304 | February 20, 2018 | Kevin, Jimin and Jae | Gugudan |
| 305 | February 27, 2018 | Kevin, Jimin and Jae | Weki Meki |
| 306 | March 6, 2018 | Kevin, Jimin and Jae | Rainz |
| 307 | March 13, 2018 | Kevin, Jimin and Jae | Golden Child |
| 308 | March 20, 2018 | Kevin, Jimin and Jae | WJSN |
| 309 (Note: UP10TION was supposed to guest on this episode but after the death of their labelmate Seo Min-woo they decided to cancel all their activities for the week to pay their last respect.) | March 27, 2018 | Kevin and Jae | Day6 (Wonpil and Dowoon) |
| 310 | April 3, 2018 | Kevin and Jae | Stray Kids |
| 311 (Note: Kevin Woo's last episode as the Main MC.) | April 10, 2018 | Kevin and Jae | Pentagon |
| 312 (Note: After School Club's 5th Anniversary Special.) (Note: Kevin Woo's graduation ceremony.) | April 17, 2018 | Jae and Young K Day6 | Kevin Woo |
| 313 (Note: Pre-recorded on April 10.) | April 24, 2018 | Jae and Young K Day6 | The East Light |
| 314 (Note: Hwall wasn't able to attend.) | May 1, 2018 | Jimin and Jae | The Boyz |
| 315 (Note: Jaeyong wasn't able to attend.) | May 8, 2018 | Jimin and Jae | HALO |
| 316 | May 15, 2018 | Jimin and Jae | Snuper |
| 317 (Note: Pre-recorded on May 15, 2018.) | May 22, 2018 | Jimin and Jae | (G)I-dle |
| 318 | May 29, 2018 | Jimin and Jae | Stray Kids |
| 319 | June 5, 2018 | Jimin and Jae | Victon |
| 320 (Note: Pre-recorded on June 12, 2018.) (Note: Show aired on a Wednesday at 1am KST.) | June 13, 2018 | Jimin and Bang Chan (Stray Kids) | Woo Jin-young, Kim Hyun-soo |
| 321 | June 19, 2018 | Jimin and Jae | KHAN |
| 322 | June 26, 2018 | Jimin and Jae | 24K |
| 323 | July 3, 2018 | Jimin and Jae | Day6 |
| 324 (Note: Jae's last episode as the Main MC.) | July 10, 2018 | Jimin and Jae | Elris |
| 325 (Note: Jae's graduation ceremony) | July 17, 2018 | Jimin and Bang Chan | Jae Day6 |
| 326 (Note: Seungmin and Heejun's first episode as Main MCs) | July 24, 2018 | Jimin, Seungmin and Heejun | Jeong Se-woon |
| 327 | July 31, 2018 | Jimin, Seungmin and Heejun | K.A.R.D |
| 328 | August 7, 2018 | Jimin, Seungmin and Heejun | Chungha |
| 329 | August 14, 2018 | Jimin, Seungmin and Heejun | Stray Kids |
| 330 | August 21, 2018 | Jimin, Seungmin and Heejun | MXM |
| 331 | August 28, 2018 | Jimin, Seungmin and Heejun | LABOUM |
| 332 (Note: Jimin Park appeared as a guest.) | September 4, 2018 | Seungmin and Heejun | Jimin |
| 333 | September 11, 2018 | Jimin, Seungmin and Heejun | Nature |
| 334 (Note: Pre-recorded on September 12, 2018.) (Note: Kim Seung-min wasn't able to attend.) | September 22, 2018 | Jimin and Heejun | 100% |
| 335 (Note: Pre-recorded on September 11, 2018.) (Note: ASC Chuseok Special) | September 25, 2018 | Jimin, Seungmin and Heejun | Loona |
| 336 (Note: YooA and Jiho are absent.) | October 2, 2018 | Jimin and Heejun | Oh My Girl |
| 337 | October 9, 2018 | Jimin, Seungmin and Heejun | Martin Smith |
| 338 | October 16, 2018 | Jimin, Seungmin and Heejun | Seven O'Clock |
| 339 | October 23, 2018 | Seungmin and Heejun | Nakjoon |
| 340 (Note: Seungmin appeared as a guest.) | October 30, 2018 | Jimin and Heejun | Stray Kids |
| 341 | November 6, 2018 | Jimin, Seungmin and Heejun | fromis 9 |
| 342 | November 13, 2018 | Jimin, Seungmin and Heejun | Golden Child |
| 343 (Note: Heejun appeared as a guest) | November 20, 2018 | Jimin and Seungmin | Heejun |
| 344 (Note: JBJ95 only.) | November 27, 2018 | Jimin, Seungmin and Heejun | JBJ |
| 345 | December 4, 2018 | Jimin, Seungmin and Heejun | Baek A-yeon |
| 346 | December 11, 2018 | Jimin and Heejun | Up10tion |
| 347 | December 18, 2018 | Jimin, Seungmin and Heejun | DreamNote |
| 348 (Note: Seungmin's last episode as the Main MC.) | December 25, 2018 | Jimin, Seungmin and Heejun | Felix (Stray Kids), Woodz, Woosung (The Rose) |

=== 2019 ===
List of Episodes (2019)

| Episode | Air Date | MC | Guest |
|---|---|---|---|
| 349 | January 1, 2019 | Jimin and Heejun | A.C.E |
| 350 | January 8, 2019 | Jimin and Heejun | Kevin Woo |
| 351 (Note: Han Hee-jun wasn't able to attend.) | January 15, 2019 | Jimin | KNK |
| 352 (Note: Xuanyi, Cheng Xiao, Meiqi and Yeonjung are absent.) | January 22, 2019 | Jimin and Peniel | WJSN |
| 353 | January 29, 2019 | Jimin and Heejun | GFriend |
| 354 | February 5, 2019 | Jimin and Heejun | VAV |
| 355 | February 12, 2019 | Jimin and Heejun | NATURE |
| 356 | February 19, 2019 | Jimin and Heejun | ONF |
| 357 | February 26, 2019 | Jimin and Heejun | Seven O'Clock |
| 358 | March 5, 2019 | Jimin and Heejun | Imfact |
| 359 | March 12, 2019 | Jimin and Heejun | TREI |
| 360 | March 19, 2019 | Jimin and Heejun | 100% |
| 361 | March 26, 2019 | Jimin, Heejun, and Woosung (The Rose) | TXT |
| 362 | April 2, 2019 | Jimin, Heejun, and Woosung (The Rose) | GWSN |
| 363 | April 9, 2019 | Jimin, Heejun, and Woosung (The Rose) | Stray Kids |
| 364 | April 16, 2019 | Jimin, Heejun, and Woosung (The Rose) | DAY6 |
| 365 | April 23, 2019 | Jimin, Heejun, and Woosung (The Rose) | BVNDIT |
| 366 | April 30, 2019 | Jimin, Heejun, and Woosung (The Rose) | 1TEAM |
| 367 | May 7, 2019 | Heejun and Woosung (The Rose) | NewKidd |
| 368 | May 14, 2019 | Heejun and Woosung (The Rose) | Eric Nam |
| 369 | May 21, 2019 | Jimin, Heejun and Woosung (The Rose) | Weki Meki |
| 370 | May 28, 2019 | Jimin, Heejun and Woosung (The Rose) | Ladies' Code |
| 371 | June 4, 2019 | Jimin, Heejun and Woosung (The Rose) | AB6IX |
| 372 | June 11, 2019 | Jimin, Heejun and Woosung (The Rose) | WJSN |
| 373 | June 18, 2019 | Jimin, Heejun and Woosung (The Rose) | ONEUS |
| 374 | June 25, 2019 | Jimin and Heejun | ATEEZ |
| 375 | July 2, 2019 | Jimin, Heejun and Woosung (The Rose) | OnlyOneOf |
| 376 | July 9, 2019 | Jimin and Heejun | A.C.E |
| 377 | July 16, 2019 | Jimin, Heejun and Woosung (The Rose) | NOIR |
| 378 | July 23, 2019 | Jimin and Woosung (The Rose) | KNK |
| 379 | July 30, 2019 | Jimin and Heejun | Woosung (The Rose) |
| 380 | August 6, 2019 | Jimin and Woosung (The Rose) | PENTAGON |
| 381 | August 13, 2019 | Jimin and Heejun | The Rose |
| 382 | August 20, 2019 | Jimin, Heejun and Woosung (The Rose) | VAV |
| 383 | August 27, 2019 | Jimin and Heejun | Rocket Punch |
| 384 | September 3, 2019 | Jimin and Heejun | JBJ95 |
| 385 | September 10, 2019 | Jimin and Heejun | EVERGLOW |
| 386 | September 17, 2019 | Heejun and Ashley | ONEWE |
| 387 | September 24, 2019 | Jimin, Heejun and Woosung (The Rose) | Laboum |
| 388 | October 1, 2019 | Jimin, Heejun and Woosung (The Rose) | TEEN TEEN |
| 389 | October 8, 2019 | Jimin, Heejun and Woosung (The Rose) | ONF |
| 390 | October 15, 2019 | Jimin, Heejun and Woosung (The Rose) | Jeong Se-woon |
| 391 | October 22, 2019 | Jimin, Heejun and Woosung (The Rose) | AB6IX |
| 392 | October 29, 2019 | Jimin, Heejun and Woosung (The Rose) | Jung Dae-hyun |
| 393 | November 5, 2019 | Jimin and Heejun | Ladies' Code |
| 394 | November 12, 2019 | Jimin and Heejun | TXT |
| 395 | November 19, 2019 | Jimin and Heejun | Victon |
| 396 | November 28, 2019 | Jimin and Heejun | 1Team |
| 397 | December 3, 2019 | Jimin and Woosung (The Rose) | Hinapia |
| 398 | December 10, 2019 | Jimin, Heejun and Woosung (The Rose) | Stray Kids |
| 399 | December 17, 2019 | Jimin and Heejun | JxR |
| 400 | December 24, 2019 | Jimin, Heejun and Woosung (The Rose) | ONF |
| 401 | December 31, 2019 | Jimin, Heejun and Woosung (The Rose) | The Rose |

=== 2020 ===
List of Episodes (2020)

| Episode | Air Date | MC | Guest |
|---|---|---|---|
| 402 | January 7, 2020 | Jimin and Heejun | BDC |
| 403 | January 14, 2020 | Heejun | Momoland |
| 404 | January 21, 2020 | Jimin and Heejun | Dongkiz |
| 405 | January 28, 2020 | Jimin and Heejun | Verivery |
| 406 | February 4, 2020 | Jimin and Heejun | Golden Child |
| 407 | February 11, 2020 | Jimin and Heejun | Bvndit |
| 408 | February 18, 2020 | Jimin and Heejun | Loona |
| 409 | February 25, 2020 | Jimin and Heejun | Everglow |
| 410 | March 3, 2020 | Jimin, Heejun, and Yuri | Weki Meki |
| 411 | March 10, 2020 | Jimin, Heejun, and Yuri | Dreamcatcher |
| 412 | March 17, 2020 | Heejun, Yuri, and Ashley | MCND |
| 413 | March 24, 2020 | Jimin, Heejun, and Yuri | Victon |
| 414 | March 31, 2020 | Jimin, Heejun, and Yuri | Elris |
| 415 | April 7, 2020 | Jimin, Heejun, and Yuri | Favorite |
| 416 | April 14, 2020 | Jimin, Heejun, and Yuri | Cignature |
| 417 | April 21, 2020 | Jimin, Heejun, and Yuri | Kevin Woo and BM (Kard) |
| 418 | April 28, 2020 | Jimin, Heejun, and Yuri | Cravity |
| 419 | May 5, 2020 | Jimin, Heejun, and Yuri | Astro |
| 420 | May 12, 2020 | Jimin, Heejun, and Yuri | Noir |
| 421 | May 19, 2020 | Jimin, Heejun, and Yuri | GWSN |
| 422 | May 26, 2020 | Jimin, Heejun, and Yuri | Fanatics |
| 423 | June 2, 2020 | Jimin, Heejun, and Yuri | D-Crunch |
| 424 | June 9, 2020 | Jimin, Heejun, and Yuri | TXT |
| 425 | June 16, 2020 | Jimin, Heejun, and Yuri | Onewe |
| 426 | June 23, 2020 | Heejun, Yuri, and Ashley | WJSN |
| 427 | June 30, 2020 | Jamie, Heejun, and Yuri | Stray Kids |
| 428 | July 7, 2020 | Jamie, Heejun, and Yuri | Nature |
| 429 | July 14, 2020 | Jamie, Heejun, and Yuri | D1ce |
| 430 | July 21, 2020 | Jamie, Heejun, and Yuri | AB6IX |
| 431 | July 28, 2020 | Jamie, Heejun, and Yuri | Verivery |
| 432 | August 4, 2020 | Jamie, Heejun, and Yuri | TOO |
| 433 | August 11, 2020 | Jamie, Heejun, and Yuri | (G)I-dle |
| 434 | August 18, 2020 | Jamie, Heejun, and Yuri | ONF |
| 435 | August 25, 2020 | Jamie, Heejun, and Yuri | 1Team |
| 436 | September 1, 2020 | Jamie and Heejun | Even of Day |
| 437 | September 8, 2020 | Jamie and Heejun | A.C.E |
| 438 | September 15, 2020 | Jamie and Heejun | Cravity |
| 439 | September 22, 2020 | Jamie and Heejun | B.O.Y |
| 440 | September 29, 2020 | Jamie and Heejun | The Boyz |
| 441 | October 6, 2020 | Jamie and Heejun | Everglow |
| 442 | October 13, 2020 | Jamie, Heejun, and Jaeyun | Ghost9 |
| 443 | October 20, 2020 | Jamie, Heejun, and Jaeyun | Cignature |
| 444 | October 27, 2020 | Jamie, Heejun, and Jaeyun | BDC |
| 445 | November 3, 2020 | Kevin Woo | Jaeyun, J.You, Jerome and Woonggi (TO1), Jamie, Heejun |
| 446 | November 10, 2020 | Jamie, Heejun, and Jaeyun | TXT |
| 447 | November 17, 2020 | Jamie, Heejun, and Jaeyun | CIX |
| 448 | November 24, 2020 | Jamie, Heejun, and Jaeyun | Drippin |
| 427 (re-run) (Note: Originally supposed to be aired live with STAYC as guests, but has been canceled due to COVID-19 concerns. It has since been postponed to December 15, 2020.) | December 1, 2020 | Jamie, Heejun, and Yuri | Stray Kids |
| 449 (Note: Sora is absent.) | December 8, 2020 | Jamie, Heejun, and Jaeyun | woo!ah! |
| 450 | December 15, 2020 | Jamie, Heejun, and Jaeyun | STAYC |
| 451 | December 22, 2020 | Jamie, Heejun, and Jaeyun | Onewe |
| 452 | December 29, 2020 | Jamie, Heejun, and Jaeyun | Enhypen |

=== 2021 ===
List of Episodes (2021)

| Episode | Air Date | MC | Guest |
|---|---|---|---|
| 453 | January 5, 2021 | Jamie, Heejun, Jaeyun | WEi |
| 454 | January 12, 2021 | Heejun, Jaeyun | MCND |
| 455 | January 19, 2021 | Jamie, Heejun, Jaeyun | Victon |
| 456 | January 26, 2021 | Jamie, Jaeyun | Oneus |
| 457 | February 2, 2021 | Jamie, Heejun, Jaeyun | DKB |
| 458 | February 9, 2021 | Jamie, Jaeyun | Dreamcatcher |
| 459 | February 16, 2021 | Jamie, Heejun, Jaeyun | CIX |
| 460 | February 23, 2021 | Jamie, Heejun, Jaeyun | U-KISS Soohyun and Hoon |
| | March 2, 2021 | Cancelled | Cancelled |
| 461 | March 9, 2021 | Heejun, Jaeyun | ONF |
| 462 | March 16, 2021 | Heejun, Jaeyun | Verivery |
| 463 | March 23, 2021 | Heejun, Jaeyun | BDC |
| 464 | March 30, 2021 | Heejun, Ashley | Weeekly |
| 465 | April 6, 2021 | Heejun, Ashley | Ciipher |
| 466 | April 13, 2021 | Heejun, Jaeyun | Purple Kiss |
| 467 | April 20, 2021 | Jamie, Heejun, Jaeyun | STAYC |
| 468 | April 27, 2021 | Jamie, Jaeyun | Yoon Ji-sung |
| 469 | May 4, 2021 | Jamie, Heejun, Jaeyun | Dongkiz |
| 470 | May 11, 2021 | Jamie, Heejun, Jaeyun | AB6IX |
| 471 | May 18, 2021 | Jamie, Heejun, Jaeyun | Enhypen |
| 472 | May 25, 2021 | Jamie, Heejun, Jaeyun | Oneus |
| 473 | June 1, 2021 | Heejun, Byeongkwan | TO1 |
| 474 | June 8, 2021 | Heejun, Jaeyun | Tomorrow X Together |
| 475 | June 15, 2021 | Jamie, Heejun, Jaeyun | Everglow |
| 476 | June 22, 2021 | Jamie, Heejun, Jaeyun | Epex |
| 477 | June 29, 2021 | Jamie, Jaeyun | Lightsum |
| 478 | July 6, 2021 | Jamie, Heejun, Jaeyun | Kim Woosung |
| 479 | July 13, 2021 | Jamie, Jaeyun | A.C.E |
| 480 | July 20, 2021 | Heejun, Jaeyun | Onewe |
| 481 | July 27, 2021 | Jamie, Heejun, Jaeyun | Just B |
| 482 | August 3, 2021 | Jaeyun, Byeongkwan | Dreamcatcher |
| 483 | August 10, 2021 | Jamie, Heejun, Jaeyun | 777 (Triple 7) (B.I.G & 3YE) |
| 484 | August 17, 2021 | Jamie, Heejun, Jaeyun | ONF |
| 485 | August 24, 2021 | Jamie, Heejun, Jaeyun | The Boyz |
| 486 | August 31, 2021 | Jamie, Heejun, Jaeyun | Stray Kids |
| 487 | September 7, 2021 | Jaeyun, Byeongkwan | Cravity |
| 488 | September 14, 2021 | Jamie, Jaeyun, Byeongkwan | Verivery |
| 489 | September 21, 2021 | Jamie, Jaeyun, Byeongkwan | MCND |
| 490 | September 28, 2021 | Byeongkwan | Purple Kiss |
| 491 | October 5, 2021 | Jamie, Jaeyun | Ciipher |
| 492 | October 12, 2021 | Jamie, Jaeyun | Mirae |
| 493 | October 19, 2021 | Jamie, Jaeyun, Byeongkwan | Jo Yu-ri |
| 494 | October 26, 2021 | Jamie, Jaeyun, Byeongkwan | Lightsum |
| 495 | November 2, 2021 | Jamie, Byeongkwan | Tri.be |
| 496 | November 9, 2021 | Jaeyun, Byeongkwan | Epex |
| 497 | November 16, 2021 | Jamie, Jaeyun, Byeongkwan | DKB |
| 498 | November 23, 2021 | Jamie, Jaeyun, Byeongkwan | Just B |
| 499 | November 30, 2021 | Jamie, Jaeyun | TO1 |
| 500 | December 7, 2021 | Jamie, Jaeyun, Byeongkwan | Cignature |
| 501 | December 14, 2021 | Jamie, Jaeyun, Byeongkwan | Oneus |
| 502 | December 21, 2021 | Jaeyun, Byeongkwan | Everglow |
| 503 | December 28, 2021 | Jamie, Jaeyun, Byeongkwan | Xdinary Heroes |

=== 2022 ===
List of Episodes (2022)

| Episode | Air Date | MC | Guest |
|---|---|---|---|
| 504 | January 4, 2022 | Jaeyun and Byeongkwan | Up10tion |
| 505 | January 11, 2022 | Jaeyun and Byeongkwan | Onewe |
| 506 | January 18, 2022 | Jaeyun and Byeongkwan | WJSN Chocome |
| 507 | January 25, 2022 | Jamie, Byeongkwan, Kevin Woo | Jinjin & Rocky |
| 508 (Note: Pre-recorded on January 17, 2022.) | February 1, 2022 | Jaeyun, Jamie, Byeongkwan | Momoland |
| 509 | February 8, 2022 | Byeongkwan and Kevin Woo | Jamie |
| 510 | February 15, 2022 | Jamie, Byeongkwan, Jaeyun | Omega X |
| 511 | February 22, 2022 | Jaeyun and Byeongkwan | Luminous |
| 512 | March 1, 2022 | Byeongkwan, Jaeyun, Jamie | TO1 (Donggeon, Jisu, Minsu, Kyungho) |
| 513 | March 8, 2022 | Byeongkwan, Jaeyun, Jamie | Rocket Punch |
| 514 | March 15, 2022 | Byeongkwan, Jaeyun, Jamie | Tempest |
| 515 (Note: Byeongkwan's graduation episode) | March 22, 2022 | Byeongkwan, Jaeyun, Jamie | - |
| 516 (Note: Due to a last minute announcement, Taeyoung was the special MC) | March 29, 2022 | Allen and Taeyoung | WEi |
| 517 | April 5, 2022 | Jaeyun, Allen, Jamie | Cravity |
| 518 | April 12, 2022 | Jaeyun and Allen | Billlie |
| 519 | April 19, 2022 | Jaeyun, Allen, Jamie | DKZ |
| 520 | April 26, 2022 | Jaeyun, Allen, Jamie | Epex |
| 521 | May 3, 2022 | Jaeyun, Allen, Jamie | Younite |
| 522 | May 10, 2022 | Jaeyun, Allen, Jamie | Verivery |
| 523 | May 17, 2022 | Jaeyun and Jamie | DKB |
| 524 | May 24, 2022 | Jaeyun, Allen, Jamie | E'Last |
| 525 | May 31, 2022 | Jaeyun, Allen, Jamie | Oneus |
| 526 | June 7, 2022 | Jaeyun, Allen, Jamie | TNX |
| 527 | June 14, 2022 | Jaeyun, Allen, Jamie | Victon |
| 528 (Note: Jaeyun's graduation episode) | June 21, 2022 | Jaeyun, Allen, Jamie | Secret Number |
| 529 (Note: Yechan was the special MC) | June 28, 2022 | |Yechan and Jamie | Omega X |
| 530 | July 5, 2022 | Allen and Jamie | Drippin |
| 531 (Note: Bernard Park, Yechan and Junghoon were the special MCs) | July 12, 2022 | Bernard Park, Yechan, Junghoon | Fromis 9 |
| 532 | July 19, 2022 | Allen and Taeyoung | TAN |
| 533 | July 26, 2022 | Jamie, Allen, Aaron | MCND |
| 534 | August 2, 2022 | Aaron | Blitzers |
| | August 9, 2022 (Note: Cancelled due to a system problem caused by heavy rain) | Cancelled | Cancelled |
| 535 (Note: Jamie's graduation episode) (Note: Seok Rakwon wasn't able to attend) | August 16, 2022 | Jamie and Yechan | ATBO |
| 536 | August 23, 2022 | Aaron | Purple Kiss |
| 537 | August 30, 2022 | Aaron | Tri.be |
| 538 | September 6, 2022 | Allen, Aaron, Taeyoung | CIX |
| 539 (Note: The ASC 100 Final) | September 13, 2022 | Allen, Aaron, Taeyoung | TAN (Changsun and Jooan), E'Last (Choi In and Won Hyuk), Drippin (Dongyun and Changuk) and Victon's Sejun |
| 540 | September 20, 2022 | Allen, Aaron, Taeyoung | Rocket Punch |
| 541 | September 27, 2022 | Aaron | Billlie |
| 542 | October 4, 2022 | Allen, Aaron, Taeyoung | Cravity |
| 543 | October 11, 2022 | Allen, Aaron, Taeyoung | Mirae |
| 544 | October 18, 2022 | Aaron | Luminous |
| 545 | October 25, 2022 | Allen, Aaron, Taeyoung | DKZ |
| 546 (Note: Pre-recorded on November 1, 2022.) (Note: Hyunyeop wasn't able to attend) | November 6, 2022 | Allen, Aaron, Taeyoung | TAN |
| 547 (Note: Yunjin wasn't able to attend) | November 8, 2022 | Allen, Aaron, Taeyoung | Le Sserafim |
| 548 | November 15, 2022 | Allen, Aaron, Taeyoung | Epex |
| 549 | November 22, 2022 | Allen, Aaron, Taeyoung | ATBO |
| 550 (Note: Minchan wasn't able to attend) | November 29, 2022 | Allen, Aaron, Taeyoung | Verivery |
| 551 | December 6, 2022 | Allen, Aaron, Taeyoung | Tempest |
| 552 | December 13, 2022 | Aaron | Drippin |
| 553 | December 20, 2022 | Allen, Aaron, Taeyoung | Lucy |
| 554 (Note: MC Special) | December 27, 2022 | Allen, Aaron, Taeyoung | - |

=== 2023 ===
List of Episodes (2023)

| Episode | Air Date | MC | Guest |
|---|---|---|---|
| 555 | January 3, 2023 | Allen, Aaron, Taeyoung | TripleS |
| 556 (Note: Winnie, Seowon and Jiho weren't able to attend due to their participation on Boys Planet) | January 10, 2023 | Allen, Aaron, Taeyoung | NINE.i |
| 557 | January 17, 2023 | Allen, Aaron, Taeyoung | N.SSign |
| 558 (Note: Pre-recorded on January 17) | January 24, 2023 | Allen, Aaron, Taeyoung | H1-Key |
| 559 | January 31, 2023 | Allen, Aaron, Taeyoung | Cignature |
| 560 | February 7, 2023 | Allen, Aaron, Taeyoung | 8Turn |
| 561 | February 14, 2023 | Allen, Taeyoung | Aimers |
| 562 | February 21, 2023 | Allen, Aaron, Taeyoung | The Boyz (Jacob and Kevin) |
| 563 | February 28, 2023 | Allen, Aaron, Taeyoung | Purple Kiss |
| 564 (Note: Junhyeok wasn't able to attend) | March 7, 2023 | Allen, Aaron, Taeyoung | The New Six |
| 565 | March 14, 2023 | Allen, Aaron, Taeyoung | Cravity |
| 566 | March 21, 2023 | Allen, Aaron, Taeyoung | TAN |
| 567 | March 28, 2023 | Allen, Aaron, Taeyoung | Nicole Jung |
| 568 | April 4, 2023 | Allen, Aaron, Taeyoung | Kingdom |
| 569 | April 11, 2023 | Allen, Aaron, Taeyoung | Billlie |
| 570 | April 18, 2023 | Allen, Aaron, Taeyoung | Trendz |
| 571 | April 25, 2023 | Allen, Aaron, Taeyoung | CSR |
| 572 | May 2, 2023 | Allen, Aaron, Taeyoung | Omega X |
| 573 | May 9, 2023 | Allen, Aaron, Taeyoung | Drippin |
| 574 | May 16, 2023 | Allen, Taeyoung | Epex |
| 575 | May 23, 2023 | Allen, Aaron, Taeyoung | Blitzers |
| 576 (Note: Ryu Junmin and Kim Yeonkyu weren't able to attend) | May 30, 2023 | Allen, Aaron, Taeyoung | ATBO |
| 577 (Note: Pre-recorded on May 30) | June 6, 2023 | Allen, Aaron, Taeyoung | +(KR)ystal Eyes |
| 578 | June 13, 2023 | Allen, Aaron, Taeyoung | CIX |
| 579 (Note: Junhyeok wasn't able to attend) | June 20, 2023 | Aaron | The New Six |
| 580 | June 27, 2023 | Aaron | DKB |
| 581 | July 4, 2023 | Aaron | Lun8 |
| 582 | July 11, 2023 | Allen, Aaron, Taeyoung | Xodiac |
| 583 (Note: MC Special) | July 18, 2023 | Allen, Aaron, Taeyoung | - |
| 584 | July 25, 2023 | Allen, Aaron, Taeyoung | Kiss of Life |
| 585 (Note: Junhyuk wasn't able to attend) | August 1, 2023 | Allen, Aaron, Taeyoung | Mirae |
| 586 (Note: Pre-recorded on August 1) | August 8, 2023 | Aaron | 8Turn |
| 587 | August 15, 2023 | Aaron | The Boyz (Jacob and Kevin) |
| 588 | August 22, 2023 | Aaron | Lucy |
| 589 | August 29, 2023 | Allen, Aaron, Taeyoung | Vanner |
| 590 | September 5, 2023 | Allen, Aaron, Taeyoung | Secret Number |
| 591 (Note: Belle wasn't able to attend) | September 12, 2023 | Allen, Aaron, Taeyoung | Cignature |
| 592 | September 19, 2023 | Allen, Aaron, Taeyoung | BoyNextDoor |
| 593 | September 26, 2023 | Allen, Aaron, Taeyoung | Evnne |
| 594 | October 3, 2023 | Allen, Aaron, Taeyoung | Tempest |
| 595 | October 10, 2023 | Allen, Aaron, Taeyoung | ONF |
| 596 | October 17, 2023 | Allen, Aaron, Taeyoung | Pow |
| 597 (Note: Seongmin wasn't able to attend) | October 24, 2023 | Allen, Aaron, Taeyoung | Cravity |
| 598 | October 31, 2023 | Allen, Aaron, Taeyoung | Younite |
| 599 | November 7, 2023 | Allen, Aaron, Taeyoung | Ghost9 |
| 600 | November 14, 2023 | Allen, Aaron, Taeyoung | Weeekly |
| 601 | November 21, 2023 | Allen, Aaron, Taeyoung | WHIB |
| 602 | November 28, 2023 | Allen, Aaron, Taeyoung | Kiss Of Life |
| 603 (Note: Jeong Seunghwan wasn't able to attend) | December 5, 2023 | Allen, Aaron, Taeyoung | ATBO |
| 604 (Note: Jay Chang wasn't able to attend.) | December 12, 2023 | Allen, Aaron, Taeyoung | One Pact |
| 605 | December 19, 2023 | Aaron | DKB |
| 606 | December 26, 2023 | Aaron | Tiot |

=== 2024 ===
List of Episodes (2024)

| Episode | Air Date | MC | Guest |
|---|---|---|---|
| 607 | January 2, 2024 | Allen, Aaron, Taeyoung | Xodiac |
| 608 | January 9, 2024 | Allen, Aaron, Taeyoung | 8Turn |
| 609 | January 16, 2024 | Allen, Aaron, Taeyoung | Jeong Sewoon |
| 610 | January 23, 2024 | Allen, Aaron, Taeyoung | All(H)Ours |
| 611 | January 30, 2024 | Allen, Aaron, Taeyoung | Evnne |
| 612 | February 6, 2024 | Allen, Aaron, Taeyoung | AB6IX |
| 613 (Note: An Chanwon wasn't able to attend) | February 13, 2024 | Allen, Aaron, Taeyoung | The Wind |
| 614 | February 20, 2024 | Allen, Aaron, Taeyoung | Dxmon |
| 615 | February 27, 2024 | Allen, Aaron, Taeyoung | Vanner |
| 616 (Note: Kang Yuchan wasn't able to attend) | March 5, 2024 | Allen, Aaron, Taeyoung | A.C.E |
| 617 | March 12, 2024 | Aaron | M.O.N.T |
| 618 (Note: Junghoon wasn't able to attend) | March 19, 2024 | Allen, Aaron, Taeyoung | Xikers |
| 619 | March 26, 2024 | Aaron, Jay Chang | The New Six |
| 620 (Note: Pre-recorded on March 26) | April 2, 2024 | Aaron | LUN8 |
| 621 | April 9, 2024 | Allen, Aaron, Taeyoung | Illit |
| 623 (Note: Woobin wasn't able to attend) | April 16, 2024 | Allen, Aaron, Taeyoung | Cravity |
| 623 | April 23, 2024 | Allen, Aaron, Taeyoung | Nowadays |
| 624 | April 30, 2024 | Aaron, Hunter | Epex |
| 625 | May 7, 2024 | Allen, Aaron, Taeyoung | Onewe |
| 626 | May 14, 2024 | Allen, Aaron, Taeyoung | 82Major |
| 627 | May 21, 2024 | Allen, Aaron, Taeyoung | LEO |
| 628 | May 28, 2024 | Allen, Aaron, Taeyoung | MCND |
| 629 | June 4, 2024 | Aaron | Artms |
| 630 | June 11, 2024 | Allen, Aaron, Taeyoung | E'Last |
| 631 | June 18, 2024 | Allen, Aaron, Taeyoung | Everglow |
| 632 (Note: Jay Chang wasn't able to attend) | June 25, 2024 | Allen, Aaron, Taeyoung | One Pact |
| 633 | July 2, 2024 | Allen, Aaron, Taeyoung | Kim Jae-joong |
| 634 | July 9, 2024 | Allen, Aaron, Taeyoung | B.D.U |
| 635 | July 16, 2024 | Allen, Aaron, Taeyoung | All(H)Ours |
| 636 | July 23, 2024 | Allen, Aaron, Taeyoung | Weeekly |
| 637 | July 30, 2024 | Aaron | DKB |
| 638 | August 6, 2024 | Allen, Aaron, Taeyoung | Waker |
| 639 | August 13, 2024 | Allen, Aaron, Taeyoung | N.SSign |
| 640 | August 20, 2024 | Allen, Aaron, Taeyoung | Drippin |
| 641 | August 27, 2024 | Allen, Aaron, Taeyoung | Catch The Young |
| 642 | September 3, 2024 | Allen, Aaron, Taeyoung | ARrC |
| 643 | September 10, 2024 | Aaron | Xikers |
| 644 (Note: Chuseok Special) | September 17, 2024 | Allen, Aaron, Taeyoung | Baekho, Steven, and Minjae |
| 645 | September 24, 2024 | Aaron, Yoon Yechan | Katseye |
| 646 (Note: Taeyoung wasn't able to attend) | October 1, 2024 | Allen, Aaron | Vanner |
| 647 | October 8, 2024 | Aaron | Xodiac |
| 648 | October 15, 2024 | Aaron | WHIB |
| 649 | October 22, 2024 | Aaron, Jayn Lee | Billlie |
| 650 | October 29, 2024 | Allen, Aaron, Taeyoung | Say My Name |
| 651 | November 5, 2024 | Allen, Aaron, Taeyoung | Pow |
| 652 | November 12, 2024 | Allen, Aaron, Taeyoung | 82Major |
| 653 (Note: Jay Chang wasn't able to attend) | November 19, 2024 | Allen, Aaron, Taeyoung | One Pact |
| 654 | November 26, 2024 | Allen, Aaron, Taeyoung | The CrewOne |
| 655 | December 3, 2024 | Allen, Aaron, Taeyoung | Jay Chang |
| 656 | December 10, 2024 | Allen, Aaron, Taeyoung | A.C.E |
| 657 | December 17, 2024 | Allen, Aaron, Taeyoung | Cravity |
| 658 | December 24, 2024 | Allen, Aaron, Taeyoung | Younite |
| 659 (Note: MC Special) | December 31, 2024 | Allen, Aaron, Taeyoung | - |

=== 2025 ===
List of Episodes (2025)

| Episode | Air Date | MC | Guest |
|---|---|---|---|
| 660 | January 7, 2025 | Allen, Aaron, Taeyoung | Young Posse |
| 661 | January 14, 2025 | Aaron, Jayn Lee | N.SSign |
| 662 | January 21, 2025 | Allen, Aaron, Taeyoung | WEi |
| 663 | January 28, 2025 | Allen, Aaron, Taeyoung | CIX |
| 664 | February 5, 2025 | Allen, Aaron, Taeyoung | KickFlip |
| 665 | February 11, 2025 | Aaron, Jayn Lee | Rescene |
| 666 | February 18, 2025 | Allen, Aaron, Taeyoung | All(H)Ours |
| 667 | February 25, 2025 | Allen, Aaron, Taeyoung | ARrC |
| 668 | March 4, 2025 | Allen, Aaron, Taeyoung | 8Turn |
| 669 | March 11, 2025 | Allen, Aaron, Taeyoung | Nouera |
| 670 | March 18, 2025 | Allen, Aaron, Taeyoung | One Pact |
| 671 | March 25, 2025 | Allen, Aaron, Taeyoung | TNX |
