= After School Club =

2013 South Korean TV talk show

- Genre: Entertainment, Music
- Written by: Yang Seon-jin; Lee A-ra
- Directed by: Kim Ji-hyun
- Presented by: Allen; Aaron Kwak; Taeyoung
- Country of origin: South Korea
- Original language: English
- No. of episodes: 607 (list of episodes)

Production
- Executive producer: Summer Jung
- Producer: Lee Hyun-ah
- Production location: Seoul
- Camera setup: Multiple
- Running time: 50–54 minutes

Original release
- Network: Arirang TV (Korea/Worldwide); Myx TV (US/Europe/Middle East); Hallypop (Philippines)
- Release: April 17, 2013 – present

Related
- Pops in Seoul; Superstar K Show! Music Core; Wave K

After School Club, often shortened to ASC, is a South Korean interactive music talk show that primarily airs on Arirang TV. Premiering on April 17, 2013, the show is currently co-hosted by Allen and Taeyoung of Cravity and Aaron Kwak. After School Club's live broadcast spotlights Korean musicians, primarily K-pop idols and groups, and is spoken in English as the program is directed towards an international audience.

After School Club is produced by Lee Hyun-ah and executive produced by Summer Jung. Aside from its television broadcasts, After School Club is also live streamed online and utilizes social media technologies such as Twitter and Google Hangouts to directly interact with international fans. Through this, the show features a live audience consisting of the guests' fans that are shown through video chats.

== Premise and format ==
ASC features various musical guests of South Korea and the series is directed at an international audience, thus, the principal language is English with Korean subtitles and translations produced on air. Fans can join in on the live broadcasts through video chats in Google Hangouts, send in tweets to the show's official Twitter account, and are also able to share comments, ask questions, and request music videos on the show's official Facebook account. The show is also live streamed on Viki, Soompi, DramaFever, YouTube, and V Live.

Two activities that take place every episode are the Roll Calls and Hangouts. During the "Roll Call" portion Twitter users tweet their name, location, the time and generally a short message to the weekly guest. Those that participate may be singled out during the beginning of the episode and given a shout out by the guest. "Hangouts" are typically done twice an episode where some fans are selected for a real-time Google Hangout on the show which usually involves something (such as a song or dance) prepared by the fan to show to the guest(s) and a request. Other activities include prepared performances for fans by the guests, such as impressions, dances, and short parodies.

On March 5, 2014 (episode 48) the show expanded to include a second episode every week known as the After School Club After Show which features other guest appearances and behind-the-scenes footage from the previous episodes. The production team announced on Twitter that the After Show segment would be retired; the last After Show was on February 25, 2015 (episode 148).

The show joined V Live on August 25, 2015, Instagram on June 1, 2016, and Snapchat on January 2, 2017.

A new logo and a new studio set was introduced beginning from Episode 361 on March 26, 2019.

== Hosting history ==
The original hosts of After School Club were Eric Nam and Jang Han-byul. 15&'s Park Jimin (now going by the name Jamie) was originally a guest for episode 67 as part of 15& and was an occasional co-host for the main show/MC of After Show from episode 87 onwards. Jamie was promoted to co-host of the main show after the cancellation of After Show. U-KISS's Kevin Woo was originally a guest on episode 3 and was a co-host for the main show from episode 43 onwards.

On April 11, 2016, it was announced that Eric would be leaving the show, the April 12 episode being his last appearance. On June 21, 2016, it was announced that Jae of Day6, who was a guest on episode 214, would be a co-host starting with episode 218.

On April 3, 2018, it was announced that Kevin would be graduating as MC of the show. His last episode as an MC was on April 10 and ASC held graduation ceremony for him on April 17.

On July 5, 2018, it was announced that Jae would be graduating as MC of the show after two years, with his last episode airing on July 17. On July 18, it was announced that Seungmin of Stray Kids and Han Hee-jun would co-host with Jamie. Seungmin left the show on December 12 due to scheduling conflicts. Seungmin's last episode aired on December 25.

On March 20, 2019, it was announced on Twitter that Kim Woo-sung of The Rose will be the third MC beginning with episode 361 on March 26, 2019. Woosung left the show on December 31 due to his future promotions and busy performance schedules. He was replaced by Park Yu-ri of JxR, whose first episode aired on March 3, 2020. Yuri departed after the August 25, 2020, episode. In October 2020, Jaeyun of TO1 was announced as the new co-host of After School Club, and he begin emceeing starting from the October 13 episode.

On September 1, 2021, it was announced that Kim Byeongkwan of A.C.E would be replacing Heejun as the new co-host of the program, following Heejun's departure following the August 31, 2021, episode. Byeongkwan graduated from the show on March 22, 2022, due to his impending enlistment in the military. He was replaced by Cravity's Allen.

Jaeyun graduated from the show on June 21. He was replaced by former NU'EST member Aaron Kwak beginning from the July 26 episode. After hosting for over seven years, Jamie departed the show following the August 16 episode to focus on her music career and to work on her new album. She was replaced by Cravity's Taeyoung beginning from the September 6 episode.

=== Current cast ===
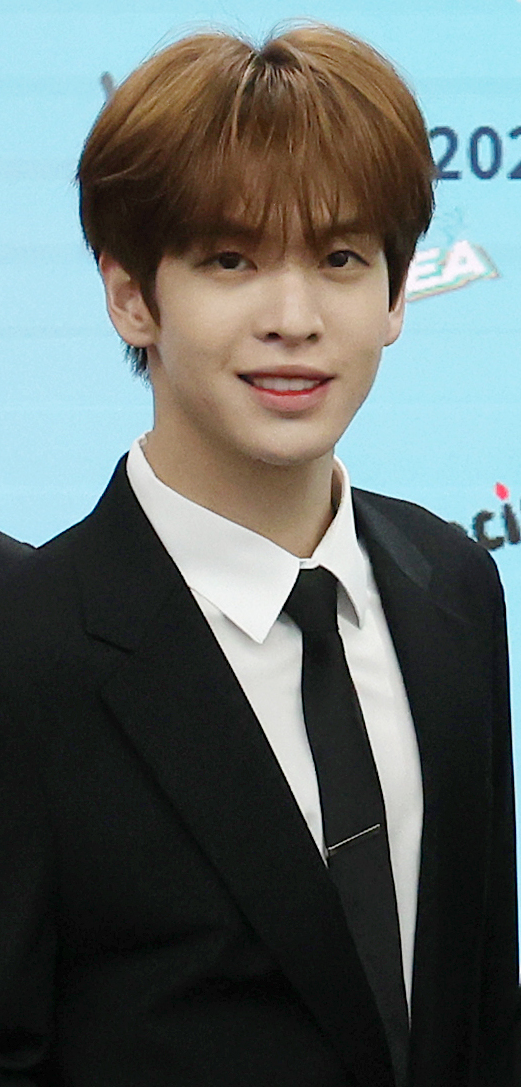
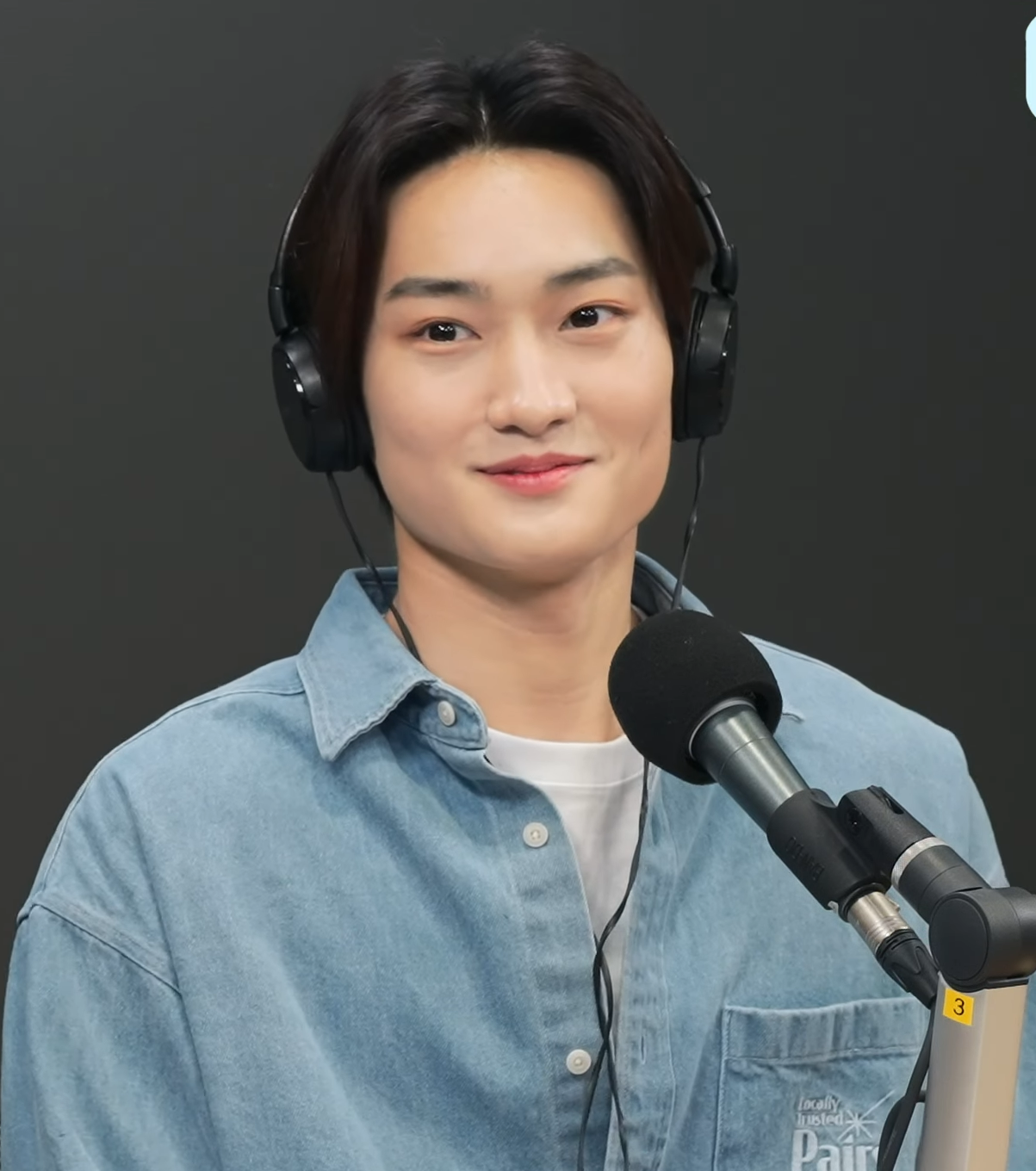
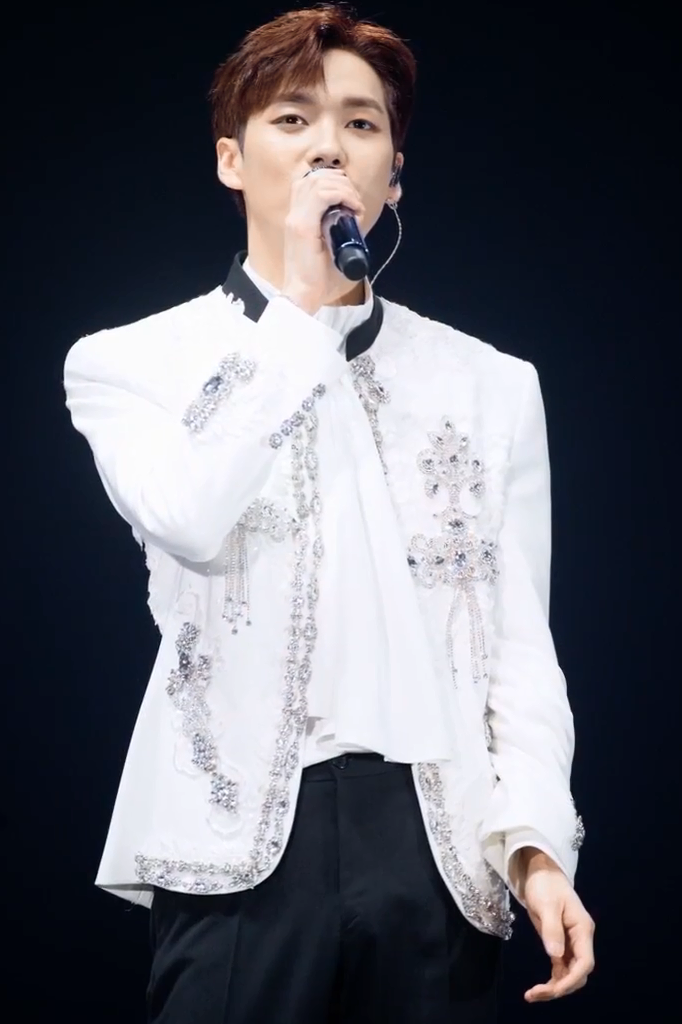
Allen (left) and Taeyoung of Cravity (center) and Aaron Kwak (right) are the current co-hosts of After School Club, both having joined the show in 2022.

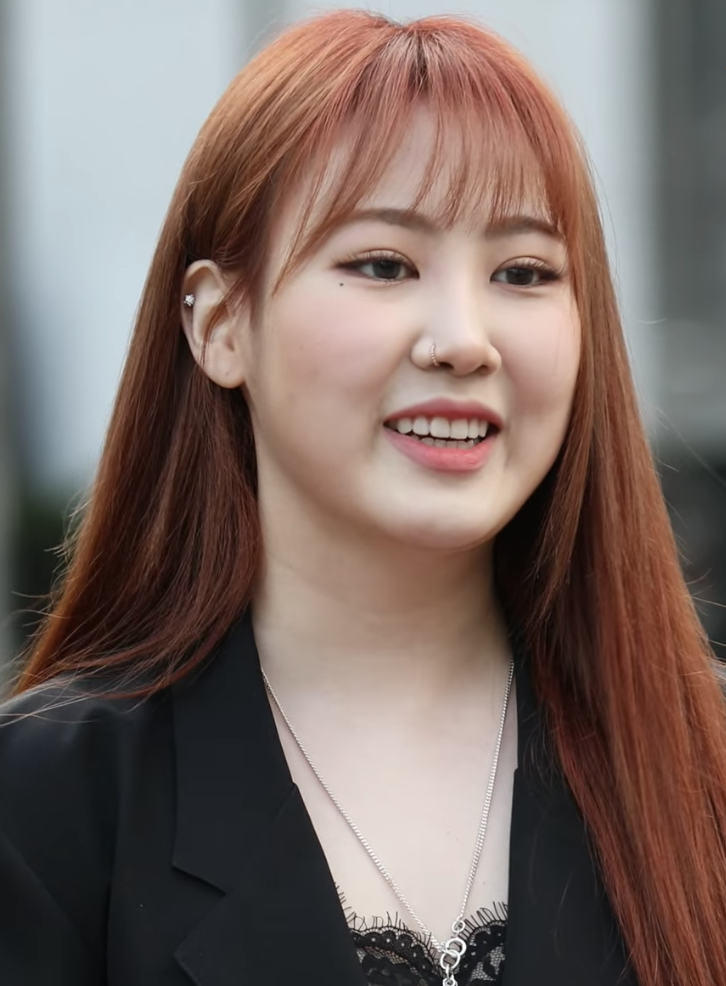
Jamie (pictured) joined After School Club in July 2014 and served as an official host from March 2015 until August 2022. She hosted the program for seven years, the longest time period out of any host.

Name	Duration	Notes
Allen	Episode 516 – present (co-host)	Co-host with Aaron and Taeyoung. Replaced Byeongkwan as a host.
Aaron	Episode 533 – present (co-host)	Co-host with Allen and Taeyoung. Replaced Jaeyun as a host.
Taeyoung	Episode 538 – present (co-host)	Co-host with Allen and Aaron. Replaced Jamie as a host.

=== Former cast ===
Name	Duration	Notes
Jang Han-byul	Episode 1 – 39	Co-host with Eric. One of the first hosts of the program.
Eric Nam	Episode 150, 300 (guest); Episode 1 – 207	Co-host with Hanbyul, Kevin, and Jimin. One of the first hosts of the program.
Kevin Woo	Episode 3, 31, 312 (guest); Episode 43 – 311 (co-host)	Replaced Hanbyul from episode 43 onwards. Co-hosted with Jimin and Jae after Eric Nam's departure. Originally a guest on episode 3 with uBeat and episode 31 with U-KISS.
Jae	Episode 214, 325 (guest); Episode 218 – 324 (co-host)	Co-host with Jimin and Kevin. Replaced main host Eric Nam. Originally a guest on episode 214.
Seungmin	Episode 310, 318, 329, 340 (guest); Episode 326 – 348 (co-host)	Co-host with Jimin and Heejun. Replaced Jae and Kevin as a host. Originally a guest on episodes 310 and 318 with Stray Kids.
Woosung	Episode 361 – 401 (co-host)	Co-host with Jimin and Heejun. Replaced Seungmin as a host.
Yuri Park	Episode 401 – 435 (co-host)	Co-host with Jimin and Heejun. Replaced Woosung as a host.
Han Heejun	Episode 326 – 486 (co-host)	Co-host with Jamie, Seungmin, Woosung, Yuri, and Jaeyun. Replaced Jae as a host.
Byeongkwan	Episode 473, 482 (guest host); Episode 487 – 515 (co-host)	Co-host with Jamie and Jaeyun. Replaced Heejun as a host.
Jaeyun	Episode 442 – 528 (co-host)	Co-host with Jamie, Byeongkwan, and Allen. Replaced Yuri as a host.
Jamie	Episode 67 (guest); Episode 87 – 536 (co-host)	Co-host with Eric, Kevin, Jae, Seungmin, Heejun, Woosung, Yuri, Jaeyun, Byeongkwan, Allen, and Aaron. Used to exclusively host on the After Show and guest host on the main show before After Show's cancellation.

=== Cast timeline ===
Generation	Name	Episode(s)
1	Jang Hanbyul, Eric Nam	1–39
2	Eric Nam, Kevin	43–86
3	Eric Nam, Kevin, Jamie	87–207
4	Kevin, Jamie	208–217
5	Kevin, Jamie, Jae	218–311
6	Jamie, Jae	312–324
7	Jamie, Seungmin, Heejun	326–348
8	Jamie, Heejun	349–360, 402–409, 436–441
9	Jamie, Heejun, Woosung	361–401
10	Jamie, Heejun, Yuri	410–435, 427
11	Jamie, Heejun, Jaeyun	442–486
12	Jamie, Jaeyun, Byeongkwan	487–515
13	Jamie, Jaeyun, Allen	517–528
14	Jamie, Allen	529–535
15	Allen, Aaron, Taeyoung	538–present

=== Guest cast ===
- 6 episodes
  - Young K
- 5 episodes
  - Ashley
- 4 episodes
  - Benji
  - Brad
  - Min
- 3 episodes
  - BM
  - Kevin Woo
  - Yechan
- 2 episodes
  - Amber
  - Moon
  - NS Yoon-G
  - Sanchez
  - Tia
  - Bang Chan
  - Peniel
  - Taeyoung
- 1 episode
  - BamBam
  - Kevin
  - Rome
  - Sam
  - Felix
  - Junghoon
  - Bernard
  - Jay Chang
  - Hunter
