= You Make Me (Day6 song) =

Single by Day6

from the EP The Book of Us: Negentropy
- Language: Korean
- Released: April 19, 2021
- Length: 3:28
- Label: JYP
- Composers: Young K; Wonpil; Hong Ji-sang
- Lyricist: Young K

Day6 singles chronology
"Zombie" (2020)	"You Make Me" (2021)	"Welcome to the Show" (2024)

Music video
- "You Make Me" on YouTube

"You Make Me" is a song recorded by South Korean boy band Day6 for their seventh extended play The Book of Us: Negentropy. It was released as the EP's lead single by JYP Entertainment on April 19, 2021. The song marked the last single of Day6 as a five-member band following the departure of member Jae in December 2021.

== Background and release ==
JYP Entertainment announced in February 26, 2021 that Day6 would make a full group comeback in April 2021. On March 8, 2021, Sungjin announced during a V Live broadcast that he would be enlisting for his mandatory military service on the same day as the release day, having already recorded for the upcoming album.

== Composition ==
"You Make Me" Is written by Young K and composed by Young K, Wonpil and Hong Ji-sang. The song is composed in the key F-sharp Major and has 101 beats per minute and a running time of 3 minutes and 39 seconds. The song contains the message that 'If you have love, you can endure anything and move forward'.

== Promotion ==
Due to Sungjin's military enlistment, the group decided that they would not hold any promotions for "You Make Me" as they only want to promote as a full group.

== Charts ==
Weekly chart performance for "You Make Me"
Chart (2021)	Peak position
South Korea (Circle)	73
South Korea (K-pop Hot 100)	86

== Release history ==
Release history
Region	Date	Format	Label
Various	April 19, 2021	Digital download; streaming	JYP
