= Itaewon Global Village Festival =

Annual cultural festival in Seoul, South Korea

Itaewon Global Village Festival (Korean: 이태원 지구촌 축제; RR: Itaewon Jiguchon Chugje) is an annual cultural festival held in Itaewon, Seoul, South Korea, since 2002. It is hosted by the Itaewon Tourism Zone Association and takes place in the fall, typically in October. The main objective of the festival is to heat up tourism in the Itaewon area, as well as attract foreign visitors.

It aims to bring together Korean traditional culture and foreign culture in Itaewon through parades, food exhibitions, concerts, and more. The parades have up to 800 participants, and concerts often include K-pop artists of the Hallyu Wave.

== Editions ==
- 2008: October 16–19
- 2009: October 16–18
- 2010: October 15–17
- 2011: October 29–30
- 2012: October 12–14
- 2013: October 12–13
- 2014: October 11–12
- 2019: October 12–13

== Main attractions ==
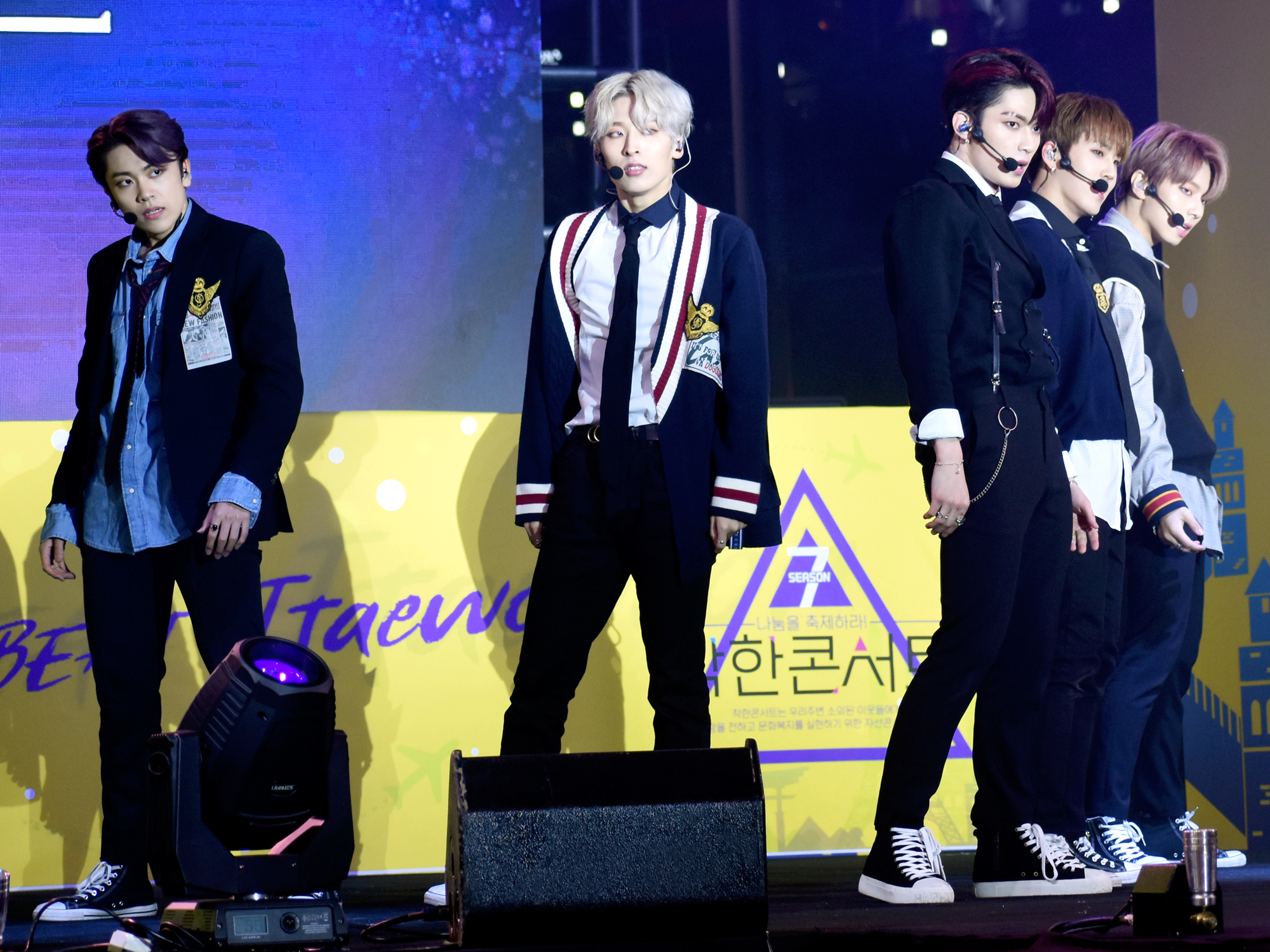
Seven O'Clock at the Itaewon Global Village Festival on October 13, 2018

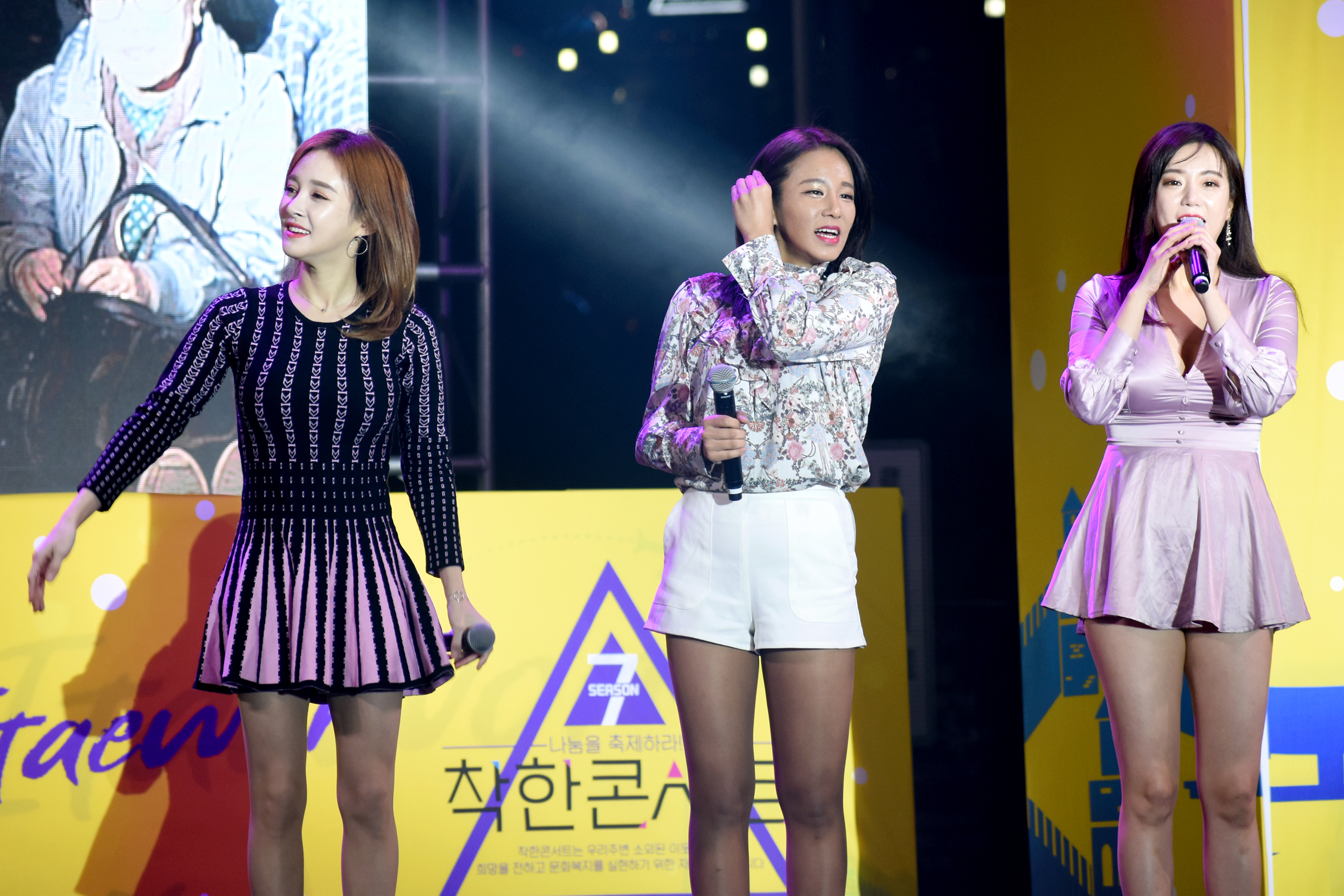
The girl group Six Bomb at the Itaewon Global Village Festival on October 13, 2018

- Global Village Parade

An opening ceremony with 300 flag bearers and street marchers.

- Global Traditional Outfit Fashion Show

A fashion show with Korean traditional outfits, such as hanbok, and also traditional outfits from other countries.

- Global Food Exhibition & Customs Show

Tasting and sale of various food from around the world.

- C&M Kind Concert

C&M Kind Concert is a special concert, often featuring K-Pop artists. In 2014, the headliner was girl group Dal Shabet.

- Global Village DJ Party

A show of Itaewon's club culture through DJ concerts.

- Global Village Culture Performance

Interactive performances of world music, art, and dance.

== Things to enjoy ==
The festival will be held with vehicles in Itaewon-ro and Bokwang-ro under complete control. It will continue its major programs such as the opening ceremony, the Delive Good Concert, the World Traditional Culture Contest (World Culture Grand Prize), the global parade, cooking Itaewon, DJ party, and the closing ceremony (K Beauty Contest), etc.

=== Global Parade ===
The global parade is the 'face' of the Itaewon festival. A large parade of 1,000 members from 32 teams, including UNESCO International Martial Arts Demonstration Team and World Folk Costume Team, will march 1.4 km from Hangangjin Station to Noksapyeong Station, and the Chilseok-dong Gossam (Important Intangible Cultural Heritage No. 33) will mark the finale.

=== World food ===
You can taste the world's food yourself. You can taste traditional food from various countries, including European food and Asian food.

== See also ==
- List of festivals in South Korea
- List of festivals in Asia
