= Slchld =

Korean-Canadian singer-songwriter

- Born: Jang Doo-hyuk; 1996 (age 29–30); Seoul, South Korea
- Origin: Vancouver, Canada
- Genres: R&B; Lo-fi; Pop
- Occupation: Singer-songwriter
- Years active: 2018–present

Doo Hyuk Jang (Korean: 장두혁; born 1996), known mononymously as Slchld (stylized in all lowercase), is a South Korean-Canadian singer-songwriter. He is known for his work in the R&B and lo-fi genres. Born in Seoul, he grew up in Vancouver, Canada, before returning to South Korea to pursue a music career.

== Early life ==
Doo Hyuk Jang was born in Seoul, South Korea. He moved to Canada with his family after completing the first grade and was raised in Vancouver. During his youth in Canada, he was exposed to Korean music as well as North American and European R&B styles. He began recording music as a hobby before releasing his work professionally. Jang is currently based in Seoul.

== Career ==
Jang began his musical career in 2018 under the stage name Slchld. He released his debut singles, "Say What’s On Your Mind" and "I’d Be Sad If You Were Gone", that same year. In 2019, he released his debut EP, My Insecurities, Not Yours, followed by the EPs Innocence and Bittersweet.

In 2020, Slchld collaborated with producer Aso on the single "believe in myself". His fourth EP, Blood Lotus Diary, was released in early 2022 and included the tracks "Lone Summer" and "Love Me At My Worst". In January 2023, he collaborated with the Thai indie pop duo HYBS on the single "Good Care," which was released as part of Asiatic Records' compilation album asiatic.wav Vol. 3.

Jang released the single "CARE" in June 2024. The track serves as a lead single for his EP APOLOGY, which features a collaboration with Korean-American singer eaJ.

=== Touring ===
Jang has performed internationally, with a focus on markets in Southeast Asia. He embarked on his first tour of the region in 2022, performing in Bangkok and Singapore. In 2024, he co-headlined the HZWhale Music Festival in Bangkok alongside the Singaporean R&B trio brb.

== Discography ==
=== Extended plays ===
List of extended plays, with selected details
| Title | Details |
|---|---|
| My Insecurities, Not Yours | Released: 2019; Format: Streaming, digital download |
| Innocence | Released: 2019; Format: Streaming, digital download |
| Bittersweet | Released: 2019; Format: Streaming, digital download |
| Blood Lotus Diary | Released: 2022; Format: Streaming, digital download |

=== Singles ===
List of singles, showing year released and album name
| Title | Year | Album |
|---|---|---|
| "Say What’s On Your Mind" | 2018 | Non-album singles |
| "I’d Be Sad If You Were Gone" | 2018 | Non-album singles |
| "believe in myself" (with Aso) | 2020 | Non-album singles |
| "Good Care" (with HYBS) | 2023 | asiatic.wav Vol. 3 |
| "CARE" | 2024 | APOLOGY |
