= A Shoulder to Cry On (TV series) =

2023 South Korean television series

- Promotional poster
- Hangul: 소년을 위로해줘
- Lit.: Comfort the Boy
- RR: Sonyeoneul wirohaejwo
- MR: Sonyŏnŭl wirohaejwŏ
- Genre: Coming-of-age; Teen romance
- Based on: A Shoulder to Cry On by Dongmul
- Screenplay by: Kang Jae-hyun; Song Soo-rim; Noh Ji
- Directed by: Song Soo-rim; Kim Jin-chul
- Starring: Kim Jae-han; Shin Ye-chan
- Opening theme: "Come Together" by Omega X
- Country of origin: South Korea
- Original language: Korean
- No. of episodes: 7

Production
- Producers: Yoon Hye-young; Song Joo-sung; Ha Dong-geun; Im Chang-min; Wi Sang-ah
- Cinematography: Kang Hyuk-joon; Choi Eun-suk
- Running time: 30 minutes
- Production companies: IPQ Entertainment; MODT Studio

Original release
- Network: WATCHA; Wavve; TVING; Viki; GagaOOLala
- Release: March 15 – March 30, 2023

A Shoulder to Cry On (Korean: 소년을 위로해줘; RR: Sonyeoneul wirohaejwo; lit. 'Comfort the Boy') is a 2023 South Korean streaming television series starring Kim Jae-han and Shin Ye-chan. Based on the 2018–19 BL webtoon of the same name written by Dongmul (동물) and serialized in Lezhin Comics, the series premiered on March 15, 2023 in South Korea on WATCHA, Wavve, TVING, and on various platforms such as IPTV, and globally through Viki and GagaOOLala.

== Synopsis ==
Lee Da-yeol (Kim Jae-han) spends his time in school as an outsider, excels as an archer and a member of the archery club, while Jo Tae-hyun (Shin Ye-chan) is one of the school's most popular students, class president and with a dark secret past. One day, Da-yeol gets wrapped up in rumors after meeting Tae-hyun in the nurse's office, which puts his archery scholarship in jeopardy. Desperate to correct the misunderstanding, Da-yeol does everything he can to quell the rumors but to no avail. On the other hand, Tae-hyun is completely unremorseful and shamelessly follows and begins hanging around with Da-yeol. Without realizing it, the two became curious about each other and slowly started walking the thin line between hate and love.

== Episodes ==
Season	Episodes	Originally released
1	7	March 15 – March 30, 2023
2	TBA	2026

== Cast ==
=== Main ===
- Kim Jae-han as Lee Da-yeol
- Shin Ye-chan as Jo Tae-hyun

=== Supporting ===
- Shin Si-ye as So-yeong
- Jeong Ho-gyun as Ye-beom
- Oh Joo-seok as Won-kyung
- Kim Dong-won as Min-jung

== Original soundtrack ==
The soundtrack for the series was released by Danal Entertainment on March 17, 2023.

A Shoulder to Cry On (Original Television Soundtrack)
No.	Title	Lyrics	Music	Artist	Length
1.	"Come Together"	Han Hye-ji (FAB); PiRi BOi (FAB); Ji Ye-jun; pdly (MonoTree)	Han; BOi; Ji; Jaehan	Omega X	3:42
2.	"You, again"	Han Hye-ji (FAB); PiRi BOi (FAB)	Han; BOi; Jaehan; IKEK; KYRIELLE	Omega X	4:38
3.	"Comfort"	Kim Jun-tae (WEHOT); Lee Jae-joon (WEHOT); JAYBLE (WEHOT); Hangyeom (WEHOT)	Kim; Lee; JAYBLE; Hangyeom	Omega X	3:34
4.	"Come Together" (English ver.)	Han Hye-ji (FAB); PiRi BOi (FAB); Ji Ye-jun; pdly (MonoTree)	Han; BOi; Ji; Jaehan	Omega X	3:39
5.	"You, again" (English ver.)	Han Hye-ji (FAB); PiRi BOi (FAB)	Han; BOi; Jaehan; IKEK; KYRIELLE	Omega X	4:39
6.	"Comfort" (English ver.)	Kim Jun-tae (WEHOT); Lee Jae-joon (WEHOT); JAYBLE (WEHOT); Hangyeom (WEHOT)	Kim; Lee; JAYBLE; Hangyeom	Omega X	3:34
Total length:					23:48

== Episodes ==
No.	Title	Original release date
1	"Hamster and Sociopath"; Transliteration: "Haemseuteowa sosi-opaeseu" (Korean: 햄스터와 소시오패스)	March 15, 2023
2	"Like a friend, not a friend" Transliteration: "Chingu anin chingu gat-eun chingu" (Korean: 친구 아닌 친구 같은 친구)	March 16, 2023
3	"The gym equipment storage room" Transliteration: "Cheyukchanggo" (Korean: 체육창고)	March 22, 2023
4	"An arrow with no regrets" Transliteration: "Huhoi eobneun hwasal" (Korean: 후회 없는 화살)	March 23, 2023
5	"Not passion, but acceptance" Transliteration: "Yeoljeong malgo injeong" (Korean: 열정 말고 인정)	March 29, 2023
6	"A shoulder to cry on" Transliteration: "Sonyeoneul wirohaejweo" (Korean: 소년을 위로해줘)	March 30, 2023
7	"Epilogue"; Transliteration: "Sonyeoneul wirohaejweo! Geu ihu" (Korean: 소년을 위로해줘! 그 이후)	March 30, 2023
