= Omega X =

South Korean boy band

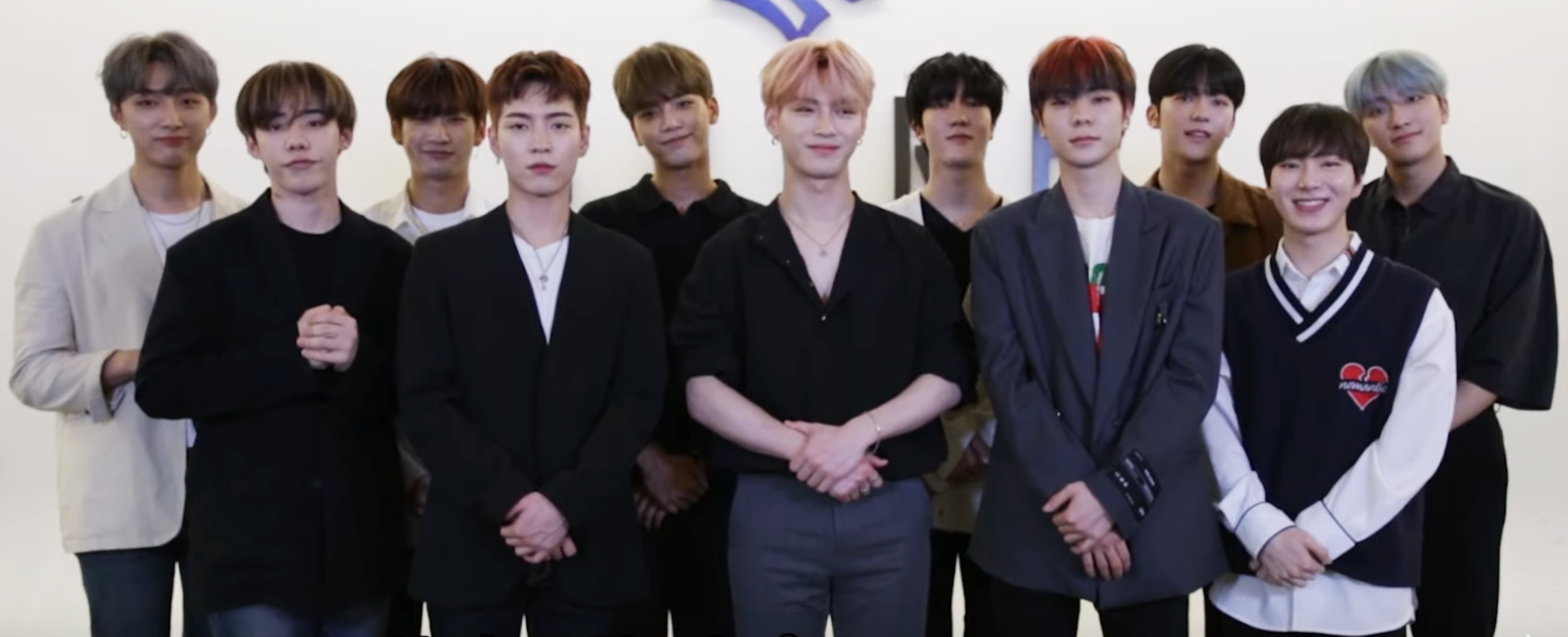
- Omega X in June 2021. From left to right: Jaehan, Xen, Taedong, Hwichan, Hyuk, Hangyeom, Junghoon, Jehyun, Yechan, Kevin, Sebin.

Background information
- Origin: Seoul, South Korea
- Genre: K-pop
- Years active: 2021–present
- Labels: Spire; IPQ
- Spinoffs: OX:N
- Members: Jaehan; Hwichan; Sebin; Hangyeom; Taedong; Xen; Jehyun; Kevin; Hyuk; Yechan
- Past members: Junghoon

Korean name
- Hangul: 오메가엑스
Transcriptions
- Revised Romanization: Omega ekseu

Japanese name
- Hiragana: オメガエックス
Transcriptions
- Kunrei-shiki: Omega ekkusu

Omega X (Korean: 오메가엑스, stylized in all caps) is a South Korean boy band formed in 2021. The group currently consists of 10 members: Jaehan, Hwichan, Sebin, Hangyeom, Taedong, Xen, Jehyun, Kevin, Hyuk and Yechan. Originally an 11-member group, Junghoon left the group on June 1, 2026.

== History ==
=== Pre-debut ===
All of Omega X's members had appeared in survival shows or debuted in previous K-pop groups before debuting in Omega X. Hangyeom is a former member of Seven O'Clock, who also participated in Mix Nine, finishing in sixth place. Jaehan was a contestant on Produce 101 Season 2 and a former member of Spectrum. Hwichan was the drummer of Kokoma Band (literally, "Little Kids' Band"), a trainee band managed by FNC Entertainment. He also participated in Mix Nine and is a former member of Limitless. Sebin is a member of Snuper and participated in The Unit: Idol Rebooting Project. Taedong participated in Boys24 and Produce 101 Season 2, and is a former member of Gidongdae. Xen and Jehyun are former members of 1Team. Kevin, Junghoon and Hyuk are former members of ENOi. Yechan participated in Under Nineteen and is a former member of 1the9.

=== 2021: Debut with Vamos and What's Goin' On ===
On June 30, Omega X debuted with the release of their first EP, Vamos, and its lead single of the same name.

On September 6, Omega X released their first single album, What's Goin' On, and its lead single of the same name.

=== 2022: Love Me Like, Story Written in Music and Japanese debut ===
On January 5, Omega X released their second EP, Love Me Like, and its lead single of the same name.

On June 15, Omega X released their first studio album, Story Written in Music, and its track "Play Dumb".

On August 24, Omega X made their Japanese debut under Tokuma Shoten with the mini album Stand Up! and the title track was pre-released on July 1.

=== 2023–present: Return after lawsuit win, IYKYK, enlistments, OX:N and Junghoon's departure ===
On February 11, 2023, a month after winning the lawsuit against their former label, Omega X attended and performed at the second day of the awards ceremony of the 30th Hanteo Music Awards. The group also revealed their new song, "Dream", which was composed by Hangyeom and written by the members, during the event. The song was released on April 24, 2023, through various online music streaming sites.

On May 7, 2023, it was announced that the group had parted ways with Spire Entertainment after terminating their contract. In July 2023, Omega X signed an exclusive management contract with IPQ.

On October 18, the group announced their return and released their third mini album IYKYK (If You Know, You Know) on November 7.

On June 4, 2024, IPQ announced that Hwichan will be enlisting in the military on July 4th and Sebin on July 16th.

On May 30, 2025, Omega X has announced that the group's first subunit, OX:N which consists of Jaehan, Xen, Jehyun and Yechan. They officially debuted on June 20th, with their first ep, N.

On June 1, 2026, IPQ announced that Junghoon has left the group due to health issues.

== Legal issues and controversies ==
=== Abuse allegations and lawsuit against Spire and YouTuber ===
On October 24, 2022, a video was leaked showing the CEO of Spire Entertainment physically and verbally abusing members of the group as one of them faints. On the same day, Spire Entertainment released a statement claiming that both Omega X and the label had "resolved all their misunderstandings" while the CEO denied any abuse having taken place. The following day, SBS shared a new video taken by a fan showing the CEO verbally abusing the members outside a concert venue, with one member undergoing a panic attack.

On November 5, the group created a new Instagram separate from the label, where they announced their intentions to continue as a group and communicate with their fans. On November 7, Spire released another apology in response to the Instagram post by Omega X, as well as announcing the resignation of the company's CEO to prevent future incidents. On November 11, SBS revealed more allegations against the company such as them forcing the group to perform despite testing positive for COVID-19, and a new video of the initial yelling incident, revealing that the CEO yelled at the members for not properly thanking her or the company during their live concert. The company only issued a brief statement reaffirming the earlier apology and resignation of the CEO.

On November 14, it was announced that a press conference would be held with the members on November 16 for a special announcement. Ahead of the press conference the group filed a trademark for their name as well as the fanbase, For X. It was also revealed by their legal representative that the group suffered assault, intimidation, sexual harassment, gaslighting, and other forms of abuse. During the press conference, it was announced that Omega X would be filing a lawsuit to terminate their contracts against Spire Entertainment.

On January 11, 2023, Omega X announced that they had won their lawsuit and their contracts with Spire were suspended.

On August 21, IPQ released a statement denying allegations made on Omega X by YouTuber In Ji-woong and announced legal response against both In and Spire Entertainment for defamation, as well as legal action against Spire for breach of contract, mental and physical abuse against Omega X members. Lawyer Noh Jong-eon, the group's legal representative, stated on August 28 that they filed a lawsuit against Spire for sexual harassment and that they planned to hold a press conference. Meanwhile, member Yechan's father also filed a complaint against the YouTuber for spreading false information.

== Members ==
Adapted from their Naver profile and official website.

- Jaehan (재한) - leader
- Hwichan (휘찬)
- Sebin (세빈)
- Hangyeom (한겸)
- Taedong (태동)
- Xen (젠)
- Jehyun (제현)
- Kevin (케빈)
- Hyuk (혁)
- Yechan (예찬)

Former

- Junghoon (정훈)

== Discography ==
=== Studio albums ===
Title	Details	Peak chart positions	Sales
Title	Details	KOR	Sales
Story Written in Music	Released: June 15, 2022; Label: Spire Entertainment; Formats: CD, digital download, streaming; Track listing: 1. "Venus" (연결); 2. "Play Dumb"; 3. "Binary Star"; 4. "All About U"; 5. "Don't (Jaehyun, Xen, Jehyun, Kevin, Yechan)"; 6. "Take 'Em All"; 7. "Bounce With Me"; 8. "Dance With U (Sebin, Xen, Jehyun, Junghoon, Kevin, Hyuk)"; 9. "Airplane (전세기) (Hangyeom, Jaehan, Yechan)"; 10. "Dry Flower"; 11. "Control (Hwichan, Taedong, Xen, Jehyun)"; 12. "Love (가직해줘) (Jaehan, Hwichan, Hangyeom, Yechan)"; 13. "For Baby" (CD only)	4	KOR: 59,207

=== Extended plays ===
==== Korean extended plays ====
Title	Details	sco7 pe="col" | Peak chart positions	Sales
Title	Details	KOR	Sales
Vamos	Released: June 30, 2021; Label: Spire Entertainment; Formats: CD, digital download, streaming; Track listing: 1. "Ox Win Ha!"; 2. "Vamos"; 3. "Icetag" (얼음땡); 4. "Omega X"; 5. "Younger"	11	KOR: 18,395
Love Me Like	Released: January 5, 2022; Label: Spire Entertainment; Formats: CD, digital download, streaming; Track listing: 1. "Love Me Like"; 2. "Action"; 3. "12.24"; 4. "Liar"; 5. "Please" (전화해요)	2	KOR: 89,619
IYKYK	Released: November 7, 2023; Label: IPQ Inc.; Formats: CD, digital download, streaming; Track listing: 1. "Louder"; 2. "Junk Food"; 3. "Touch"; 4. "Hey!"; 5. "Island"	9	KOR: 76,359
Uncapped	Released: June 19, 2026; Label: IPQ Inc.; Formats: CD, digital download, streaming; Track listing: 1. Day Zero; 2. Uncapped; 3. Close to Me (Jaehan, Xen, Yechan); 4. Cork (Hwichan, Sebin, Jehyun, Kevin); 5. Life Detox	53	KOR: +1,800

==== Japanese extended plays ====
Title	Details	Peak chart positions	Sales
Title	Details	JPN	Sales
Stand Up!	Released: August 24, 2022; Label: Tokuma Japan Communications; Formats: CD, DVD, digital download, streaming; Track listing: 1. "Stand Up!"; 2. "Luv 'Em"; 3. "I'm Sorry"; 4. "Drive"; 5. "#BRB"; 6. "Omega X" (JP ver.) (Digital/Regular version only); 7. "Stand Up! MV Making Video" (DVD, limited A version only)	12	JPN: 3,173
To.	Released: November 13, 2024; Label: Tokuma Japan Communications; Formats: CD, DVD, digital download, streaming	14	JPN: 4,417

=== Single albums ===
Title	Details	Peak chart positions	Sales
Title	Details	KOR	Sales
What's Goin' On	Released: September 6, 2021; Label: Spire Entertainment; Formats: CD, digital download, streaming; Track listing: 1. "What's Goin' On"; 2. "Baila Con OX"	6	KOR: 56,703

=== Singles ===
List of singles
Title	Year	Album
"Vamos"	2021	Vamos
"What's Goin' On"	2021	What's Goin' On
"Love Me Like"	2022	Love Me Like
"Play Dumb"	2022	Story Written in Music
"Dream" (드림)	2022	Non-album single
"Junk Food"	2023	Iykyk
"Uncapped"	2026	Uncapped
"Renegade"	2026	Non-album single
Japanese
"Stand Up!"	2022	Stand Up!
"Cool My Head"	2024	To.
OX:N (sub-unit)
"You"	2025	N
"Love+"	2025	Non-album single
"Swirky" (Japanese)	2025	Sway

=== As collaborating artist ===
Title	Year	Album
"Jamboree Anthem Korea" (with BugAboo)	2022	Non-album single

=== Soundtrack appearances ===
Title	Year	Member(s)	Album
"Come Together"	2023	Jaehan (Note: Credited as Omega X but features only Jaehan)	A Shoulder to Cry On OST
"You, Again"	2023	Taedong, Xen, Jaehan (Note: Credited as Omega X but features only Taedong, Xen, and Jaehan)	A Shoulder to Cry On OST
"Comfort"	2023	Jaehan and Hwichan (Note: Credited as Omega X but features only Jaehan and Hwichan)	A Shoulder to Cry On OST
"Tears Pouring Down"	2023	Hwichan	Love After Divorce Season 4 OST
"Come in Closer"	2023	Xen	Love After Divorce Season 4 OST

== Filmography ==
=== Web shows ===
Year	Title		Platform	Notes	Ref.
Year	English	Korean	Platform	Notes	Ref.
2021	Loading One More ChanX	로딩 원 모어 찬스	YouTube & V Live	Pre-debut reality show	

== Radio show ==
Year	Title		Channel	Role	Notes	Ref.
Year	English	Korean	Channel	Role	Notes	Ref.
2023–present	X’s Overindulgence	X의 과몰입	FLO	DJ	March 1–present	
2023–present	To the Beautiful Us	아름다운 우리에게	Naver VIBE	DJ	May 4–present	

== Ambassadorship ==
- Honorary ambassador for Jeju Tourism, 2021
- Ambassador for COEX Urban Park Festival, 2021
- Public Relations Ambassador for Asia Exchange Association, 2021
- Honorary Ambassador for The Association For International Sport for All (TAFISA), 2021
- Public Relations Ambassador for COEX Winter Gallery 2021

== Awards and nominations ==
Name of the award ceremony, year presented, award category, nominee(s) of the award, and the result of the nomination
Award ceremony	Year	Category	Nominee(s)/work(s)	Result	Ref.
Gaon Chart Music Awards	2022	New Artist of the Year — Physical Album	What's Goin' On	Nominated	
Golden Disc Awards	2022	Rookie of the Year Award	Omega X	Nominated	
Golden Disc Awards	2022	Seezn Most Popular Artist Award	Omega X	Nominated	
Hanteo Music Awards	2021	Rookie Award – Male Group	Omega X	Nominated	
Hanteo Music Awards	2023	Emerging Artist Award	Omega X	Nominated	
Seoul Music Awards	2022	Rookie of the Year	Omega X	Won	
Seoul Music Awards	2022	Popularity Award	Omega X	Nominated	
Seoul Music Awards	2022	K-wave Popularity Award	Omega X	Nominated	
The Fact Music Awards	2023	Fan N Star Four Star Award	Omega X	Nominated	

=== Listicles ===
Name of publisher, year listed, name of listicle, and placement
Publisher	Year	Listicle	Placement	Ref.
Rolling Stone India	2021	10 Best K-pop Debuts of 2021	7th	
