= Jae Park =

American singer (born 1992)

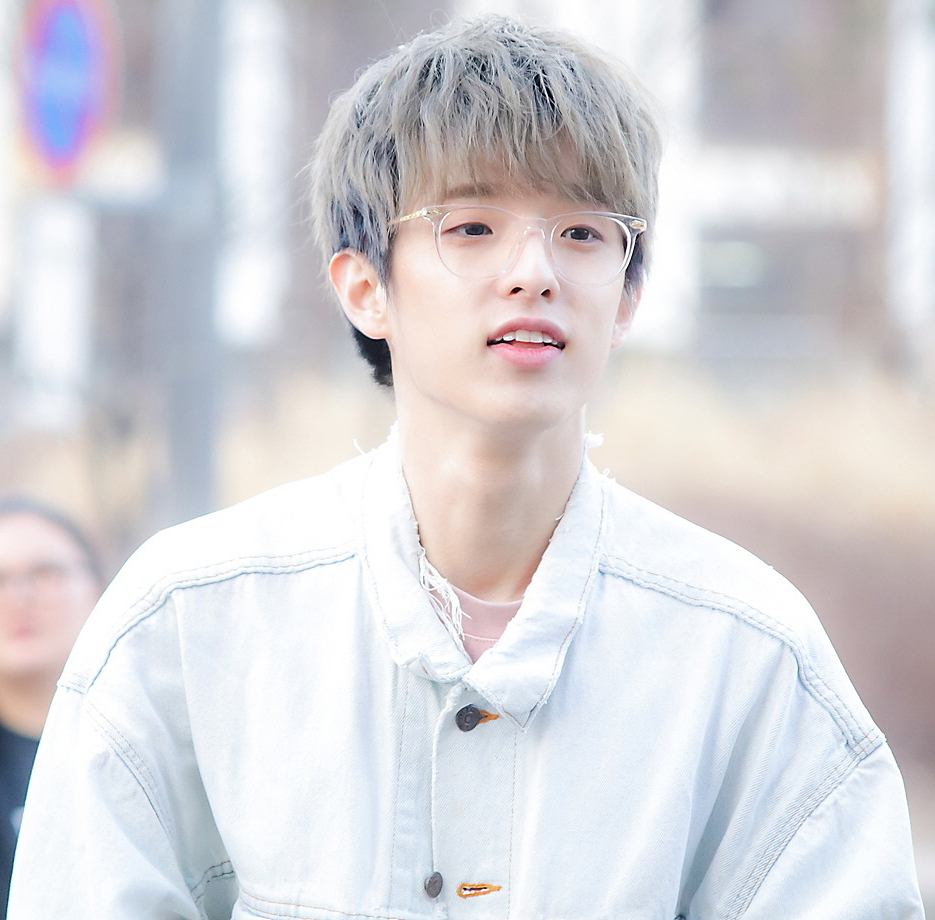
- Park in 2017
- Born: Park Jae-hyung; September 15, 1992 (age 34); Buenos Aires, Argentina
- Other names: Jae, eaJ
- Citizenship: Argentina, United States
- Education: Cerritos High School; California State University, Long Beach
- Occupations: Singer; songwriter; musician
- Musical career
- Genres: K-pop; pop rock
- Instruments: Vocals; guitar
- Years active: 2015–present
- Labels: JYP; The Wizard Room
- Formerly of: Day6; JYP Nation

Korean name
- Hangul: 박제형
- RR: Bak Jehyeong
- MR: Pak Chehyŏng

Park Jae-hyung (Korean: 박제형; born September 15, 1992), known professionally as Jae Park, Jae or eaJ (제이), is an American singer, songwriter, and former member of the South Korean pop rock band Day6. He gained early recognition by competing in the first season of K-pop Star in 2012, where he finished in sixth place before signing with JYP Entertainment. Park debuted as the lead guitarist and vocalist of Day6 in September 2015 and was with the group until his departure in December 2021.

In addition to his work with Day6, Park pursued a solo career under the stage name eaJ, launching the eaJ Project in 2020, where he released several self-written tracks on YouTube and SoundCloud. He has collaborated with various artists, including Seori, Keshi, and DPR Live, and was the co-host of the award-winning How Did I Get Here? podcast. Park is also known for his work as an MC on After School Club and his appearances at Head in the Clouds festivals.

As a mental health advocate, Park has spoken openly about his struggles with panic disorder and created the From Friends project, which raised $100,000 for the Jed Foundation to provide free mental health resources. He continues his solo music career, releasing multiple EPs, including Laughing in Insomnia (2023) and Medicated Insomnia (2023).

== Early life ==
Jae Park was born in Buenos Aires, Argentina and moved to Cerritos, California in early childhood. He graduated from Cerritos High School and later studied political science at California State University, Long Beach. Throughout high school and university, he ran a YouTube channel, "YellowPostItMan", where he uploaded vocal-and-guitar song covers as a hobby.

In 2012, Park took a leave from university to compete as a singer-guitarist in the inaugural season of K-pop Star. Though he was eliminated from the competition in sixth place, JYP Entertainment (JYPE) offered Park a contract at the end of the show to join the company as a trainee for an upcoming band. Park accepted the offer and moved to South Korea.

== Career ==
=== Debut with Day6 and first solo activities (2015–2018) ===
Park debuted on September 7, 2015, as a vocalist and electric guitarist of JYP's first rock band, Day6. The band debuted with their first extended play The Day, with the lead single "Congratulations".

On June 28, 2016, Park became an MC of Arirang's After School Club, a televised music talk show, alongside Jimin Park, labelmate under JYP Entertainment, and Kevin Woo, formerly of U-KISS. He officially graduated as an MC of ASC on July 17, 2018.

In 2017, Park opened his YouTube channel with the name JaeSix and published his first video on September 6, 2017. Over the next year, he uploaded videos of behind-the-scenes vlogs with Day6, as well as videos of activities with his friends. His "season one finale" was posted on July 6, 2018. A singular video was posted as part of "season 1.5" on October 10, 2018, marking the final JaeSix upload.

=== Rebranding to begin solo music career (2020–2021) ===
Under the name eaJ, Park began a personal music project in 2020, called the eaJ Project, releasing self-written solo tracks. The first song, titled "LA TRAINS", was released on January 16, 2020 on SoundCloud and YouTube. With the start of his music project, he also made private all his previously published YouTube videos for JaeSix. His fourth song of the project, "Pinocchio", was later made private on his YouTube channel after the end of 2021. The fifth song, "Rose", was the only song to have a teaser clip posted before its release. He released eight songs through the eaJ Project, with the final song of the project, "Pacman", being released on July 5, 2020.

On February 5, 2020, Park started his first podcast "How Did I Get Here?", abbreviated as HDIGH, as Jae of Day6, with Dive Studios. With episodes released every Tuesday, it quickly gained a sizeable audience. Fellow singer AleXa hosted takeover episodes starting from episode #21 until eaJ returned on September 9 in episode #28, and from then onwards, both co-hosted the podcast. HDIGH Podcast won "People's Choice" and "Entertainment" Category by Podcast Award in 2020 and Best Podcast 2020 by Apple Podcast. After over a year of activity, episode #70, the last episode, was released on June 2, 2021.

On May 10, 2020, Park's activities with Day6 were placed on hold as the group took a hiatus to focus on their health, the day before their sixth extended play The Book of Us: The Demon, with the lead single "Zombie", was released on May 11, 2020. During 2020, Park began streaming on Twitch, becoming acquainted with OfflineTV and Friends. He created his own clothing line called "From Friends" with Represent.

On September 16, 2020, Park announced his first collaboration, with Seori for "It Just Is", released on YouTube on September 22. The song also featured Keshi contributing on production with guitar. The video animation was done by the artist Deisa. On September 21, 2020, Park and 2PM's Nichkhun took on roles as members of crime-fighting boyband "4 2 Sing" in season three of Big Hero 6: The Series. Park played twins Kwang-Sun and Ye Joon, one half of the boy band "4 2 Sing". On November 27, 2020, DPR Live featured Crush and Park on the single "Jam & Butterfly". On December 3, 2020, Park and Keshi released their collaboration single titled "pillows" on YouTube.

On April 19, 2021, after the group's hiatus for their health, Day6, including Park, released their seventh extended play The Book of Us: Negentropy, with the lead single "You Make Me". The group did no promotions for the album. This was the last Day6 release to feature Park. Park was featured on Seori's single "Dive with You", released on August 22, 2021. Park performed at Head in the Clouds Festival 2021 on November 6 to 7, 2021 at the Brookside at the Rose Bowl in Pasadena, California.

=== Departure from Day6 and official solo debut (2021–present) ===
On December 31, 2021, Park announced via Twitter that he would be taking a hiatus from his promotions after 6 years as a member of Day6. The same day, JYP Entertainment announced that Park would be leaving the band and ending his exclusive contract with the company for personal reasons.

On April 8, 2022, Park released a single titled "Car Crash" on music streaming platforms, starring gaming streamers Valkyrae and Kyedae from 100 Thieves in its music video directed by John Lee. This release marked his official solo debut.

On April 11, 2022, Park released the music video for the song "Sincerely", on YouTube. "Sincerely", was later included on his second EP, Smiling in Insomnia, in April 2023.

On May 25, 2022, Park released his second "Mindset Collection" through the platform Dive Studios.

Park performed at Head in the Clouds Festival 2022 on August 20 to 21, 2022 at Brookside at the Rose Bowl in Pasadena, California.

On October 28, Park performed as a guest artist at the MAX - North America Tour 2022 show at The Wiltern in Los Angeles, California.

For the first time in his solo career, Park performed as a headliner artist at Head in the Clouds Festival 2022, which took place at Community Park PIK2 in Jakarta, Indonesia on December 3 to 4, 2022.

In December 2022, Park embarked on his first Asia Tour with 2 shows: one at Clapper Studio in Taipei, Taiwan on December 6, 2022 and another at Gateway Theatre in Singapore on December 8, 2022. On December 8, 2022, Park released a single, "Typical Story", on streaming platforms. The song was later included on his debut EP, Laughing in Insomnia in February.

Park performed as a headliner artist at Head in the Clouds Festival 2022, which took place at SM Festival Grounds Parañaque City in Manila, Philippines on December 9 to 10, 2022.

On February 3, 2023, Park released his first EP, Laughing in Insomnia, on streaming platforms, including the single "Typical Story", previously released in December. He also published a visualizer for the second track, "Sober Go Away", on YouTube on the release day.

Shortly after, Park released his second EP, Smiling in Insomnia, on April 21, 2023.

Park's third EP, Medicated Insomnia, was released on June 30, 2023. It included the pre-release single, "In My Civic", as well as releasing for the first time on streaming platforms three of the songs that had previously been released in 2020 as part of the eaJ Project: "LA Trains", "50 Proof", and "Pacman", with the titles of "LA Trains" and "Pacman" being re-stylized in lowercase. It also included the song "Sincerely", which he had previously released on YouTube a year ago in April 2022.

Park was featured on Vaultboy's single "Everything, Everywhere", released on November 3, 2023.

On January 17, 2024, Park worked with Zaya Lyn to release a "Ghibli inspired version" of his song "Castle in the Sky", originally released in February 2023 on his first EP Laughing in Insomnia. The single also included an instrumental version.

Park released the single "Mad" on February 23, 2024. He released the single "Friendly Fire" on May 10 and released a visualizer for the song on May 24.

Park and Hindia collaborated for the single "Right Where You Left Me", released on July 5, 2024, with its accompanying visualizer.

On September 1, 2024, Park embarked on his first world tour when the rain stopped following me featuring cities in Asia and North America. He concurrently served as an opening act for part of the North American Imagine Dragons's Loom World Tour.

In 2025, Park collaborated with the Pinoy pop girl group Bini for the single "Secrets", which was released on February 27 as part of Bini's EP Biniverse. He would perform the song with BINI song during the Los Angeles leg of the Biniverse World Tour 2025.

== Personal life ==
On May 10, 2020, JYP Entertainment announced that Day6 would be taking a hiatus due to the mental health concerns of some members. In an interview with Allure, Park revealed that he had a panic attack and was diagnosed with panic disorder in April 2020. Almost a week after JYP's official announcement, Park shared on his personal Twitter account an update on his condition and began sharing his experiences with mental health.

On September 15, 2020, Park initiated From Friends, a project partnered with Represent, selling clothing and other merchandise. The campaign raised $100,000 which was donated to the Jed Foundation, which helps provide free mental health resources to teenagers and young adults.

== Discography ==
=== Extended plays ===
List of extended plays and showing selected details
Title	EP details
Laughing in Insomnia	Released: February 3, 2023; Label: The Wizard Room; Formats: Digital download, streaming; Track listing: 1. "Typical Story"; 2. "Sober Go Away"; 3. "Traveler"; 4. "Wallflower"; 5. "Castle in the Sky"
Smiling in Insomnia	Released: April 21, 2023; Label: eaJ's notepad; Formats: Digital download, streaming; Track listing: 1. "Enemy"; 2. "Lennon; 3. "LA Stars"; 4. "Safe in the Rain"; 5. "No One's Fault"; 6. "Visions"
Medicated Insomnia	Released: June 30, 2023; Label: eaJ's notepad; Formats: Digital download, streaming; Track listing: 1. "LA Trains"; 2. "Sincerely,"; 3. "50 Proof"; 4. "Pacman"; 5. "In My Civic"
When the Rain Stopped Following Me	Released: September 20, 2024; Label: eaJ's notepad; Formats: Digital download, streaming; Track listing: 1. "I Just Want My 20s Back"; 2. "Mad"; 3. "Friendly Fire"; 4. "Right Where You Left Me" (with Hindia); 5. "Burn" (with Salem Ilese); 6. "When the Rain Stops"
1	Released: June 27, 2025; Label: Position Music; Formats: Digital download, streaming; Track listing: 1. "Ruin My Life"; 2. "Merry Go Round"; 3. "Pause"; 4. "RED"

=== Singles ===
==== As lead artist ====
List of singles as lead artist, showing year released and album name
Title	Year	Album	Notes
"Better Man"	2012	Non-album singles	Released under the name "Jae Park" rather than "eaJ"
"Car Crash"	2022	Non-album singles	
"Typical Story"	2022	Laughing in Insomnia	
"Visions" (with Valorant and Safari Riot)	2023	Non-album single	
"Enemy"	2023	Smiling in Insomnia	
"Lennon"	2023	Smiling in Insomnia	
"LA Stars"	2023	Smiling in Insomnia	
"Safe in the Rain"	2023	Smiling in Insomnia	
"In My Civic"	2023	Medicated Insomnia	
"Castle in the Sky (Ghibli Inspired Version)" (with Zaya Lyn)	2024	Non-album single	
"Mad"	2024	When the Rain Stopped Following Me	
"Friendly Fire"	2024	When the Rain Stopped Following Me	
"Right Where You Left Me" (with Hindia)	2024	When the Rain Stopped Following Me	
"Burn" (with Salem Ilese)	2024	When the Rain Stopped Following Me	
"Ruin My Life"	2025	1	
"Merry Go Round"	2025	1	
"LA Traffic (/)"	2025	Non-album singles	
"Put It On Me"	2025	Non-album singles	

==== As featured artist ====
List of singles as featured artist, showing year released, selected chart positions and album name
Title	Year	Peak chart positions	Album
Title	Year	KOR	Album
"Jam & Butterfly" (DPR Live featuring Crush and eaJ)	2020	—	Non-album single
"Working for the Weekend" (Party Pupils Remix) (Max featuring eaJ)	2021	—	Colour Vision (Deluxe)
"Dive with You" (Seori featuring eaJ)	2021	— (Note: "Dive with You" did not enter the Gaon Digital Chart, but peaked at number 75 on the Gaon Download Chart.)	Non-album singles
"Stab" (Big Naughty featuring eaJ)	2021	— (Note: "Stab" did not enter the Gaon Digital Chart, but peaked at number 149 on the Gaon Download Chart.)	Non-album singles
"Everything, Everywhere" (vaultboy featuring eaJ)	2023	—	Everything and Nothing
"Imagine" (slchld featuring eaJ)	2024	—	Apology
"Secrets" (Bini featuring eaJ)	2025	—	Biniverse
"Ever After" (MICO featuring eaJ)	2025	—	Non-album single
"—" denotes items which were not released in that country or did not chart.

=== Soundtrack appearances ===
List of soundtrack appearances, showing year released, selected chart positions, and name of the album
Title	Year	Album
"See"	2024	Jentry Chau vs. the Underworld (soundtrack from the Netflix series)

== Filmography ==
=== Television shows ===
Year	Title	Role	Note	Ref
2011	K-pop Star season 1	Contestant	Placed in the top six	
2016	Cool Kiz on the Block	Contestant	Badminton episode 164–165	
2016–2018	After School Club	Host	Episodes 218–324, graduated episode 325	
2020	Big Hero 6: The Series	Kwang-Sun and Ye Joon (voice)	Episode: "Big Hero Battle"	

=== Podcasts ===
Year	Title	Role	Note	Ref
2020–2021	How Did I Get Here? (HDIGH)	Co-host		
