= Royal Pirates =

South Korean band

Royal Pirates 로열 파이럿츠
- Also known as: Fading From Dawn (2004–2008)
- Origin: Seoul, South Korea
- Genre: Rock
- Years active: 2004–2016
- Labels: Apple of the Eye; Universal Music Korea
- Members: Kim Moon-chul; Sooyoon
- Past members: Richard Kim; James Lee

Royal Pirates (Korean: 로열 파이럿츠) is a Korean-American rock band which debuted in 2013. The band currently consists of Kim Moon-chul (vocals, guitar), and Sooyoon (drums).

== Members ==
Current members

- Moon Kim – lead vocalist, guitar (2004–present)
- Sooyoon Kim – drums (2004–present)

Former members

- Richard Kim – bass (2004–2008; his death)
- James Lee – bass guitar, keyboardist (2009–2017)

Temporary member

- Enik Lin – synth

== History ==
=== 2004–2008: Formation as Fading From Dawn, Richard's death, and renaming ===
From 2004, the group was formerly known as Fading From Dawn, with the three members being guitarist-vocalist Kim Moon-chul, drummer Soo-yoon and bassist Richard Kim, Moon-chul's older brother. They used to play at several Korean events in California, such as the annual Korean Festival in Orange County. After Richard's death in April 2008 in a car accident in Pomona, California, they rarely played live since they had no bass player. They also changed their band name to Royal Pirates.

=== 2009–2012: Popularity, YouTube and demo releases ===
With their talent and originality, Royal Pirates gained fame on YouTube by uploading covers. In September 2008, Moon-chul and Soo-yoon posted their first cover "Time is Running Out" by Muse on their YouTube account. After that, they continued uploading rock versions of hit songs such as "Nobody" by Wonder Girls, "Mirotic" by DBSK, and "Circus" by Britney Spears, the latter reached 18 thousand viewers in just two weeks and was also featured on Britney's homepage.

Their first original demo was released on the internet was "Royal Villain". Soo-yoon's song "Like Butterflies" was also released soon after.

In May 2009, Royal Pirates appeared on Korean News Channel YTN where they were presented as an independent rock band who had become a new YouTube sensation, garnering over ten thousand views.

They covered the song "Sorry Sorry" by Super Junior in Spring 2009. After the video was posted on the Korean website Cyworld, the band received an invitation from the writer of Star King to appear on his show.

James Lee joined Royal Pirates as a bassist in September 2009, and in October 2009, Royal Pirates appeared on KOME channel to introduce their new bassist.

In March 2010, Royal Pirates released the music video for their new original song and demo "Disappear". They declared, "This is not the actual debut of Royal Pirates. This MV was made independently for the fans and also for promotion of the band."

=== 2013–present: Official Debut, Drawing the Line, Japanese debut, world tour, and James's departure ===
Royal Pirates made their Korean debut on August 25, 2013, at Inkigayo with their digital single "Shout Out".

On January 15, 2014, Royal Pirates released their first EP in Korea "Drawing The Line.

On March 24th 2014, Royal Pirates released their first album in Japan "Shout Out", which also included English versions of the songs Shout Out, Drawing The Line and Fly To You.

Royal Pirates performed on several music programs as guests of Kim Kyung Rok of "VOS".

The band also performed on a world tour with actor Lee Min Ho. As guests on the Reboot: Minho Tour, they performed at venues in South Korea, Japan, China and more.

On August 27, 2014, Royal Pirates released their second EP "Love Toxic", which included the English versions of the songs "Betting Everything" and "You". The band then later released a Taiwanese Deluxe version of their "Love Toxic" EP, featuring tracks from the "Drawing The Line" EP, as well as a Japanese edition, which included the Japanese version of the title track "Love Toxic".

On November 30th, 2015, the 3 members of Royal Pirates returned with a 6 track EP titled "3.3". Their title track "Run Away" was made into a music video. Prior to this comeback, member James Lee had a nearly-fatal freak accident which caused him to give up playing the bass after 13 years. However, he returned to play the keyboard for the music video of "Run Away". Enik Lin of EDM group IAMMEDIC also helped write and produce the track, and can be seen in the music videos for both "Run Away" and "Dangerous".

James Lee announced his departure from the band on January 31, 2017 via a handwritten letter on his Instagram account.

== Discography ==
=== EPs ===
Title	Album details	Peak chart positions	Sales
Title	Album details	KOR	Sales
Drawing the Line	Released: January 15, 2014; Label: Apple of the Eye; Format: CD, digital download; Track List: 1. Drawing the Line; 2. You; 3. See What I See; 4. Fly To You; 5. On My Mind (Lounge Mix Version); 6. Drawing the Line (English Version)	41	KOR: 702+
Shout Out (Japan Edition)	Released: March 24, 2014; Label: Apple of the Eye; Format: CD, digital download; Track List: 1. Shout Out (English Version); 2. You (Korean Version); 3. Drawing the Line (English Version); 4. On My Mind Lounge Mix (Korean Version); 5. Fly to You (English Version); 6. Shout Out (Korean Version)	—	KOR: —
Love Toxic	Released: August 27, 2014; Label: Apple of the Eye; Format: CD, digital download; Track List: 1. 하루다 지나가겠다 (Haru); 2. 사랑에 빠져 (Love Toxic); 3. 서울촌놈 (Seoul Hillbilly); 4. Betting Everything (English Version); 5. You (English Version); Track List – Taiwan Edition: 1. 하루다 지나가겠다 (Haru) （一天過去）; 2. 사랑에 빠져 (Love Toxic) （墜入情網）; 3. 서울촌놈 (Seoul Hillbilly) （首爾鄉巴佬）; 4. Betting Everything; 5. You (English Version); 6. Betting Everything (Acoustic Version); 7. Drawing the Line; 8. You; 9. See What I See; 10. Fly to You; 11. On My Mind (Lounge Mix Version); 12. Drawing the Line (English Version)	18	KOR: 807+
3.3	Released: December 1, 2015; Label: Apple of the Eye; Format: CD, digital download; Track List: 1. Let U Go; 2. Too Fast; 3. Run Away; 4. U & I 5. Dangerous; 6. Without You	30	KOR: 1,295+
"—" denotes releases that did not chart or were not released in that region.

=== Singles ===
Title	Year	Peak chart position		Sales (Digital download)	Album
Title	Year	KOR	KOR Hot 100	Sales (Digital download)	Album
"Shout Out"	2013	—	—	KOR: —	Non-album single
"Drawing The Line"	2014	358	—	KOR: 4,408+	Drawing The Line
"Betting Everything"	2014	353	—N/a	KOR: 3,891+	Love Toxic
"Seoul Hillbilly"	2014	—	—N/a	KOR: —	Love Toxic
"Love Toxic"	2014	309	—N/a	KOR: 5,088+	Love Toxic
"Run Away"	2015	—	—N/a	KOR: —	3.3
"—" denotes releases that did not chart or were not released in that region

== Filmography ==
=== Music videos ===
Publishing Date	Track Name
August 25, 2013	Shout Out (Synth Rock Version)
January 14, 2014	Drawing The Line
January 16, 2014	Drawing The Line (Band Version)
July 31, 2014	Betting Everything Acoustic Ver
August 13, 2014	서울 촌놈 (Seoul Hillbilly)
August 26, 2014	사랑에 빠져 (Love Toxic)
August 31, 2014	사랑에 빠져 (Love Toxic) (Performance ver.)
October 7, 2014	사랑에 빠져 (Love Toxic) (Chinese Subbed by Universal Music Taiwan)
November 30, 2015	Run Away
January 28, 2016	Dangerous

== Awards ==
- Energy FM KPOP-Hall of Fame Award "Love Toxic" (October 12 – November 2, 2014)

=== Exclusive Video ===
==== RP TV ====
Published on official YouTube channel.
