= Seven O'Clock =

South Korean boy group

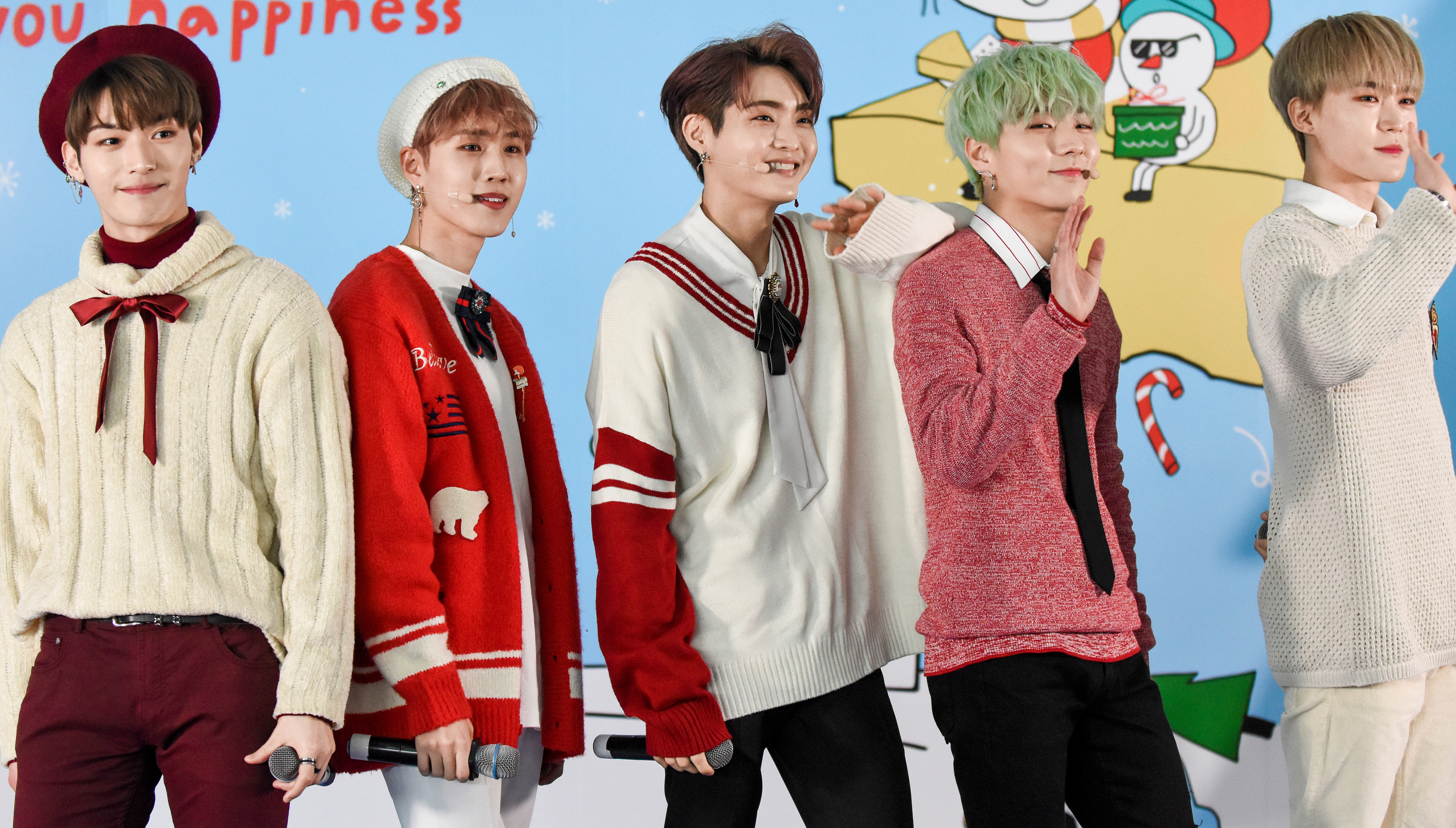
- Seven O'Clock performing at the C-Festival, December 2019; from left: Hangyeom, 2Soul, Andy, Taeyoung, Rui

Background information
- Origin: Seoul, South Korea
- Genres: K-pop
- Years active: 2017–2021
- Labels: Staro Entertainment; Forest Network
- Past members: Hangyeom; Hyun; 2 Soul; Jeonggyu; Taeyoung; Andy; Rui; Vaan
- Website: staroent.com

Seven O'Clock (Korean: 세븐어클락) was a South Korean boy band formed by Staro Entertainment and KDH Entertainment in 2017. They debuted on March 16, 2017, with Butterfly Effect. They officially disbanded on March 2, 2021.

== Career ==
=== 2017–2018: Butterfly Effect and #7 ===
Seven O'Clock released their debut mini-album Butterfly Effect and its lead single "Echo" on March 16, 2017.

On September 19, 2018, it was announced via their fan café that Vann had left Seven O'Clock, and that the group would now be managed by Forest Network. On September 21, members A-Day and Younghoon changed their stage names to Hangyeom and 2Soul, respectively. Seven O'Clock released their second mini-album #7 and lead single "Nothing Better" on October 8, 2018.

=== 2019–2021 Lineup Changes, "Get Away", "Highway" and disbandment ===
On February 8, 2019, Andy was announced as a new member of the group. Seven O'clock released their first digital single "Get Away" on February 21.

On October 4, Forest Network announced the addition of two new members, Rui and Eungyul, while also stating that Jeonggyu, Hyun, and 2Soul would be going on a temporary hiatus to focus on their health. In the meantime, the group would be a five-piece. Four days later, it was announced that 2Soul had recovered from his health issues and would be returning to the group. On October 18, Forest Network announced that Eungyul would not be taking part in Seven O'Clock activities for personal reasons. They released their third mini-album White Night on November 12, 2019.

On August 29, 2020, Seven O'Clock released their 5th project album Highway with the lead single "Hey There". They hosted their World Live Showcase on the same day.

On March 2, 2021, it was announced that the group had disbanded.

== Past members ==
- Hangyeom (한겸)
- 2 Soul (이솔)
- Taeyoung (태영)
- Andy (앤디)
- Rui (루이)
- Jeonggyu (정규)
- Hyun (현)
- Vaan (반)

== Discography ==
=== Extended plays ===
Title	Album details	Peak chart positions	Sales
Title	Album details	KOR	Sales
Butterfly Effect	Released: March 16, 2017; Label: Staro Entertainment, KDH Entertainment, Genie Music; Formats: CD, digital download; Track listing: 1. Echo (시계바늘); 2. Time Machine; 3. Halley; 4. Yesterday (그래 그랬어)	38	KOR: 615+
#7	Released: October 6, 2018; Label: Forest Network, LOEN Entertainment; Formats: CD, digital download; Track listing: 1. Take It On; 2. Nothing Better; 3. Searchlight; 4. Eyes On You; 5. Heal Me	29	KOR: 1,751+
White Night	Released: November 12, 2019; Label: Forest Network, Kakao M; Formats: CD, digital download	51	KOR: 1,803+

=== Single albums ===
Title	Album details	Peak chart positions	Sales
Title	Album details	KOR	Sales
Highway	Released: August 22, 2020; Label: Forest Network, Kakao M; Formats: CD, digital download	—	KOR : TBA

=== Singles ===
Title	Year	Album
"Echo"	2017	Butterfly Effect
"Nothing Better"	2018	#7
"Searchlight"	2018	#7
"Get Away"	2019	Get Away
"Midnight Sun"	2019	White Night
"Hey There"	2020	Highway
