= List of songs recorded by Day6 =

Here is a complete list of songs by the South Korean band Day6.

== 0-9 ==
Song	Artist(s)	Writer(s)			Album/Single	Language	Year	Ref.
Song	Artist(s)	Lyrics	Composition	Arrangement	Album/Single	Language	Year	Ref.
"1 to 10"	Day6	Young K	Jae; Sungjin; Young K Wonpil; Hong Ji-sang	Hong Ji-sang	The Book of Us: The Demon	Korean	2020	
"121U"	Day6	Young K	Jae; Sungjin; Young K Wonpil; Lee Woo-min; Hong Ji-sang	Lee Woo-min; Hong Ji-sang	Remember Us: Youth Part 2	Korean	2018	
"20 (Feat. Young K)" (Young해 (Feat. Young K))	Jamie; Young K	Jamie; Young K	Jamie; 220; Royal Dive	220; Royal Dive	19 to 20	Korean	2016	
"365247"	Day6	Young K	Young K FRANTS	FRANTS	The Book of Us: Entropy	Korean	2019	
"7-ELEVEN with you" (너의 곁에 세븐일레븐)	Young K		Young K paulkyte	paulkyte	Non-album single	Korean	2023	

== A ==
Song	Artist(s)	Writer(s)			Album/Single	Language	Year	Ref.
Song	Artist(s)	Lyrics	Composition	Arrangement	Album/Single	Language	Year	Ref.
"A Hundred Whys for Goodbye (with JINJOO of DNCE)" (우리가 헤어질 100가지 이유)	Young K		BUMZU; Young K	BUMZU	YOUNGEST	Korean	2026	
"A Journey" (행운을 빌어 줘)	Wonpil		Wonpil; Hong Ji-sang	Hong Ji-sang	Pilmography	Korean	2022	
"A Writer in a Love Story" (소설 속의 작가가 되어)	Wonpil		Ming Ji-syeon; Wonpil	Ming Ji-syeon	Pilmography	Korean	2022	
"About Now" (지금쯤)	Day6	Jae; Kevin Cho		Kevin Cho	The Book of Us: Entropy	Korean	2019	
"Above the Clouds" (구름 위에서)	Day6	Jae; Sungjin; Young K	Jae; Sungjin; Young K Wonpil; Hong Ji-sang	Sungjin; Hong Ji-sang	The Book of Us: Negentropy	Korean	2021	
"Afraid"	Day6	Sungjin; Jeon Da-sol; Jae Dogi		Jae Dogi	The Book of Us: The Demon	Korean	2020	
"After" (시간의 잔상)	Wonpil	Kul Dan-ji			Non-album single	Korean	2024	
"All Alone" (혼자야)	Day6	Young K	Hong Ji-sang; Jae; Sungjin; Young K Wonpil	Hong Ji-sang	Every Day6 November	Korean	2017	
"All Alone" (혼자야)	Day6	Young K	Hong Ji-sang; Jae; Sungjin; Young K Wonpil	Hong Ji-sang	Moonrise	Korean	2017	
"All the Things You Wanted" (네가 원했던 것들)	Day6 (Even of Day)	Young K	Young K Wonpil; Hong Ji-sang	Hong Ji-sang	Right Through Me	Korean	2021	
"Already Grown Up" (어른이 되어 버렸다)	Wonpil	Wonpil; Hong Ji-sang		Hong Ji-sang	Unpiltered	Korean	2026	
"Am I In Love?" (아마도 사랑인가 봐)	Young K	D'tour	Aaron Kim; D'tour; Lee Yoo-young	Aaron Kim; Lee Yoo-young	Non-album single	Korean	2023	
"Anthem" (응원가)	Young K	Young K	Lee Woo-min; Young K	Lee Woo-min	YOUNGEST	Korean	2026	
"as always" (나무는 결국 겨울을 견뎌낼 거야)	Sungjin		Sungjin; Sim Hyun; Oh Ji-hyun	Sim Hyun; Oh Ji-hyun	30	Korean	2024	

== B ==
Song	Artist(s)	Writer(s)			Album/Single	Language	Year	Ref.
Song	Artist(s)	Lyrics	Composition	Arrangement	Album/Single	Language	Year	Ref.
"babo"	Young K		Young K paulkyte	paulkyte	Letters with Notes	Korean	2023	
"Baby, It's Okay"	Day6	Young K YHANAEL	Hong Ji-sang; Lee Woo-min; Jae; Sungjin; Young K Wonpil	Hong Ji-sang; Lee Woo-min	Unlock	Japanese	2018	
"Be Lazy"	Day6	Young K	220; Young K	220	Every Day6 July	Korean	2017	
"Be Lazy"	Day6	Young K	220; Young K	220	Moonrise	Korean	2017	
"Beautiful Feeling"	Day6	Young K Isaac Han	Young K Isaac Han atomik	Isaac Han atomik	Non-album single	Korean	2018	
"Beautiful Feeling"	Day6	Young K Isaac Han	Young K Isaac Han atomik	Isaac Han atomik	Remember Us: Youth Part 2	Korean	2018	
"Before the Stars" (별들 앞에서)	Day6	Young K Hong Ji-sang	Sungjin; Hong Ji-sang	Hong Ji-sang	The Decade	Korean	2025	
"Best Part"	Day6	Young K	Jae; Sungjin; Young K Wonpil; Hong Ji-sang	Hong Ji-sang	The Book of Us: Gravity	Korean	2019	
"best song" (베스트 송)	Young K	Young K	Young K Hong Ji-sang	Hong Ji-sang	Eternal	Korean	2021	
"Better Better"	Day6	Young K	Hong Ji-sang; Lee Woo-min; Jae; Sungjin; Young K Wonpil	Hong Ji-sang; Lee Woo-min	Moonrise	Korean	2017	
"Better Day"	Young K	Young K	Hollyway; Kim Dae-hyun	Hollyway	Non-album single	Korean	2023	
"Blood"	Day6	Jae; Young K	220; Andrew Choi; Jae; Young K	220	Daydream	Korean	2016	
"Breaking Down"	Day6	Young K	Cha Il-hoon; YUE; Young K	Cha Il-hoon; YUE; REX	Unlock	Japanese	2018	
"Bungee Jumping"	Young K	Young K	Young K Sim Hyun	Sim Hyun	Letters with Notes	Korean	2023	
"Butterfly" (나비)	Young K	Han Kyung-su; Lee Do-hyeong		Park Jeong-jun; Lim Jun-sik	Castaway Diva OST	Korean	2023	

== C ==
Song	Artist(s)	Writer(s)			Album/Single	Language	Year	Ref.
Song	Artist(s)	Lyrics	Composition	Arrangement	Album/Single	Language	Year	Ref.
"Check Pattern"	Sungjin	Sungjin; Lee Joo-hyoung; Jukjae		Lee Joo-hyoung; Jukjae	30	Korean	2024	
"Chocolate"	Day6	J.Y. Park; Jae; Wonpil	Jae; Wonpil; MAJORCODE; Moon Sang-sun	MAJORCODE; Moon Sang-sun	Want More 19 OST	Korean	2018	
"Colors"	Day6	MR.CHO; Jae; Sungjin; Lim Jun-hyeok; Young K Wonpil; Dowoon	MR.CHO; Jeon Jeong-hoon; Cheongdamdong Park Gun-woo; Jae; Sungjin; Lim Jun-hyeok; Young K Wonpil; Dowoon		The Day	Korean	2015	
"Colors (Final Ver.)"	Day6	MR.CHO; Jae; Sungjin; Lim Jun-hyeok; Young K Wonpil; Dowoon	MR.CHO; Jeon Jeong-hoon; Cheongdamdong Park Gun-woo; Jae; Sungjin; Lim Jun-hyeok; Young K Wonpil; Dowoon		Moonrise	Korean	2017	
"come as you are" (그대로 와 줘요)	Young K		Young K Hong Ji-sang	Hong Ji-sang	Eternal	Korean	2021	
"Congratulations"	Day6	Jae; Sungjin; Lim Jun-hyeok; Young K Wonpil; Dowoon	Hong Ji-sang; Lee Woo-min; Jae; Sungjin; Lim Jun-hyeok; Young K Wonpil; Dowoon	Hong Ji-sang; Lee Woo-min	The Day	Korean	2015	
"Congratulations (Final Ver.)"	Day6	Jae; Sungjin; Lim Jun-hyeok; Young K Wonpil; Dowoon	Hong Ji-sang; Lee Woo-min; Jae; Sungjin; Lim Jun-hyeok; Young K Wonpil; Dowoon	Hong Ji-sang; Lee Woo-min	Sunrise	Korean	2017	
"Congratulations (Chinese Version)"	Day6	Jae; Sungjin; Lim Jun-hyeok; Young K Wonpil; Dowoon	Hong Ji-sang; Lee Woo-min; Jae; Sungjin; Lim Jun-hyeok; Young K Wonpil; Dowoon	Hong Ji-sang; Lee Woo-min	Non-album single	Chinese	2017	
"Congratulations (English Version)"	Day6	Jae; Sungjin; Lim Jun-hyeok; Young K Wonpil; Dowoon	Hong Ji-sang; Lee Woo-min; Jae; Sungjin; Lim Jun-hyeok; Young K Wonpil; Dowoon	Hong Ji-sang; Lee Woo-min	The Best Day	English	2018	
"Counter"	Day6	Young K	Sungjin; Young K Wonpil; Hong Ji-sang	Hong Ji-sang	Band Aid	Korean	2024	
"Cover" (포장)	Day6	Sungjin; Young K	Sungjin; Young K Wonpil; Kevin Cho; Lee Min-kyung	Kevin Cho	The Book of Us: Gravity	Korean	2019	
"Covered in Love" (동화 속 아이처럼)	Sungjin		Ming Ji-syeon; Sungjin	Ming Ji-syeon	30	Korean	2024	

== D ==
Song	Artist(s)	Writer(s)			Album/Single	Language	Year	Ref.
Song	Artist(s)	Lyrics	Composition	Arrangement	Album/Single	Language	Year	Ref.
"Dance Dance"	Day6	Young K	Hong Ji-sang; Lee Woo-min; Jae; Sungjin; Young K Wonpil; Dowoon	Hong Ji-sang; Lee Woo-min	Every Day6 May	Korean	2017	
"Dance Dance"	Day6	Young K	Hong Ji-sang; Lee Woo-min; Jae; Sungjin; Young K Wonpil; Dowoon	Hong Ji-sang; Lee Woo-min	Sunrise	Korean	2017	
"Day and Night" (해와 달처럼)	Day6	Young K	Jae; Sungjin; Young K Wonpil; Hong Ji-sang	Hong Ji-sang	The Book of Us: The Demon	Korean	2020	
"days gone by" (행복했던 날들이었다)	Day6	Young K	Jae; Sungjin; Young K Wonpil; Hong Ji-sang	Hong Ji-sang	Remember Us: Youth Part 2	Korean	2018	
"Deep in love"	Day6	Young K	Jae; Sungjin; Young K Wonpil; Hong Ji-sang	Hong Ji-sang	The Book of Us: Entropy	Korean	2019	
"Did You Wake Up?" (일어났어?)	Hello Ga-Young; Wonpil	Hello Ga-Young		Jo Sung-tae	Non-album single	Korean	2020	
"Didn't Know" (그게 너의 사랑인지 몰랐어)	Day6	Sungjin; Young K Wonpil; Hong Ji-sang		Hong Ji-sang	Fourever	Korean	2024	
"Disco Day"	Day6	Young K Hong Ji-sang	Young K Wonpil; Hong Ji-sang	Hong Ji-sang	The Decade	Korean	2025	
"Dream Bus" (꿈의 버스)	Day6	Young K Hong Ji-sang	Sungjin; Young K Wonpil; Hong Ji-sang	Hong Ji-sang	The Decade	Korean	2025	
"Dream Rider" (날아라! 드림라이더)	Day6	Young K Wonpil; Hong Ji-sang		Hong Ji-sang	The Decade	Korean	2025	
"Dreamer" (꿈꾼)	Young K		Young K Hong Ji-sang	Hong Ji-sang	Letters with Notes	Korean	2023	
"Drivin' into Hell"	Young K		Young K Hong Ji-sang	Hong Ji-sang	YOUNGEST	Korean	2026	

== E ==
Song	Artist(s)	Writer(s)			Album/Single	Language	Year	Ref.
Song	Artist(s)	Lyrics	Composition	Arrangement	Album/Single	Language	Year	Ref.
"EASY"	Sungjin		Sungjin; Sim Hyun	Sim Hyun	30	Korean	2024	
"Emergency"	Day6	Jae; Sim Eun-jee; Lee Hae-sol		Sim Eun-jee; Lee Hae-sol	The Book of Us: Entropy	Korean	2019	
"Even if I’m dying (feat. Young K)"	paulkyte Young K	paulkyte Young K Grace Shin	paulkyte		Full Price Phobia	Korean	2025	
"Everybody Rock!"	Day6	Young K Co-sho	FRANTS; Young K	FRANTS	Unlock	Japanese	2018	
"everyday we fight"	Day6	Young K Wonpil	Jae; Hong Ji-sang	Hong Ji-sang	The Book of Us: Negentropy	Korean	2021	

== F ==
Song	Artist(s)	Writer(s)			Album/Single	Language	Year	Ref.
Song	Artist(s)	Lyrics	Composition	Arrangement	Album/Single	Language	Year	Ref.
"F world"	Young K		Young K Hong Ji-sang	Hong Ji-sang	YOUNGEST	Korean	2026	
"Falling"	Day6	Jae; Sungjin; Young K	Shinichi Ubukata; Jae; Sungjin; Young K Wonpil; Dowoon	Shinichi Ubukata	Unlock	Japanese	2018	
"Falling (Feat. Young K (DAY6))"	Woodz; Young K		Woodz; Young K Nathan; Hoho	Nathan; Hoho	Falling (Feat. Young K (DAY6))	Korean	2025	
"Feeling Good"	Day6	Young K	Hong Ji-sang; Jae; Sungjin; Young K Wonpil	Hong Ji-sang	Shoot Me: Youth Part 1	Korean	2018	
"Finale"	Day6	Young K KOMU	Sungjin; Young K Kevin G. Cho; Jeon Da-sol; Bae Jae-seok	Jeon Da-sol	The Best Day2	Japanese	2019	
"First Time"	Day6	Jae; Sungjin; Young K Wonpil; Dowoon	Hong Ji-sang; Lee Woo-min; Jae; Sungjin; Young K Wonpil; Dowoon	Hong Ji-sang; Lee Woo-min	Daydream	Korean	2016	
"For me"	Day6	Young K	Jae; Sungjin; Young K Wonpil; Hong Ji-sang	Hong Ji-sang	The Book of Us: Gravity	Korean	2019	
"Forest -Interlude 2- (with DENIMALZ 3)"	Day6 (Even of Day)	Young K	Hong Ji-sang		The Book of Us: Gluon	Korean	2020	
"Freely" (Free하게)	Day6	naru Jae; Sungjin; Lim Jun-hyeok; Young K Wonpil; Dowoon		naru	The Day	Korean	2015	
"Freely (Final Ver.)" (Free하게 (Final Ver.))	Day6	naru Jae; Sungjin; Lim Jun-hyeok; Young K Wonpil; Dowoon		naru	Moonrise	Korean	2017	
"From the Ending of a Tragedy" (비극의 결말에서)	Day6 (Even of Day)	Young K	Young K Wonpil; Hong Ji-sang	Hong Ji-sang	Right Through Me	Korean	2021	

== G ==
Song	Artist(s)	Writer(s)			Album/Single	Language	Year	Ref.
Song	Artist(s)	Lyrics	Composition	Arrangement	Album/Single	Language	Year	Ref.
"game over" (끝났지)	Day6	Young K	Young K Wonpil; Hong Ji-sang	Hong Ji-sang	Maybe Tomorrow	Korean	2025	
"Get The Hell Out" (널 제외한 나의 뇌)	Day6	Young K	Sungjin; Wonpil; Hong Ji-sang	Hong Ji-sang	Fourever	Korean	2024	
"Go Beyond"	Young K Wonpil	Juffie; All day on	Juffie; Bluepr!nt; All day on ALMA 22	Bluepr!nt; ALMA 22	Pokémon | Go Beyond	Korean	2025	
"Good Day 2025 (Telepathy + By the Moonlight Window)" (굿데이 2025 (텔레파시 + 달빛 창가에서))	Day6; Various Artist	Kim Chang-nam		Ido; Dominsuk	Good Day 2025 (Telepathy + By the Moonlight Window)	Korean	2025	
"Good-Bye Days"	Wonpil; Kei	Yui; Kim Han-sol	Yui; 1Division	Kim Nam-hun	Midnight Sun Part.2	Korean	2021	
"Goodbye, Love"	Young K		Young K GroovyRoom	GroovyRoom; Tomo Tc	YOUNGEST	Korean	2026	
"Goodbye Winter" (겨울이 간다)	Day6	Jae; Sungjin; Young K YUE; Cha Il-hoon		YUE; Cha Il-hoon; Yun Eun-suk	Every Day6 January	Korean	2017	
"Goodbye Winter" (겨울이 간다)	Day6	Jae; Sungjin; Young K YUE; Cha Il-hoon		YUE; Cha Il-hoon; Yun Eun-suk	Sunrise	Korean	2017	
"goodnight, dear" (잘 자라 내 사람아)	Young K		Young K	Jeog Jai	Eternal	Korean	2021	
"Guard You" (끝까지 안아 줄게)	Young K		Young K Hong Ji-sang	Hong Ji-sang	Eternal	Korean	2021	
"Gypsophila" (안개꽃)	Young K		Young K glowingdog	glowingdog	YOUNGEST	Korean	2026	

== H ==
Song	Artist(s)	Writer(s)			Album/Single	Language	Year	Ref.
Song	Artist(s)	Lyrics	Composition	Arrangement	Album/Single	Language	Year	Ref.
"Habits" (버릇이 됐어)	Day6	MR.CHO; Jae; Sungjin; Lim Jun-hyeok; Young K Wonpil; Dowoon	MR.CHO; Cheongdamdong Park Gun-woo; Jae; Sungjin; Lim Jun-hyeok; Young K Wonpil; Dowoon		The Day	Korean	2015	
"Habits (Final Ver.)" (버릇이 됐어 (Final Ver.))	Day6	MR.CHO; Jae; Sungjin; Lim Jun-hyeok; Young K Wonpil; Dowoon	MR.CHO; Cheongdamdong Park Gun-woo; Jae; Sungjin; Lim Jun-hyeok; Young K Wonpil; Dowoon		Moonrise	Korean	2017	
"Happy"	Day6	Young K	Sungjin; Wonpil; Hong Ji-sang	Hong Ji-sang	Fourever	Korean	2024	
"Headache" (두통)	Day6	Jae; Young K	Jae; Sungjin; Young K Wonpil; Hong Ji-sang	Hong Ji-sang	Remember Us: Youth Part 2	Korean	2018	
"Heading Home" (집으로 향한다)	Young K		Young K paulkyte	paulkyte	YOUNGEST	Korean	2026	
"Healer"	Day6	Young K	Jae; Young K Wonpil; Hong Ji-sang	Hong Ji-sang	The Book of Us: Negentropy	Korean	2021	
"Help Me Rock&Roll" (도와줘요 Rock&Roll)	Day6	Sungjin; Wonpil; Hong Ji-sang		Hong Ji-sang	Band Aid	Korean	2024	
"Hey" (있잖아)	Day6 (Even of Day)	Seo Ji-um	1601	Cha Il-hoon; Dowoon	Non-album single	Korean	2020	
"Hey Honey"	Young K		Pop Time; Daily; HAJU; Young K	Pop Time; Daily; HAJU	YOUNGEST	Korean	2026	
"Hi Hello"	Day6	Young K	Hong Ji-sang; Lee Woo-min; Jae; Sungjin; Young K Wonpil	Hong Ji-sang; Lee Woo-min	Every Day6 July	Korean	2017	
"Hi Hello"	Day6	Young K	Hong Ji-sang; Lee Woo-min; Jae; Sungjin; Young K Wonpil	Hong Ji-sang; Lee Woo-min	Moonrise	Korean	2017	
"Highs and Lows" (사랑병동)	Wonpil	Wonpil; Lee Woo-min		Lee Woo-min	Unpiltered	Korean	2026	
"Hold My Love" (백만송이는 아니지만)	Wonpil	Wonpil	Lee Woo-min; Wonpil	Lee Woo-min	Unpiltered	Korean	2026	
"Home Alone" (나 홀로 집에)	Day6 (Even of Day)	Wonpil	Young K Wonpil; Hong Ji-sang	Hong Ji-sang	Right Through Me	Korean	2021	
"How Can I Say" (어떻게 말해)	Day6	Young K Wonpil	Hong Ji-sang; Lee Woo-min; Jae; Sungjin; Young K Wonpil	Hong Ji-sang; Lee Woo-min	Every Day6 March	Korean	2017	
"How Can I Say" (어떻게 말해)	Day6	Young K Wonpil	Hong Ji-sang; Lee Woo-min; Jae; Sungjin; Young K Wonpil	Hong Ji-sang; Lee Woo-min	Sunrise	Korean	2017	
"How to love"	Day6	Young K	Jae; Sungjin; Young K Wonpil; Hong Ji-sang	Hong Ji-sang	The Book of Us: Gravity	Korean	2019	
"Hunt"	Day6	FRANTS; Young K Wonpil		FRANTS	Daydream	Korean	2016	
"Hurt Road" (아픈 길)	Day6	Young K	Jae; Sungjin; Young K Wonpil; Hong Ji-sang	Hong Ji-sang	Remember Us: Youth Part 2	Korean	2018	
"Hurt Road" (아픈 길)	Young K Kim Min-seok; Jung Nam-do; Yeom Woo-jin; Lim Jung-hyun; Kim Young-seok	Young K	Jae; Sungjin; Young K Wonpil; Hong Ji-sang	Koh Hyung-seok	King of Karaoke: VS EPISODE 1	Korean	2023	

== I ==
Song	Artist(s)	Writer(s)			Album/Single	Language	Year	Ref.
Song	Artist(s)	Lyrics	Composition	Arrangement	Album/Single	Language	Year	Ref.
"I don't wanna do anything" (아무것도 안 하고 싶다)	Sungjin	Sungjin	Sungjin; MooF	MooF	30	Korean	2024	
"I don't wanna lose"	Sungjin	Sungjin; Jeon Da-sol		Jeon Da-sol	30	Korean	2024	
"I Just"	Day6	Young K KOMU	Cha Il-hoon; Young K Wonpil	Cha Il-hoon; Wonpil	Unlock	Japanese	2018	
"I Like You" (좋아합니다)	Day6	Young K	Hong Ji-sang; Lee Woo-min; Jae; Sungjin; Young K Wonpil	Hong Ji-sang; Lee Woo-min	Moonrise	Korean	2017	
"I Loved You"	Day6	Young K	Hong Ji-sang; Lee Woo-min; Jae; Sungjin; Young K Wonpil	Hong Ji-sang; Lee Woo-min	Every Day6 September	Korean	2017	
"I Loved You"	Day6	Young K	Hong Ji-sang; Lee Woo-min; Jae; Sungjin; Young K Wonpil	Hong Ji-sang; Lee Woo-min	Moonrise	Korean	2017	
"I Need Somebody" (누군가 필요해)	Day6	Young K Kevin Cho	Kevin Cho; Young K Jae Dogi	Kevin Cho; Jae Dogi	Every Day6 October	Korean	2017	
"I Need Somebody" (누군가 필요해)	Day6	Young K Kevin Cho	Kevin Cho; Young K Jae Dogi	Kevin Cho; Jae Dogi	Moonrise	Korean	2017	
"I Smile" (반드시 웃는다)	Day6	Young K Wonpil	Hong Ji-sang; Lee Woo-min; Sungjin; Young K Wonpil	Hong Ji-sang; Lee Woo-min	Sunrise	Korean	2017	
"I Wait" (아 왜)	Day6	Young K	Hong Ji-sang; Lee Woo-min; Jae; Young K Wonpil	Hong Ji-sang; Lee Woo-min	Every Day6 January	Korean	2017	
"I Wait" (아 왜)	Day6	Young K	Hong Ji-sang; Lee Woo-min; Jae; Young K Wonpil	Hong Ji-sang; Lee Woo-min	Sunrise	Korean	2017	
"I Wait (Japanese Version)"	Day6	Young K	Hong Ji-sang; Lee Woo-min; Jae; Young K Wonpil	Hong Ji-sang; Lee Woo-min	The Best Day	Japanese	2018	
"I Would" (그럴 텐데)	Day6	Young K	Hong Ji-sang; Lee Woo-min; Jae; Young K Wonpil	Hong Ji-sang; Lee Woo-min	Every Day6 March	Korean	2017	
"I Would" (그럴 텐데)	Day6	Young K	Hong Ji-sang; Lee Woo-min; Jae; Young K Wonpil	Hong Ji-sang; Lee Woo-min	Sunrise	Korean	2017	
"If ~Mata Aetara~" (If ~また逢えたら~)	Day6	Young K KOMU	Cha Il-hoon; YUE; Sungjin; Young K Wonpil	Cha Il-hoon; YUE	Unlock	Japanese	2018	
"I'll Remember" (남겨둘게)	Day6	Young K	Hong Ji-sang; Lee Woo-min; Jae; Sungjin; Young K Wonpil	Hong Ji-sang; Lee Woo-min	Every Day6 September	Korean	2017	
"I'll Remember" (남겨둘게)	Day6	Young K	Hong Ji-sang; Lee Woo-min; Jae; Sungjin; Young K Wonpil	Hong Ji-sang; Lee Woo-min	Moonrise	Korean	2017	
"I'll Try" (노력해볼게요)	Day6	Kevin Cho; Wonpil	Kevin Cho; Wonpil; Lee Min-kyung	Kevin Cho; Lee Min-kyung	Moonrise	Korean	2017	
"I'm Fine"	Day6	Sungjin; Young K Wonpil; Hong Ji-sang		Hong Ji-sang	Band Aid	Korean	2024	
"I'm Serious" (장난 아닌데)	Day6	Sungjin; Young K Wonpil	Hong Ji-sang; Lee Woo-min; Sungjin; Wonpil	Hong Ji-sang; Lee Woo-min	Every Day6 April	Korean	2017	
"I'm Serious" (장난 아닌데)	Day6	Sungjin; Young K Wonpil	Hong Ji-sang; Lee Woo-min; Sungjin; Wonpil	Hong Ji-sang; Lee Woo-min	Sunrise	Korean	2017	
"INSIDE OUT"	Day6	Young K	Sungjin; Young K Wonpil; Hong Ji-sang	Hong Ji-sang	The Decade	Korean	2025	
"Insomnia" (불면증)	Young K		Park Ddol-i; Peter Pan	Hwang Hyun-sung	Let Me Off the Earth OST	Korean	2020	
"Insomnia Future Bass Remix" (불면증 Future Bass Remix)	Young K		Park Ddol-i; Peter Pan	Waveshower	Let Me Off the Earth OST	Korean	2020	
"It Just Happened (feat. Young K (DAY6))" (그렇게 됐어 (feat. Young K (DAY6)))	Cheeze; Young K	Cheeze; Brother Su d.ear		Brother Su d.ear	It Just Happened	Korean	2025	

== K ==
Song	Artist(s)	Writer(s)			Album/Single	Language	Year	Ref.
Song	Artist(s)	Lyrics	Composition	Arrangement	Album/Single	Language	Year	Ref.
"Kiminara" (君なら)	Day6	Young K	Cha Il-hoon; YUE; Jeon Woo-seok; Young K Wonpil	Cha Il-hoon; YUE	The Best Day2	Japanese	2019	

== L ==
Song	Artist(s)	Writer(s)			Album/Single	Language	Year	Ref.
Song	Artist(s)	Lyrics	Composition	Arrangement	Album/Single	Language	Year	Ref.
"Landed" (그렇게 너에게 도착하였다)	Day6 (Even of Day)	Young K	Young K Wonpil; Hong Ji-sang	Hong Ji-sang	The Book of Us: Gluon	Korean	2020	
"Landing -Intro- (with DENIMALZ 3)"	Day6 (Even of Day)	Young K	Hong Ji-sang		The Book of Us: Gluon	Korean	2020	
"Last Goodbye" (늦은 끝)	Wonpil		Ming Ji-syeon; Wonpil	Ming Ji-syeon	Pilmography	Korean	2022	
"Lean On Me" (오늘은 내게)	Day6	Sungjin; Young K Wonpil	Hong Ji-sang; Lee Woo-min; Swanthewhitepig; Jae; Sungjin; Young K Wonpil	Hong Ji-sang; Lee Woo-min; Swanthewhitepig	Sunrise	Korean	2017	
"Leaves (Feat. Young K)"	Ben&Ben; Young K	Paolo Benjamin G.Guico	—N/a		Non-album single	English	2021	
"let it be summer"	Young K	Young K	Young K Hong Ji-sang	Hong Ji-sang	Letters with Notes	Korean	2023	
"Let Me Love You" (사랑하게 해주라)	Day6	Young K	Sungjin; Wonpil; Hong Ji-sang	Hong Ji-sang	Fourever	Korean	2024	
"Letting Go" (놓아 놓아 놓아)	Day6	Young K Wonpil	Hong Ji-sang; Lee Woo-min; Young K Wonpil	Hong Ji-sang; Lee Woo-min	Daydream	Korean	2016	
"Letting Go (Rebooted Ver.)" (놓아 놓아 놓아 (Rebooted Ver.))	Day6	Young K Wonpil	Hong Ji-sang; Lee Woo-min; Young K Wonpil	Hong Ji-sang; Lee Woo-min	Sunrise	Korean	2017	
"Like A Fire"	Wonpil	Kim Ho-kyung; Park Tae-hyun	1601		Best Mistake OST	Korean	2022	
"Like That Sun" (태양처럼)	Day6	FRANTS; Jae; Sungjin; Lim Jun-hyeok; Young K Wonpil; Dowoon		FRANTS	The Day	Korean	2015	
"Like That Sun (Final Ver.)" (태양처럼 (Final Ver.))	Day6	FRANTS; Jae; Sungjin; Lim Jun-hyeok; Young K Wonpil; Dowoon		FRANTS	Moonrise	Korean	2017	
"Like a Flowing Wind" (마치 흘러가는 바람처럼)	Day6	Young K Wonpil	Wonpil; Kim Yeon-seo; Ming Ji-syeon	Ming Ji-syeon	The Book of Us: Entropy	Korean	2019	
"Live Your Life"	Day6	Young K	Cha Il-hoon; Young K	Cha Il-hoon; REX; Young K	Unlock	Japanese	2018	
"Love (with Young K of Day6)"	X Lovers; Young K	London Jackson; Jacob Ames		—N/a	Non-album single	Korean	2020	
"Love me or Leave me"	Day6	Young K	Jae; Sungjin; Young K Wonpil; Hong Ji-sang	Hong Ji-sang	The Book of Us: The Demon	Korean	2020	
"Love Parade"	Day6 (Even of Day)	Young K Wonpil	Young K Wonpil; Hong Ji-sang	Hong Ji-sang	Right Through Me	Korean	2021	
"Love Song" (사랑노래)	The Blank Shop; Wonpil	Yun Seok-cheol			Tailor	Korean	2020	
"Love will find a way" (나무가 될게)	Young K	Heo Sung-jin; Son Jeong-hyeok	Heo Sung-jin; Dunk; MLC	Heo Sung-jin; Dunk	Good Boy OST	Korean	2025	
"Loveholic"	Day6	Lee Jae-hak		Cha Il-hoon; Dowoon	Psycho, Loveholic [THE SEASONS: Red Carpet with Lee Hyo Ri]	Korean	2024	
"Lovely Girl"	5Live	Jung Eugene; Shim Jae-hee	Kim Hyung-suk	Yun Woo-suk; Lee Dae-hee	Bel Ami OST	Korean	2013	
"Lovin' the Christmas"	Day6	Young K	Sungjin; Young K Wonpil; Hong Ji-sang	Hong Ji-sang	Lovin' the Christmas	Korean	2025	

== M ==
Song	Artist(s)	Writer(s)			Album/Single	Language	Year	Ref.
Song	Artist(s)	Lyrics	Composition	Arrangement	Album/Single	Language	Year	Ref.
"Man in a movie"	Day6	Young K	Hong Ji-sang; Sungjin; Young K Wonpil	Hong Ji-sang	Every Day6 May	Korean	2017	
"Man in a movie"	Day6	Young K	Hong Ji-sang; Sungjin; Young K Wonpil	Hong Ji-sang	Sunrise	Korean	2017	
"Maplelatte" (메이플라떼)	Day6 (Even of Day)	Noah; E.NA	Ji-hye; Clyde	—N/a	Dear.M (Original Soundtrack) Part.1	Korean	2025	
"Marathon" (마라톤)	Day6	Young K Kevin Cho	Young K Wonpil; Kevin Cho	Kevin Cho	Remember Us: Youth Part 2	Korean	2018	
"Marionette"	Young K		Lee Woo-min; Young K	Lee Woo-min	YOUNGEST	Korean	2026	
"Maybe Next Time (feat. Young K)"	Jamie Miller; Young K	Jamie Miller; Adam Yaron; Caleb Shapiro	Jamie Miller; Adam Yaron; Caleb Shapiro; Moira Dela Torre	—N/a	Non-album single	English	2023	
"Maybe Tomorrow"	Day6	Young K	Sungjin; Young K Wonpil; Hong Ji-sang	Hong Ji-sang	Maybe Tomorrow	Korean	2025	
"Meet Me When The Sun Goes Down" (태양이 지면 널 만나러 갈게)	Wonpil	Kim Han-sol	Han Bo-ram	1Division; Kim Nam-hun	Midnight Sun Part.2	Korean	2021	
"Melt Down" (녹아내려요)	Day6	Young K	Sungjin; Young K Wonpil; Hong Ji-sang	Hong Ji-sang	Band Aid	Korean	2024	
"Memories"	Sungjin		Sungjin; Sim Hyun; Oh Ji-hyun	Sim Hyun; Oh Ji-hyun	30	Korean	2024	
"Microphone (Feat. Dvwn)"	Young K Dvwn		Young K HotSauce	HotSauce	Eternal	Korean	2021	
"million reasons"	Young K		Young K kohu	kohu	YOUNGEST	Korean	2026	
"Monster" (괴물)	Day6	Young K	Sungjin; Young K Wonpil; Dowoon; Hong Ji-sang	Hong Ji-sang	Band Aid	Korean	2024	
"My Day"	Day6	Young K	Cho Gae-hyuk; Ju Hyo; Young K Wonpil	Cho Gae-hyuk; Ju Hyo; Young K Wonpil; Dowoon	Every Day6 February	Korean	2017	
"My Day"	Day6	Young K	Cho Gae-hyuk; Ju Hyo; Young K Wonpil	Cho Gae-hyuk; Ju Hyo; Young K Wonpil; Dowoon	Sunrise	Korean	2017	
"My Way"	Day6	Young K	Young K Wonpil; Hong Ji-sang	Hong Ji-sang	The Decade	Korean	2025	

== N ==
Song	Artist(s)	Writer(s)			Album/Single	Language	Year	Ref.
Song	Artist(s)	Lyrics	Composition	Arrangement	Album/Single	Language	Year	Ref.
"naps!"	1415; Wonpil	Oh Ji-hyun	Joo Seoung-geun; Oh Ji-hyun; Sim Hyun	Joo Seoung-geun; Oh Ji-hyun	naps!	Korean	2021	
"natural"	Young K		Young K U-lu; Nomasgood; 8Hoop	U-lu; Nomasgood; 8Hoop	Letters with Notes	Korean	2023	
"Nobody Knows"	Day6	Sungjin; Young K Wonpil; FRANTS; KOMU	FRANTS; Sungjin; Young K Wonpil	FRANTS	Unlock	Japanese	2018	
"Not Fine" (나빠)	Day6	Young K	Jae; Sungjin; Young K Wonpil; Hong Ji-sang	Hong Ji-sang	The Book of Us: Entropy	Korean	2019	
"not gonna love" (사랑은 얼어 죽을)	Young K		Young K Hong Ji-sang	Hong Ji-sang	Eternal	Korean	2021	
"Not Mine"	Day6	Wonpil; Jeon Da-sol; Jae Dogi		Jeon Da-sol	The Book of Us: Entropy	Korean	2019	
"nothing but" (이것밖에는 없다)	Young K	Young K Hong Ji-sang		Hong Ji-sang	Letters with Notes	Korean	2023	
"Nowhere You Are" (어디에도 없는 널)	Sungjin	Sungjin; D'tour	Sungjin; Aaron Kim; HAHM; BYDOR ARCHIVE wez Isaac Han	HAHM; BYDOR ARCHIVE; Aaron Kim	30	Korean	2024	

== O ==
Song	Artist(s)	Writer(s)			Album/Single	Language	Year	Ref.
Song	Artist(s)	Lyrics	Composition	Arrangement	Album/Single	Language	Year	Ref.
"Ocean -Interlude 1- (with DENIMALZ 3)"	Day6 (Even of Day)	Young K	Young K Hong Ji-sang	Hong Ji-sang	The Book of Us: Gluon	Korean	2020	
"On Rainy Days" (비가 오는 날엔)	Wonpil; Yang Yo-seob; Son Dong-woon	Choi Kyu-sung; Yong Jun-hyung	Choi Kyu-sung	—N/a	Non-album single	Korean	2022	
"One" (무적)	Day6	Young K Wonpil	Jae; Young K Wonpil; Hong Ji-sang	Hong Ji-sang	The Book of Us: Negentropy	Korean	2021	
"Only" (둘도 아닌 하나)	Day6	Young K	Jae; Sungjin; Young K Wonpil; Hong Ji-sang	Hong Ji-sang	The Book of Us: Negentropy	Korean	2021	
"Ordinary Days" (작업실에서 커피를)	Young K	Young K Sunwoo Jung-a		Sunwoo Jung-a; Kwak Eun-jeong	YOUNGEST	Korean	2026	
"Ouch" (아야야)	Day6	Young K	Young K KIME; Munan; Sean M. Sinclair; Cho Chang-hyun	KIME; Munan; Sean M. Sinclair; Cho Chang-hyun	The Book of Us: Entropy	Korean	2019	
"Our Season" (우리의 계절)	Day6	Young K	Young K Wonpil; Hong Ji-sang	Hong Ji-sang	The Decade	Korean	2025	
"Out of My Mind" (이상하게 계속 이래)	Day6	Jae; Sungjin; Lim Jun-hyeok; Young K Wonpil; Dowoon	Andrew Choi; 220; Jae; Sungjin; Lim Jun-hyeok; Young K Wonpil; Dowoon	220	The Day	Korean	2015	
"Out of My Mind (Final Ver.)" (이상하게 계속 이래(Final Ver.))	Day6	Jae; Sungjin; Lim Jun-hyeok; Young K Wonpil; Dowoon	Andrew Choi; 220; Jae; Sungjin; Lim Jun-hyeok; Young K Wonpil; Dowoon	220	Moonrise	Korean	2017	
"Out of The Blue (Duet with Song Heejin)" (문득 (Duet with 송희진))	Dowoon	Dowoon; Song Hee-jin	Dowoon; Song Hee-jin; Kevin Cho; Cha Il-hoon; YUE	Kevin Cho	Out of The Blue	Korean	2021	

== P ==
Song	Artist(s)	Writer(s)			Album/Single	Language	Year	Ref.
Song	Artist(s)	Lyrics	Composition	Arrangement	Album/Single	Language	Year	Ref.
"Piano" (피아노)	Wonpil		Ming Ji-syeon; Wonpil	Ming Ji-syeon	Unpiltered	Korean	2026	
"Pieces" (휴지조각)	Wonpil	Wonpil; Kevin Cho		Kevin Cho	Pilmography	Korean	2022	
"playground"	Young K		Young K Humbert paulkyte	Humbert	Letters with Notes	Korean	2023	
"Pouring" (쏟아진다)	Day6	Young K	Hong Ji-sang; Lee Woo-min; Jae; Sungjin; Young K Wonpil	Hong Ji-sang; Lee Woo-min	Every Day6 Movember	Korean	2017	
"Pouring" (쏟아진다)	Day6	Young K	Hong Ji-sang; Lee Woo-min; Jae; Sungjin; Young K Wonpil	Hong Ji-sang; Lee Woo-min	Moonrise	Korean	2017	

== R ==
Song	Artist(s)	Writer(s)			Album/Single	Language	Year	Ref.
Song	Artist(s)	Lyrics	Composition	Arrangement	Album/Single	Language	Year	Ref.
"Rescue Me"	Day6	Young K Wonpil	Jae; Wonpil; FRANTS	FRANTS	The Book of Us: Entropy	Korean	2019	
"Right Through Me" (뚫고 지나가요)	Day6 (Even of Day)	Young K	Young K Wonpil; Hong Ji-sang	Hong Ji-sang	Right Through Me	Korean	2021	
"Round of Applause" (환호)	Kim Young-seok; Young K	Young K	Na Sang-hyun; Young K		King of Karaoke: VS SEMI FINAL	Korean	2023	

== S ==
Song	Artist(s)	Writer(s)			Album/Single	Language	Year	Ref.
Song	Artist(s)	Lyrics	Composition	Arrangement	Album/Single	Language	Year	Ref.
"Sad Ending" (나만 슬픈 엔딩)	Day6	Sungjin; Young K Wonpil; Hong Ji-sang	Sungjin; Wonpil; Hong Ji-sang	Hong Ji-sang	Fourever	Korean	2024	
"Say Hello"	Day6	Young K Watanabe Hajime	220; Jae; Sungjin; Young K Wonpil	220	Unlock	Japanese	2018	
"Say Wow"	Day6	Young K	Hong Ji-sang; Young K Wonpil	Hong Ji-sang	Every Day6 April	Korean	2017	
"Say Wow"	Day6	Young K	Hong Ji-sang; Young K Wonpil	Hong Ji-sang	Sunrise	Korean	2017	
"Season of Us" (다시 돌아온 계절)	Young K	Lee Chi-hun	Park Sung-il	Uncle Sam	My Royal Nemesis OST Part.2	Korean	2026	
"Seventeen (with Wonpil (Day6))" (열일곱 (with 원필 (Day6)))	Jinyoung; Wonpil		Chaz Jackson; Romello Rozier; AJ Melvin	Chaz Jackson	Said & Done	Korean	2026	
"She Smiled" (그녀가 웃었다)	Day6	Sungjin; Wonpil; Hong Ji-sang	Sungjin; Young K Wonpil; Hong Ji-sang	Hong ji-sang	Band Aid	Korean	2024	
"Shoot Me"	Day6	Young K	Hong Ji-sang; Lee Woo-min; Jae; Sungjin; Young K Wonpil	Hong Ji-sang; Lee Woo-min	Shoot Me: Youth Part 1	Korean	2018	
"Shouldn't Have (Feat. Young K)" (이럴거면 그러지말지 (Feat. Young K))	Baek A-yeon; Young K	Sim Eun-jee; Baek A-yeon; Young K	Sim Eun-jee; Baek A-yeon	Sim Eun-jee	Non-album single	Korean	2015	
"Shut The Door"	Young K	Young K	Lee Woo-min; Young K	Lee Woo-min	YOUNGEST	Korean	2026	
"Shxtty Game" (망겜)	Day6	Young K	Sungjin; Young K Wonpil; Hong Ji-sang	Hong Ji-sang	Band Aid	Korean	2024	
"Sincerity" (지우게)	Wonpil	Young K Wonpil	Wonpil; Hong Ji-sang	Hong Ji-sang	Pilmography	Korean	2022	
"Sing Me"	Day6	Young K Wonpil	Nuplay; Neil Nallas; Walter Pok; Jae; Sungjin; Young K Wonpil; Dowoon	Nuplay	Daydream	Korean	2016	
"Sky High (Feat. Young K)"	Park Sae-byul; Like, Likes; Young K	Park Sae-byul; Young K	Park Sae-byul; Choi Seok; Toyo Lee	Choi Seok; Toyo Lee	Non-album single	Korean	2015	
"Slightly Tipsy" (취기를 빌려)	Wonpil	Sae Bom		—N/a	Non-album single	Korean	2022	
"Slow (Feat. Young K)"	Big Ocean; Young K	Seo Ju-won		Seo Ju-won; Bae Joon-sung	Non-album single	Korean	2024	
"So Cool" (완전 멋지잖아)	Day6	Young K	Jae; Sungjin; Young K Wonpil; Hong Ji-sang	Hong Ji-sang	Remember Us: Youth Part 2	Korean	2018	
"So It's The End" (드디어 끝나갑니다)	Day6	Young K	Sungjin; Young K Wonpil; Hong Ji-sang	Hong Ji-sang	The Decade	Korean	2025	
"So Let's Love" (우리 앞으로 더 사랑하자)	Day6	Jae; Young K ARTISEAN	Jae; Young K atomik KIME	atomik KIME	The Book of Us: Negentropy	Korean	2021	
"So Nice (GMF2023 Ver.)"	Young K 9.10000; Lim Kim; Na Sang-hyun; Ryu Ji-ho; Shin On-yu	Lee Won-suk	Kim Jang-won; Kim Sun-il	Kwon Hyuk-ho; Jeong Dong-hwan	Non-album single	Korean	2023	
"so this is love" (사랑, 이게 맞나 봐)	Day6 (Even of Day)	Young K	Young K Wonpil; Hong Ji-sang	Hong Ji-sang	Non-album single	Korean	2021	
"Someday, Spring Will Come" (언젠가 봄은 찾아올 거야)	Wonpil		Yun Seok-cheol		Pilmography	Korean	2022	
"Somehow" (어쩌다 보니)	Day6	Young K	Hong Ji-sang; Lee Woo-min; Jae; Sungjin; Young K Wonpil	Hong Ji-sang; Lee Woo-min	Shoot Me: Youth Part 1	Korean	2018	
"song for you" (노래로)	Lim Jung-hyun; Young K	Young K	Park Mun-chi; Young K	Park Mun-chi	King of Karaoke: VS FINAL	Korean	2023	
"Soul (Feat. CHOILB)"	Young K CHOILB		Young K Sim Hyun	Sim Hyun	Letters with Notes	Korean	2023	
"SPIKE"	Young K	Young K Ollounder		Ollounder	YOUNGEST	Korean	2026	
"Step by Step"	Wonpil		Lee Woo-min; Wonpil	Lee Woo-min	Unpiltered	Korean	2026	
"Still" (원하니까)	Day6	Young K	Hong Ji-sang; Lee Woo-min; Jae; Sungjin; Young K Wonpil; Dowoon	Hong Ji-sang; Lee Woo-min	Shoot Me: Youth Part 1	Korean	2018	
"Still There" (아직 거기 살아)	Day6	Young K	Sungjin; Young K Wonpil; Hong Ji-sang	Hong Ji-sang	Band Aid	Korean	2024	
"Stop" (때려쳐)	Day6	Young K	Jae; Sungjin; Young K Wonpil; Hong Ji-sang	Hong Ji-sang	The Book of Us: The Demon	Korean	2020	
"Stop Talking" (막말)	Day6	Young K	Jae; Young K 203; Swavey Child	203	The Book of Us: Entropy	Korean	2019	
"Stop The Rain"	Day6	Jae; Sungjin; Young K	Shinichi Ubukata; Jae; Sungjin; Young K Wonpil; Dowoon	Shinichi Ubukata	Unlock	Japanese	2018	
"Stranded" (외딴섬의 외톨이)	Wonpil	Young K Wonpil	Wonpil; Hong Ji-sang	Hong Ji-sang	Pilmography	Korean	2022	
"Strange"	Young K		Park Mun-chi; Young K	Park Mun-chi	Letters with Notes	Korean	2023	
"Sugar High [feat. Young K]" (ใจอ้วน [feat. Young K])	Stamp; Young K		Stamp	Pokpong Jitdee	Non-album single	Thai; Korean	2021	
"Sun, Stay Asleep" (해야 뜨지 말아 줘)	Day6	Young K	Sungjin; Young K Wonpil; Hong Ji-sang	Hong Ji-sang	The Decade	Korean	2025	
"Sunny Day (Feat. Young K (DAY6))"	Haha; Young K	Young K Haha; Na Do-jin	Young K Haha; A36	A36	Mapo Sheriff	Korean	2025	
"Sweet Chaos"	Day6	Young K	Jae; Sungjin; Young K Wonpil; Hong Ji-sang	Hong Ji-sang	The Book of Us: Entropy	Korean	2019	
"Sweet Chaos (Japanese Version)"	Day6	Young K KOMU	Jae; Sungjin; Young K Wonpil; Hong Ji-sang	Hong Ji-sang	The Best Day2	Japanese	2019	

== T ==
Song	Artist(s)	Writer(s)			Album/Single	Language	Year	Ref.
Song	Artist(s)	Lyrics	Composition	Arrangement	Album/Single	Language	Year	Ref.
"Take All My Heart"	Day6	Young K Wonpil; Hong Ji-sang	Sungjin; Young K Wonpil; Hong Ji-sang	Hong Ji-sang	The Decade	Korean	2025	
"Talking To" (혼잣말)	Day6	Jae; Young K	Hong Ji-sang; Jae; Young K Wonpil	Hong Ji-sang	Shoot Me: Youth Part 1	Korean	2018	
"Thank You Song" (땡큐송)	Day6; SSaW and Friends	Kim Jong-jin		Kim Jong-jin; Kim Jung-woo	The Way You Keep Friendship, Vol. 1	Korean	2018	
"Thanks To" (땡스 투)	Day6 (Even of Day)	Young K Wonpil	Young K Wonpil; Hong Ji-sang	Hong Ji-sang	The Book of Us: Gluon	Korean	2020	
"The Power of Love"	Day6	Young K	Sungjin; Young K Wonpil; Hong Ji-sang	Hong Ji-sang	Fourever	Korean	2024	
"Tick Tock"	Day6	Jae; Young K	Jae; Sungjin; Young K Wonpil; Hong Ji-sang	Hong Ji-sang	The Book of Us: The Demon	Korean	2020	
"Time of Our Life" (한 페이지가 될 수 있게)	Day6	Young K	Jae; Sungjin; Young K Wonpil; Hong Ji-sang	Hong Ji-sang	The Book of Us: Gravity	Korean	2019	
"Time of Our Life (Japanese Version)"	Day6	Young K Co-sho	Jae; Sungjin; Young K Wonpil; Hong Ji-sang	Hong Ji-sang	The Best Day2	Japanese	2019	
"To be continued -Outro- (Sung by DENIMALZ 3)"	Day6 (Even of Day)	Young K	Young K Wonpil; Hong Ji-sang	Hong Ji-sang	The Book of Us: Gluon	Korean	2020	
"Toxic Love"	Wonpil		Park Woo-sang; Wonpil	Park Woo-sang	Unpiltered	Korean	2026	

== U ==
Song	Artist(s)	Writer(s)			Album/Single	Language	Year	Ref.
Song	Artist(s)	Lyrics	Composition	Arrangement	Album/Single	Language	Year	Ref.
"Unpainted Canvas" (그리다 보면)	Wonpil	Young K Wonpil	Wonpil; Sim Hyun; Oh Ji-hyun	Sim Hyun; Oh Ji-hyun	Pilmography	Korean	2022	
"Up All Night"	Wonpil		Park Woo-sang; Wonpil; TAEY	Park Woo-sang; TAEY	Unpiltered	Korean	2026	

== V ==
Song	Artist(s)	Writer(s)			Album/Single	Language	Year	Ref.
Song	Artist(s)	Lyrics	Composition	Arrangement	Album/Single	Language	Year	Ref.
"Voiceless" (안녕, 잘 가)	Wonpil	Young K Wonpil	Wonpil; Hong Ji-sang	Hong Ji-sang	Pilmography	Korean	2022	

== W ==
Song	Artist(s)	Writer(s)			Album/Single	Language	Year	Ref.
Song	Artist(s)	Lyrics	Composition	Arrangement	Album/Single	Language	Year	Ref.
"waited" (오늘만을 너만을 이날을)	Young K		Young K Hong Ji-sang	Hong Ji-sang	Letters with Notes	Korean	2023	
"Walk" (역대급)	Day6 (Even of Day)	Young K	Young K Wonpil; Hong Ji-sang	Hong Ji-sang	Right Through Me	Korean	2021	
"Walk With Me" (우리 더 걸을까)	Wonpil		Sim Hyun		Pilmography	Korean	2022	
"Wanna Go Back" (돌아갈래요)	Day6	Young K	Jae; Young K 220	220	The Book of Us: Gravity	Korean	2019	
"want to love you"	Young K	Young K	Young K Jeon Da-sol	Jeon Da-sol	Eternal	Korean	2021	
"Warning!"	Day6	Young K	Hong Ji-sang; Jae; Sungjin; Young K Wonpil	Hong Ji-sang	Shoot Me: Youth Part 1	Korean	2018	
"We" (우린)	Day6 (Even of Day)	Young K	Young K Wonpil; Hong Ji-sang	Hong Ji-sang	Right Through Me	Korean	2021	
"Wedding Song" (축가)	J_ust; Wonpil	J_ust	J_ust; Jeong Su-min		Non-album single	Korean	2020	
"Wednesday Night"	Sungjin	Sungjin; D'tour	Sungjin; Aaron Kim; D'tour; Isaac Han	Aaron Kim	30	Korean	2024	
"Welcome to the Show"	Day6	Young K	Sungjin; Young K Wonpil; Hong Ji-sang	Hong Ji-sang	Fourever	Korean	2024	
"What a Wonderful Word"	Park Mun-chi; Young K	Dvwn; Park Mun-chi; Young K		Park Mun-chi	Non-album single	Korean	2021	
"What Are You Doing Now?" (너는 지금쯤)	Day6; Cha Il-hoon	Kim Jong-jin		Cha Il-hoon	The Way You Keep Friendship: SSaW Tribute, Vol. 4	Korean	2018	
"What Can I Do" (좋은걸 뭐 어떡해)	Day6	Young K	Hong Ji-sang; Lee Woo-min; Jae; Sungjin; Young K Wonpil	Hong Ji-sang; Lee Woo-min	Every Day6 August	Korean	2017	
"What Can I Do" (좋은걸 뭐 어떡해)	Day6	Young K	Hong Ji-sang; Lee Woo-min; Jae; Sungjin; Young K Wonpil	Hong Ji-sang; Lee Woo-min	Moonrise	Korean	2017	
"what is.."	Young K	Young K	Young K Jeon Da-sol; MOGT	Jeon Da-sol; MOGT	Letters with Notes	Korean	2023	
"whatever"	Young K	Young K	Young K glowingdog	glowingdog	YOUNGEST	Korean	2026	
"Whatever!" (놀래!)	Day6	Young K	Hong Ji-sang; Lee Woo-min; Jae; Sungjin; Young K Wonpil	Hong Ji-sang; Lee Woo-min	Every Day6 August	Korean	2017	
"Whatever!" (놀래!)	Day6	Young K	Hong Ji-sang; Lee Woo-min; Jae; Sungjin; Young K Wonpil	Hong Ji-sang; Lee Woo-min	Moonrise	Korean	2017	
"When You Love Someone" (그렇더라고요)	Day6	Young K	Hong Ji-sang; Lee Woo-min; Jae; Sungjin; Young K Wonpil	Hong Ji-sang; Lee Woo-min	Every Day6 October	Korean	2017	
"When You Love Someone" (그렇더라고요)	Day6	Young K	Hong Ji-sang; Lee Woo-min; Jae; Sungjin; Young K Wonpil	Hong Ji-sang; Lee Woo-min	Moonrise	Korean	2017	
"Where The Sea Sleeps" (파도가 끝나는 곳까지)	Day6 (Even of Day)	Young K	Young K Hong Ji-sang	Hong Ji-sang	The Book of Us: Gluon	Korean	2020	
"Wish" (바래)	Day6	FRANTS; Sungjin; Young K Wonpil		FRANTS	Daydream	Korean	2016	
"Wish"	Wonpil	Kim A-hyun	MCK (ARTiffect); Etham; Chris Wahle; Hautboi Rich	MCK (ARTiffect)	Wish	Korean	2026	
"With You"	Young K	Park Seul-gi; Leafie	Park Seul-gi; Sun Jin-hyeok +1	Park Seul-gi; Sun Jin-hyeok	Non-album single	Korean	2023	

== Y ==
Song	Artist(s)	Writer(s)			Album/Single	Language	Year	Ref.
Song	Artist(s)	Lyrics	Composition	Arrangement	Album/Single	Language	Year	Ref.
"Yonge St."	Young K		Young K paulkyte	paulkyte	YOUNGEST	Korean	2026	
"You Have A Crush on Me" (넌 내게 반했어)	No Brain; Sungjin; Dowoon	Lee Sung-woo	Vovo; Hwang Hyun-seong; Lee Sung-woo; Jeong Woo-yong	Cha Il-hoon; Hwang Hyun-seong	No Brain 30th Anniversary Part.5	Korean	2026	
"You make Me"	Day6	Young K	Young K Wonpil; Hong Ji-sang	Hong Ji-sang	The Book of Us: Negentropy	Korean	2021	
"You Wake Me Up"	Sungjin		Ming Ji-syeon; Sungjin	Ming Ji-syeon	30	Korean	2024	
"You Were Beautiful" (예뻤어)	Day6	Young K	Hong Ji-sang; Lee Woo-min; Young K Wonpil	Hong Ji-sang; Lee Woo-min	Every Day6 February	Korean	2017	
"You Were Beautiful" (예뻤어)	Day6	Young K	Hong Ji-sang; Lee Woo-min; Young K Wonpil	Hong Ji-sang; Lee Woo-min	Sunrise	Korean	2017	
"You Were Beautiful (English Version)"	Day6	Young K	Hong Ji-sang; Lee Woo-min; Young K Wonpil	Hong Ji-sang; Lee Woo-min	The Best Day	English	2018	
"You Were Beautiful" (예뻤어)	Wonpil	Young K	Hong Ji-sang; Lee Woo-min; Young K Wonpil	—N/a	Non-album single	Korean	2022	

== Z ==
Song	Artist(s)	Writer(s)			Album/Single	Language	Year	Ref.
Song	Artist(s)	Lyrics	Composition	Arrangement	Album/Single	Language	Year	Ref.
Zombie	Day6	Young K Wonpil	Jae; Hong Ji-sang	Hong Ji-sang	The Book of Us: The Demon	Korean	2020	
Zombie (English Ver.)	Day6	Young K Wonpil	Jae; Hong Ji-sang	Hong Ji-sang	The Book of Us: The Demon	English	2020	
