= Sweet Chaos =

Single by Day6

from the EP The Book of Us: Entropy
- Language: Korean
- Released: October 22, 2019
- Length: 3:47
- Label: JYP
- Composers: Young K; Jae; Sungjin; Wonpil; Hong Ji-sang
- Lyricist: Young K

Day6 singles chronology
"Time of Our Life" (2019)	"Sweet Chaos" (2019)	"Zombie" (2020)

Music video
- "Sweet Chaos" on YouTube

"Sweet Chaos" is a song recorded by South Korean boy band Day6 for their third studio album The Book of Us: Entropy. It was released as the album's lead single by JYP Entertainment on October 22, 2019.

== Background and release ==
On September 28, 2019, it was reported that Day6 would be returning with new music in October after fans discovered an advertisement at a subway station depicting Day6's logo with the date October 22 and the time 6 pm. Day6's agency JYP Entertainment later confirmed, "it is true that Day6 will come back on October 22". The first music video teaser for "Sweet Chaos" was released on October 20 and an album sampler was revealed the following day.

== Composition ==
"Sweet Chaos" Is written by Young K and composed by Young K, Jae, Sungjin, Wonpil and Hong Ji-sang. The song is composed in the key B Minor and has 100 beats per minute and a running time of 3 minutes and 47 seconds. "Sweet Chaos" has been described as a swing number that combines groove with punk rock.

== Promotion ==
Day6 held their first comeback stage for "Sweet Chaos" on Mnet M Countdown on October 24. Day6 also performed on two other music programs in the first week of promotion: Music Bank on October 25 and Show! Music Core, on October 26.

== Publication lists ==
Publication lists for "Sweet Chaos"
Critic/Publication	List	Rank	Ref.
Refinery29	The Best K-Pop Songs Of 2019	2	

== Charts ==
Weekly chart performance for "Sweet Chaos"
Chart (2019)	Peak position
South Korea (Gaon)	114
South Korea (K-pop Hot 100)	69

== Release history ==
Release history
Region	Date	Format	Label
Various	October 22, 2019	Digital download; streaming	JYP
