= Studio J =

South Korean record label

- Type: Private
- Industry: Music
- Genre: K-pop
- Founded: January 18, 2015; 11 years ago
- Founder: J. Y. Park
- Headquarters: Seoul, South Korea
- Parent: JYP Entertainment

Studio J is an in-house label created by Park Jin-young in January 2015. Park described Studio J as a label which will launch JYPE into a new direction in music. The sub-label will create music which rather than appealing to the mainstream will instead showcase free and deep artists. Few days later he revealed G.Soul to be the first artist on Studio J's roster.

== History ==
J. Y. Park announced the new label that "rather than appealing to the mainstream we hope to showcase free and deep artists.” On January 19, 2015, G.Soul made his debut with the album Coming Home and became the first artist of Studio J after being a trainee for 15 years.

On September 7, 2015, Studio J debuted its first group, a six-membered pop-rock band Day6 namely: Sungjin/박성진 (guitar), Jae/박제형 (guitar), Young K/Brian/강영현 (bass), Junhyeok/임준혁 (keyboard), Wonpil/김원필 (synthesizer), and Dowoon/윤도운 (drum).

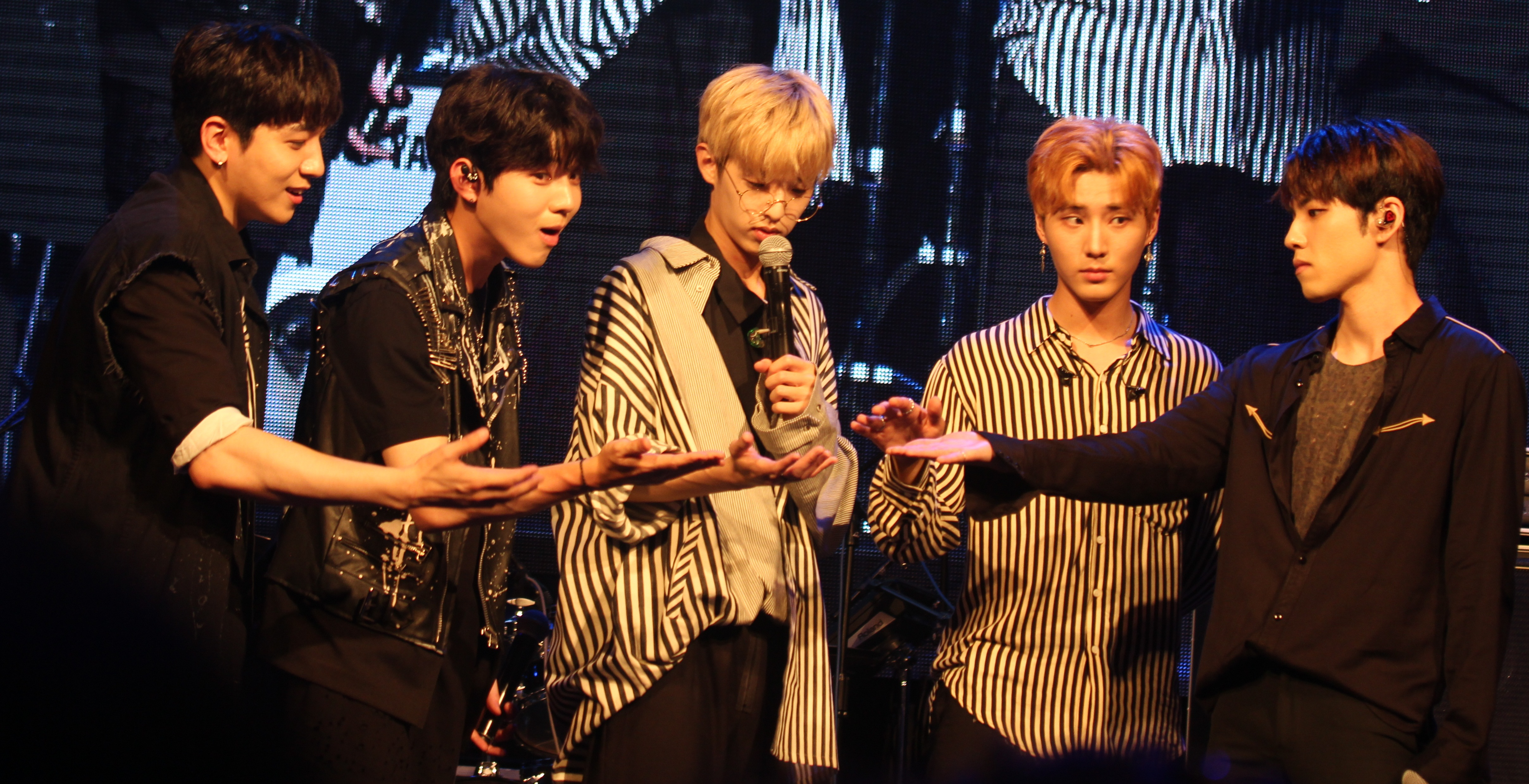

On December 29, 2016, Studio J announced that Day6 will have their monthly project in 2017 titled Every DAY6. The project would release two songs every month on the sixth (except May, June, August and October) along with concerts before the release of monthly song.

On November 1, 2021, JYP announced their new band Xdinary Heroes.

== Artists ==
Groups/Bands

- Day6
- Xdinary Heroes

Sub-unit

- Even of Day

Soloists

- Young K
- Dowoon
- Wonpil
- Sungjin

== Former artists ==
- Park Jimin (2012–2019)
- Baek Yerin (2012–2019)
- Baek A Yeon (2012–2019)
- G.Soul (2015–2017)
- Jo Kwon
- Day6
  - Junhyeok (2015–2016)
  - Jae Park (2015–2021)
- Bernard Park (2014–2022)
- Xdinary Heroes
  - Gunil (2021–2026)

== Discography ==
=== 2015 ===
Released	Title	Artist	Format	Language
January 19	Coming Home	G.Soul	CD, download	Korean
April 5	"Hopeless Love"	Park Ji-min	Download	Korean
June 29	"Love Me Again"	G.Soul	Download	Korean
September 7	The Day	Day6	CD, Download	Korean
September 10	Dirty	G.Soul	CD, Download	Korean
November 30	Frank	Baek Ye-rin	CD, Download	Korean, English

=== 2016 ===
Released	Title	Artist	Format	Language
February 15	Crosswalk	Jo Kwon	CD, download	Korean
February 16	"Smooth Operatore"	G.Soul feat. San E	Download	Korean
March 30	Daydream	Day6	CD, download	Korean
May 11	"Far, Far Away"	G.Soul	Download	Korean
June 20	"Bye Bye My Blue"	Baek Ye-rin	Download	Korean
August 23	19 to 20	Park Ji-min	CD, download	Korean
December 7	"Love You on Christmas"	Baek Ye-rin	Download	Korean
December 20	"Look Alike"	Park Ji-min & D.ear	Download	Korean

=== 2017 ===
Released	Title	Artist	Format	Language
January 6	"I Wait"	Day6	Download	Korean
February 6	"You Were Beautiful"	Day6	Download	Korean
February 17	"Come Over"	Baek Ye-rin & Dean	Download	Korean
March 6	"How Can I Say"	Day6	Download	Korean
April 6	"I'm Serious"	Day6	Download	Korean
May 8	"Dance Dance"	Day6	Download	Korean
May 8	"Take Me Home"	Primeboi feat. Park Ji-min	Download	Korean
May 18	"Light"	The Quiett feat. Baek Ye-rin	Download	Korean
May 29	Bittersweet	Baek A-yeon	CD, download	Korean
June 7	Sunrise	Day6	CD, download	Korean
June 28	"Blame"	Bernard Park feat. Changmo	Download	Korean
July 6	"Hi Hello"	Day6	Download	Korean
August 7	"What Can I Do"	Day6	Download	Korean
September 6	"I Loved You"	Day6	Download	Korean
September 29	"When You Love Someone"	Day6	Download	Korean
November 6	"All Alone"	Day6	Download	Korean
November 7	"Say I Love You" (Meloholic OST Part 2)	Park Ji-min	Download	Korean
November 30	"Why"	Jun. K feat. Park Ji-min	Download	Korean
December 1	"The Little Match Girl"	Baek A-yeon with Wendy of Red Velvet	Download	Korean
December 6	Moonrise	Day6	CD, download	Korean

=== 2018 ===
Released	Title	Artist	Format	Language
January 22	"Nirvana (with Ravi)"	Park Ji-min	Download	Korean
February 4	"The Covered Up Road" (가리워진 길) (Radio Romance OST)	Bernard Park	Download	Korean
March 14	If (Mata Aetara)	Day6	CD, download	Japanese
April 25	"Save Me (with JERO)"	Park Ji-min	Download	Korean
May 21	"Was it You" (너였었니) (Wok of Love OST)	Baek A-yeon	Download	Korean
June 6	The Best Day	Day6	CD, download	Japanese
June 17	"Stop The Rain"	Day6	Download	Japanese
June 26	Shoot Me: Youth Part 1	Day6	CD, download	Korean
September 4	jiminxjamie	Park Ji-min	CD, download	Korean
September 10	"Beautiful Feeling"	Day6	Download	Korean
September 18	"Breaking Down"	Day6	Download	Japanese
October 10	"Still..."	Bernard Park	Download	Korean
October 15	"I'm All Ears" (다둘어줄게) (with Choi Youngjae)	Park Ji-min	Download	Korean
October 17	Unlock	Day6	CD, download	Japanese
November 6	"Chocolate" (Want More 19 OST)	Day6	Download	Korean
November 15	"Games"	Park Ji-min & Jung Jin Woo	Download	Korean
November 17	"What Are You Doing Now" (너는 지금쯤)	Day6	Download	Korean
November 21	Dear Me	Baek A-yeon	CD, download	Korean
December 10	Remember Us: Youth Part 2	Day6	CD, download	Korean
December 11	"Why" (Webtoon YEONNOM (웹툰 연놈) OST)	Baek A-yeon	Download	Korean

=== 2019 ===
Released	Title	Artist	Format	Language
January 10	"Always Be With You" (Encounter OST)	Baek A-yeon	Download	Korean
January 16	"Deep Voice" (The Last Empress OST)	Park Ji-min	Download	Korean
February 19	"둘만의 이야기" (Anna, Mari OST)	Baek A-yeon	Download	Korean
March 18	Our Love Is Great	Baek Ye-rin	CD, download	Korean
July 15	The Book of Us: Gravity	Day6	CD, download	Korean
October 22	The Book of Us: Entropy	Day6	CD, download	Korean
December 4	The Best Day2	Day6	CD, download	Japanese

=== 2020 ===
Released	Title	Artist	Format	Language
May 11	The Book of Us: The Demon	Day6	CD, download	Korean
August 31	The Book of Us: Gluon	Even of Day	CD, download	Korean

=== 2021 ===
Released	Title	Artist	Format	Language
April 19	The Book of Us: Negentropy	Day6	CD, download	Korean
July 5	Right Through Me	Even of Day	CD, download	Korean
September 6	Eternal	Young K	CD, download	Korean
September 27	"Out of the Blue"	Dowoon	Download	Korean
November 15	"Bad Influence"	Bernard Park	Download	Korean
December 6	"Happy Death Day"	Xdinary Heroes	Download	Korean

=== 2022 ===
Released	Title	Artist	Format	Language
February 7	Pilmography	Wonpil	CD, download	Korean
July 20	Hello, World!	Xdinary Heroes	CD, download	Korean
September 26	To Whom It May Concern	Bernard Park	CD, download	Korean
November 11	Overload	Xdinary Heroes	CD, download	Korean

=== 2023 ===
Released	Title	Artist	Format	Language
April 26	Deadlock	Xdinary Heroes	CD, download	Korean
June 23	"Better Day"	Young K	Download	Korean
September 4	Letters with Notes	Young K	CD, download	Korean
October 11	Livelock	Xdinary Heroes	CD, download	Korean

=== 2024 ===
Released	Title	Artist	Format	Language
March 18	Fourever	Day6	CD, download	Korean
April 30	Troubleshooting	Xdinary Heroes	CD, download	Korean
June 3	"Boy Comics"	Xdinary Heroes	Download	Korean
July 8	"Love and Fear"	Xdinary Heroes	Download	Korean
August 5	"Save Me"	Xdinary Heroes	Download	Korean
September 2	Band Aid	Day6	CD, download	Korean
September 9	"Instead!"	Xdinary Heroes feat. Yoon Do-hyun	Download	Korean
October 14	Live and Fall	Xdinary Heroes	CD, download	Korean
November 5	30	Sungjin	CD, download	Korean

=== 2025 ===
Released	Title	Artist	Format	Language
March 24	Beautiful Mind	Xdinary Heroes	CD, download	Korean
May 7	"Maybe Tomorrow"	Day6	Download	Korean
July 7	"Fire (My Sweet Misery)"	Xdinary Heroes	Download	English
September 5	The Decade	Day6	CD, download	Korean
October 24	LXVE to DEATH	Xdinary Heroes	CD, download	Korean
December 15	"Lovin' the Christmas"	Day6	Download	Korean

=== 2026 ===
Released	Title	Artist	Format	Language
March 25	"X room"	Xdinary Heroes	Download	Korean
March 30	Unpiltered	Wonpil	CD, Download	Korean
April 17	Dead And	Xdinary Heroes	CD, Download	Korean
July 27	Youngest	Young K	CD, Download	Korean
October 12	Impulse	Xdinary Heroes	CD, Download	Korean
