= Remember Us =

Remember Us may refer to:

- Remember Us: Youth Part 2, an EP by Day6, 2018
- Remember Us, an EP by John Morgan, 2023
- "Remember Us", a song by John Legend from Bigger Love, 2020
- "Remember Us", a song by Stan Walker from All In, 2022
- Remember Us (Bizi Hatırla), a 2018 Turkish film by Çağan Irmak
- Remember Us: American Sacrifice, Dutch Freedom, and a Forever Promise Forged in World War II, a book by Robert M. Edsel, 2025
