= Eternal (Young K EP) =

EP by Young K
- Released: September 6, 2021
- Genre: K-pop
- Length: 24:27
- Language: Korean
- Labels: Studio J; JYP
- Producer: Young K

Young K chronology
Eternal (2021)	Letters with Notes (2023)

Singles from Eternal
- 1. "Guard You" Released: September 6, 2021; 2. "Come as You Are" Released: September 13, 2021

Professional ratings
Review scores
Source	Rating
NME	4/5 stars

Eternal is the first EP by South Korean singer-songwriter Young K. It was released on September 6, 2021, by JYP Entertainment. The EP consists of 7 songs, all written and composed or co-composed by Young K, including the lead single "Guard You" and sub-single "Come as You Are". The EP features South Korean singer-songwriter Dvwn on "Microphone".

According to Young K, the name Eternal is derived from his Korean name "Young-hyun". He tweaked the words and changed it to "Young-won" which translates to eternal. Eternal tells a story of "Kang Young-hyun (Young K's real name) as a person" and “Young K as an artist”.

Young K enlisted in mandatory military service on October 12, 2021, a month after the EP release.

== Background and release ==
On August 16, 2021 JYP Entertainment revealed that Young K is preparing to release his first solo album, six years after debuting as a member of Day6. On the same day, Young K held a V Live broadcast and confirmed that he will indeed be releasing a solo album titled, Eternal, soon. He also explained that the reason why he is releasing this album so soon after the release of Right Through Me, the second EP of Day6's sub-unit Day6 (Even of Day), is because he will be enlisting in the military soon on October 12, 2021. He added, "I'm working hard to prepare as fast as possible in order to show fans as much as I can before I go. Let's laugh and smile as much as we can. I wanted to show a good side of myself in order to make a lot of people happy."

Then on August 20 at midnight KST, JYP Entertainment announced via Day6's social media accounts that Young K's solo debut mini-album Eternal would be released on September 6, 2021, at 6pm KST.

An hour prior to the official release of the EP, Young K hosted a live showcase, and performed all the songs from the mini-album, in addition to talking about the creative process and story behind Eternal.

The EP was released to digital music and streaming platforms on September 6, 2021, along with an intense and dramatic music video for "Guard You". The album's CDs were made available for pre-order prior to the album release, and were released on September 6, 2023, as well. On September 13, 2021, a second soft, sweet and homely music video for "Come as You Are" was released.

== Track listing ==
All lyrics are written by Young K, except where note.

Eternal track listing
No.	Title	Lyrics	Music	Arrangement	Length
1.	"Best Song" (베스트 송)		Young K; Hong Ji-sang	Hong	3:41
2.	"Guard You" (끝까지 안아 줄게)		Young K; Hong	Hong	3:17
3.	"Not Gonna Love" (사랑은 얼어 죽을)		Young K; Hong	Hong	3:12
4.	"Microphone" (featuring Dvwn)	Young K; Dvwn	Young K; HotSauce	HotSauce	3:16
5.	"Want to Love You"		Young K; Jeon Da-sol	Jeon Da-sol	3:27
6.	"Come as You Are" (그대로 와 줘요)		Young K; Hong	Hong	3:28
7.	"Goodnight, Dear" (잘 자라 내 사람아)		Young K	Jukjae	4:04
Total length:					24:27

== Charts ==
=== Weekly charts ===
Chart performance for Eternal
Chart (2021)	Peak position
South Korean Albums (Gaon)	8

=== Monthly charts ===
Monthly chart performance for Eternal
Chart (2022)	Position
South Korean Albums (Gaon)	10

== Release history ==
Release dates and formats for Eternal
Region	Date	Format(s)	Label
Various	September 6, 2021	Digital download; streaming	Studio J; JYP
South Korea	September 6, 2021	CD	Studio J; JYP
