= Welcome to the Show (Day6 song) =

Single by Day6

from the EP Fourever
- Language: Korean
- Released: March 18, 2024
- Length: 3:37
- Label: JYP
- Composers: Young K; Sungjin; Wonpil; Hong Ji-sang
- Lyricist: Young K

Day6 singles chronology
"You Make Me" (2021)	"Welcome to the Show" (2024)	"Melt Down" (2024)

Music video
- "Welcome to the Show" on YouTube

"Welcome to the Show" is a song recorded by South Korean boy band Day6 for their eighth extended play, Fourever. It was released as the EP's lead single by JYP Entertainment on March 18, 2024. The song marked the first release of Day6 as a four-member band following the departure of member Jae in December 2021.

== Background and release ==
On February 16, 2024, it was announced that Day6 had been filming a music video for a March comeback. On March 4, 2024 JYP Entertainment released the trailer film of the new mini album Fourever, making it their first release in over three years, after all the members had successfully completed their two years mandatory military service in December 2023. On March 18, 2024, both "Welcome to the Show" and their eighth EP, Fourever, were released.

== Composition ==
"Welcome to the Show" Is written by Young K and composed by Young K, Sungjin, Wonpil and Hong Ji-sang. The song is composed in the key A Major and has 132 beats per minute and a running time of 3 minutes and 37 seconds. "Welcome to the Show" is described as a serenade for those who stood hand in hand on the stage of the world. Lyrics such as "If so Then let's go Welcome to the show" meet with magnificent music with progressive house genre elements added on the post-brit pop sound and give overwhelming emotions.

== Promotion ==
Day6 held their first comeback stage for "Welcome to the Show" on Mnet's M Countdown on March 21, KBS's Music Bank on March 22, and SBS's Inkigayo on the March 24, 2024.

== Charts ==
=== Weekly charts ===
Weekly chart performance for "Welcome to the Show"
Chart (2024)	Peak position
South Korea (Circle)	3
South Korea (K-pop Hot 100)	7

=== Monthly charts ===
Monthly chart performance for "Welcome to the Show"
Chart (September 2024)	Peak position
South Korea (Circle)	4

=== Year-end Chart ===
2024 year-end chart performance for "Welcome to the Show"
Chart (2024)	Position
South Korea (Circle)	17

2025 year-end chart performance for "Welcome to the Show"
Chart (2025)	Position
South Korea (Circle)	25

== Certifications ==
Certifications for "Welcome to the Show"
Region	Certification	Certified units/sales
Streaming
South Korea (KMCA)	Platinum	100,000,000^{†}
^{†} Streaming-only figures based on certification alone.

== Awards and nominations ==
Awards and nominations for "Welcome to the Show"
Year	Organization	Award	Result	Ref.
2025	Golden Disc Awards	Digital Song Bonsang	Won	
2025	Golden Disc Awards	Digital Daesang (Song of the Year)	Nominated	

== Publication lists ==
Publication lists for "Welcome to the Show"
Publication	List	Rank	Ref.
IZM	2024 Domestic Single of the Year	Placed	
Paste	The 20 Best K-Pop Songs of 2024	13	

== Release history ==
Release history
Region	Date	Format	Label
Various	March 18, 2024	Digital download; streaming	JYP
