= Band Aid (EP) =

- Digital cover

EP by Day6
- Released: September 2, 2024
- Length: 25:24
- Language: Korean
- Labels: Studio J; JYP
- Producer: Hong Ji-sang

Day6 chronology
Fourever (2024)	Band Aid (2024)	The Decade (2025)

Singles from Band Aid
- 1. "Melt Down" Released: September 2, 2024

Band Aid is the ninth extended play (EP) by South Korean band Day6, released on September 2, 2024, through Studio J and JYP Entertainment. Produced by frequent collaborator Hong Ji-sang, the EP was co-written by all band members. The EP contains eight tracks led by the single "Melt Down" with a theme revolving around comfort and healing.

Band Aid will be supported by a world tour, titled the Forever Young Tour (2024–25).

== Background ==
Day6 released their eighth extended play (EP) Fourever on March 18, 2024, as the group's first release since their hiatus from military service and Jae's departure from the band. During their hiatus and promotions for Fourever, the band's back catalog received a surge in popularity, with "Time of Our Life", the lead single of The Book of Us: Gravity (2019), charting at number 10 at the Circle Digital Chart for the first half of 2024.

== Music and lyrics ==
Band Aid has a runtime of 25 minutes and 24 seconds across eight tracks. Thematically, the songs revolve around comfort and warmth. "Melt Down" is characterized by melodic punk sounds accentuated by a drum beat; its lyrics narrate the emotion brought by finding a love that heals and brings warmth to one's life.

== Release and promotion ==
Band Aid was released on September 2, 2024, as the band's ninth EP, with "Melt Down" supporting the EP as the lead single. The EP's title combines the words "band" to represent the members as a rock band and the word "aid" as a "promise" to provide help.

The band's first release in six months, JYP Entertainment announced the EP and its title on August 9. A three-minute film depicting the album's concept was released on August 19. A "track preview film", previewing the album's tracks through instrumental snippets played by the members, was released on August 21.

=== Forever Young Tour ===
On August 11, the agency announced that Day6 would embark on the Forever Young World tour in support of Band Aid and Fourever, announcing 15 dates across 11 stops in Asia, beginning with three shows at the Inspire Arena in Incheon, South Korea, from September 20 to 22, and concluding with a show at the Araneta Coliseum in Quezon City, Philippines, on February 22, 2025.

== Track listing ==
All tracks are arranged by Hong Ji-sang.

Band Aid track listing
No.	Title	Lyrics	Music	Length
1.	"Monster" (괴물)	Young K	Sungjin; Young K; Wonpil; Dowoon; Hong Ji-sang	3:37
2.	"Melt Down" (녹아내려요)	Young K	Sungjin; Young K; Wonpil; Hong Ji-sang	2:50
3.	"She Smiled" (그녀가 웃었다)	Sungjin; Wonpil; Hong Ji-sang	Sungjin; Young K; Wonpil; Hong Ji-sang	3:29
4.	"Shxtty Game" (망겜)	Young K	Sungjin; Young K; Wonpil; Hong Ji-sang	3:12
5.	"Help Me Rock&Roll" (도와줘요 Rock&Roll)	Sungjin; Wonpil; Hong Ji-sang	Sungjin; Wonpil; Hong Ji-sang	2:37
6.	"Counter"	Young K	Sungjin; Young K; Wonpil; Hong Ji-sang	3:00
7.	"I'm Fine"	Sungjin; Young K; Wonpil; Hong Ji-sang	Sungjin; Young K; Wonpil; Hong Ji-sang	3:19
8.	"Still There" (아직 거기 살아)	Young K	Sungjin; Young K; Wonpil; Hong Ji-sang	3:20
Total length:				25:24

== Charts ==
=== Weekly charts ===
Weekly chart performance for Band Aid
Chart (2024)	Peak position
South Korean Albums (Circle)	4

=== Monthly charts ===
Monthly chart performance for Band Aid
Chart (2024)	Peak position
South Korean Albums (Circle)	11

== Release history ==
Release dates and formats for Band Aid
Region	Date	Format	Label
Various	September 2, 2024	CD; digital download; streaming	Studio J; JYP
