= Zombie (Day6 song) =

Single by Day6

from the EP The Book of Us: The Demon
- Language: Korean
- Released: May 11, 2020
- Length: 3:29
- Label: JYP
- Composers: Jae; Hong Ji-sang
- Lyricists: Young K; Wonpil

Day6 singles chronology
"Finale" (2019)	"Zombie" (2020)	"You Make Me" (2021)

Music video
- "Zombie" on YouTube

"Zombie" is a song recorded by South Korean boy band Day6 for their sixth extended play The Book of Us: The Demon. It was released as the EP's lead single by JYP Entertainment on May 11, 2020.

== Background and release ==
On April 20, 2020, JYP Entertainment reported that Day6 would be making a comeback on May 11. From May 2 through May 6, the band released five pairs of teaser photos of the extended play, each featuring individual members. On May 7, the band released a set of group photo teasers for "Zombie". On May 9, the music video teaser of the "Zombie" was released. On May 11, 2020, both "Zombie" and their sixth EP The Book of Us: The Demon were released.

== Composition ==
"Zombie" Is written by Young K and Wonpil composed by Jae and Homg Ji-sang. The song has been described as having hip-hop-based rhythm and ballad-like chord progression" and "rock sound and powerful vocals". The song has been compared to people who live a repetitive daily life without any emotion to a 'zombie'.

== Music video ==
The music video features model Kim Ji-hoon, who plays the main character who walks in a busy city like a zombie, and as soon as he returns to his room, he lays down as if he was tired, creating an empty atmosphere. It was directed by Naive Creative Production.

== Promotion ==
On May 10, 2020 JYP Entertainment announced that Day6 would not hold any promotion for the song because the members want to focus on their health.

== Charts ==
=== Weekly charts ===
Weekly chart performance for "Zombie"
Chart (2020)	Peak position
South Korea (Circle)	18
South Korea (K-pop Hot 100)	15
US World Digital Songs (Billboard)	13

=== Monthly charts ===
Monthly chart performance for "Zombie"
Chart (May 2020)	Peak position
South Korea (Circle)	68

== Awards and nominations ==
Awards and nominations
Award ceremony	Year	Category	Nominee / Work	Result	Ref.
Mnet Asian Music Awards	2020	Best Band Performance	"Zombie"	Won	
Mnet Asian Music Awards	2020	Song of the Year	"Zombie"	Nominated	

== Publication list ==
"Zombie" on listicles
Critic/Publication	List	Rank	Ref.
IZM	Top 10 singles of 2020	—N/a	

== Release history ==
Release history
Region	Date	Format	Label
Various	May 11, 2020	Digital download; streaming	JYP
