= Fourever =

- Digital cover

EP by Day6
- Released: March 18, 2024
- Genre: K-pop
- Length: 24:22
- Language: Korean
- Labels: Studio J; JYP
- Producer: Hong Ji-sang

Day6 chronology
The Book of Us: Negentropy (2021)	Fourever (2024)	Band Aid (2024)

Singles from Fourever
- 1. "Welcome to the Show" Released: March 18, 2024

Fourever is the eighth extended play by South Korean band Day6. It was released by JYP Entertainment on March 18, 2024, and serves as their first release as a quartet since the departure of lead vocalist and guitarist Jae. The EP contains seven tracks co-written by several members of the band and produced by Hong Ji-sang. Despite not being a single, "Happy" reached number one on the Circle Digital Chart in September 2024, a week after "Melt Down", the lead single of the band's following EP Band Aid, topped the chart.

== Background and release ==
During the group's hiatus, the group's back catalog experienced a resurgent success, with "You Were Beautiful" from Sunrise (2017) and "Time of Our Life" from The Book of Us: Gravity (2019) experiencing a rise in streams on digital platforms. JYP Entertainment announced the group's comeback on February 28, with the comeback film. On March 18, JYP Entertainment released the album and the title song "Welcome to the Show".

== Accolades ==
=== Listicles ===
Name of publisher, year listed, name of listicle, and placement
Publisher	Year	Listicle	Placement	Ref.
Billboard	2024	The 20 Best K-Pop Albums of 2024 (So Far): Staff Picks	9th	
Billboard	2024	The 25 Best K-Pop Albums of 2024 : Staff Picks	11th	

== Track listing ==
All tracks are arranged by Hong Ji-sang.

Fourever track listing
No.	Title	Lyrics	Music	Length
1.	"Welcome to the Show"	Young K	Sungjin; Young K; Wonpil; Hong Ji-sang	3:37
2.	"Happy"	Young K	Sungjin; Wonpil; Hong Ji-sang	3:09
3.	"The Power of Love"	Young K	Sungjin; Young K; Wonpil; Hong Ji-sang	3:22
4.	"Get the Hell Out" (널 제외한 나의 뇌)	Young K	Sungjin; Wonpil; Hong Ji-sang	2:46
5.	"Sad Ending" (나만 슬픈 엔딩)	Sungjin; Young K; Wonpil; Hong Ji-sang	Sungjin; Wonpil; Hong Ji-sang	3:24
6.	"Let Me Love You" (사랑하게 해주라)	Young K	Sungjin; Wonpil; Hong Ji-sang	4:03
7.	"Didn't Know" (그게 너의 사랑인지 몰랐어)	Sungjin; Young K; Wonpil; Hong Ji-sang	Sungjin; Young K; Wonpil; Hong Ji-sang	3:59
Total length:				24:22

== Charts ==
=== Weekly charts ===
Weekly chart performance for Fourever
Chart (2024)	Peak position
Nigerian Albums (TurnTable)	100
South Korean Albums (Circle)	3

=== Monthly charts ===
Monthly chart performance for Fourever
Chart (2024)	Position
South Korean Albums (Circle)	11
