= The Book of Us: Gluon =

EP by Day6 (Even of Day)
- Released: August 31, 2020
- Genre: Synth-pop; pop rock; K-pop
- Length: 18:55
- Language: Korean
- Label: JYP; Studio J
- Producer: Hong Ji-sang

Day6 (Even of Day) chronology
The Book of Us: Gluon (2020)	Right Through Me (2021)

Singles from The Book of Us: Gluon
- 1. "Where the Sea Sleeps" Released: August 31, 2020

Music video
- "Where the Sea Sleeps" on YouTube

The Book of Us: Gluon – Nothing Can Tear Us Apart, often shortened to The Book of Us: Gluon, is the first extended play by South Korean band Day6 (Even of Day), a sub-unit of Day6 consisting of members Young K, Wonpil, and Dowoon. It was released by JYP Entertainment on August 31, 2020. The album contains seven tracks co-written by Young K and Wonpil, including the lead single, "Where the Sea Sleeps".

== Background and release ==
On August 6, 2020, Day6's first sub-unit Day6 (Even of Day) was announced. On August 28, an album sampler was released revealing the track list of The Book of Us: Gluon, constituted of seven songs. The EP was released on August 31, 2020. Multiple songs are stated to have collaborations with "Denimalz 3", which Denimalz is a line of Day6 plush merchandise, with Denimalz 3 representing the 3 members present in the subunit. Denimalz 3 act as the main protagonists in the "Where the Sea Sleeps" official music video.

== Promotion ==
On September 3, the subunit held their debut stage on Mnet's M Countdown and promoted "Where the Sea Sleeps" on several music programs in South Korea, including Music Bank, Show! Music Core and Inkigayo.

== Track listing ==
The credits are Available on the official album profile on Naver

No.	Title	Lyrics	Music	Arrangement	Length
1.	"Landing -Intro- (with DENIMALZ 3)"	Young K	Hong Ji-sang	Hong Ji-sang	1:50
2.	"Landed" (그렇게 너에게 도착하였다 (Note: Geureoke Neo-ege Dochakhayeotda lit. "That's how I arrived at you"))	Young K	Young K; Wonpil; Hong Ji-sang	Hong Ji-sang	3:55
3.	"Ocean -Interlude 1- (with DENIMALZ 3)"	Young K	Young K; Hong Ji-sang	Hong Ji-sang	1:32
4.	"Where The Sea Sleeps" (파도가 끝나는 곳까지 (Note: Padoga Kkeunnaneun Kotkkaji lit. "To the end of the waves"))	Young K	Young K; Wonpil; Hong Ji-sang	Hong Ji-sang	4:18
5.	"Forest -Interlude 2- (with DENIMALZ 3)"	Young K	Hong Ji-sang	Hong Ji-sang	1:46
6.	"Thanks to" (땡스 투 (Note: Pronounced Ttaengseu Tu))	Young K; Wonpil	Young K; Wonpil; Hong Ji-sang	Hong Ji-sang	4:17
7.	"To be continued -Outro- (Sung by DENIMALZ 3)"	Young K	Young K; Wonpil; Hong Ji-sang	Hong Ji-sang	1:17
Total length:					18:55

== Charts ==
=== Album ===
Chart (2020)	Peak position	Sales
South Korean Weekly Album Chart (Gaon)	3	KOR: 42,845

=== Songs ===
Title	Year	Peak chart positions
Title	Year	KOR
"Where the Sea Sleeps" (파도가 끝나는 곳까지)	2020	67
"Landed" (그렇게 너에게 도착하였다)	2020	—
"Thanks to" (땡스 투)	2020	—
