= Pilmography =

- Digital cover

Studio album by Wonpil
- Released: February 7, 2022
- Studio: At Blank Shop (Seoul); Jisang's (Seoul); JYPE (Seoul); Tonestudio (Seoul)
- Genre: K-pop
- Length: 36:34
- Language: Korean
- Label: Studio J; JYP; Dreamus
- Producer: Kwon Dae-eun; Yeon Woo-jun

Singles from Pilmography
- 1. "Voiceless" Released: February 7, 2022

Pilmography is the debut studio album by South Korean singer Wonpil. It was released on February 7, 2022, through Studio J and JYP Entertainment. The album consists of ten tracks, including the lead single "Voiceless".

Upon release, Pilmography debuted at number one on Gaon Album Chart, making it the first chart-topper for the artist.

== Promotion ==
On March 11–13, 2022, Wonpil held his first solo concert, also named Pilmography, at Yes24 Live Hall. On March 26–27, Wonpil held his additional encore shows at Kwangwoon University.

== Track listing ==
Pilmography track listing
No.	Title	Lyrics	Music	Arrangement	Length
1.	"Voiceless" (안녕, 잘 가)	Wonpil; Young K	Wonpil; Hong Ji-sang	Hong Ji-sang	3:47
2.	"Sincerity" (지우게)	Wonpil; Young K	Wonpil; Hong Ji-sang	Hong Ji-sang	3:14
3.	"A Writer in a Love Story" (소설 속의 작가가 되어)	Wonpil	minGtion; Wonpil	minGtion	3:27
4.	"Walk with Me" (우리 더 걸을까)	Wonpil	Shim Hyun	Shim Hyun	3:02
5.	"Stranded" (외딴섬의 외톨이)	Wonpil; Young K	Wonpil; Hong Ji-sang	Hong Ji-sang	4:05
6.	"Someday, Spring Will Come" (언젠가 봄은 찾아올 거야)	Wonpil	Yoon Seok-cheol	Yoon Seok-cheol	4:34
7.	"Pieces" (휴지조각)	Wonpil; Kevin Oppa (Solcire)	Wonpil; Kevin Oppa (Solcire)	Kevin Oppa (Solcire)	3:15
8.	"Last Goodbye" (늦은 끝)	Wonpil	minGtion; Wonpil	minGtion	3:52
9.	"Unpainted Canvas" (그리다 보면)	Wonpil; Young K	Wonpil; Shim Hyun; Oh Ji-hyun	Shim Hyun; Oh Ji-hyun	3:49
10.	"A Journey" (행운을 빌어 줘)	Wonpil	Wonpil; Hong Ji-sang	Hong Ji-sang	3:29
Total length:					36:34

== Charts ==
=== Weekly charts ===
Weekly chart performance for Pilmography
Chart (2021)	Peak position
South Korean Albums (Gaon)	1

=== Monthly charts ===
Monthly chart performance for Pilmography
Chart (2022)	Peak position
South Korean Albums (Gaon)	10

== Release history ==
Release dates and formats for Pilmography
Region	Date	Format	Label
Various	February 7, 2022	CD; digital download; streaming	Studio J; JYP
South Korea	February 7, 2022	Digital download; streaming	Studio J; JYP
