= Day6 (Even of Day) =

Sub-unit of South Korean boy band Day6

- Also known as: Even of Day; KangWonDo
- Origin: Seoul, South Korea
- Genres: Pop; K-pop; rock; ballad
- Instruments: Vocals; bass; guitar; keyboard; synthesizer; drum
- Years active: 2020–present
- Labels: Studio J; JYP
- Spinoff of: Day6
- Members: Young K; Wonpil; Dowoon

Day6 (Even of Day), also known as Even of Day, is the first sub-unit of the band Day6 based in South Korea, consisting of Young K, Wonpil and Dowoon. Formed by JYP Entertainment, they debuted on August 31, 2020, with their first EP The Book of Us: Gluon.

== History ==
In May 2020, prior to the release of the Day6's album The Book of Us: The Demon, it was announced that the group would cancel promotions of the album and go on hiatus due to the mental health issues of some members, later revealed to be leader Sungjin and guitarist Jae. Even of Day was formed with the remaining active members: bassist Young K, keyboardist Wonpil, and drummer Dowoon. On August 6, following rumors of the sub-unit, the group's label JYP Entertainment confirmed the sub-unit's formation, with details of its debut to follow.

On August 11, JYPE officially introduced Day6's first sub-unit project, Even of Day, five years since their debut. JYPE released a teaser image announcing the unit on Day6's social media pages. The unit name "Even of Day" was given by Park Jin-young, JYPE's founder: "Even" is an old way of saying "night", so "Even of Day" conveys the message that a bright day will finally come after a dark night. On August 13, they dropped the teaser schedule for their debut with the EP The Book of Us: Gluon, which marked the fourth installment of Day6's The Book of Us series. The Book of Us: Gluon, alongside its lead single "Where the Sea Sleeps," was released on August 31. The album debuted at number three on the Gaon Album Chart.

Even of Day partook in the first segment of the web music show Secret Atelier where they released a single, "So, This Is Love," on January 15, 2021, as a result of the show. On January 24, Even of Day held their first online concert, Online Party Night: The Arcane Salon. On July 5, the group made their first comeback with their second EP Right Through Me and its title track of the same name. Even of Day held their second concert, Day6 Even of Day: Right Through Me, through the online concert platform Beyond Live on August 8. On August 31, 2022, the unit released a special music video for "Darling on the Beach".

== Members ==
- Young K (Korean: 영케이) – main vocals, rap, bass, guitar
- Wonpil (Korean: 원필) – main vocals, keyboard, synthesizer
- Dowoon (Korean: 도운) – sub vocals, drum

== Discography ==
=== Extended plays ===
List of extended plays, with selected chart positions and sales
Title	Details	Peak chart positions	Sales
Title	Details	KOR	Sales
The Book of Us: Gluon	Released: August 31, 2020; Label: JYP Entertainment; Formats: CD, digital download, streaming	3	KOR: 83,601
Right Through Me	Released: July 5, 2021; Label: JYP Entertainment; Formats: CD, digital download, streaming	3	KOR: 72,207

=== Singles ===
List of singles, with selected chart positions, showing year released and album name
Title	Year	Peak chart positions		Album
Title	Year	KOR	KOR Hot	Album
"Where the Sea Sleeps" (파도가 끝나는 곳까지)	2020	67	38	The Book of Us: Gluon
"Right Through Me" (뚫고 지나가요)	2021	94	60	Right Through Me
"Maplelatte" (메이플라떼)	2025	193	—	Dear.M OST
"—" denotes releases that did not chart.

== Tours and concerts ==
=== Online concerts ===
- Online Party Night: The Arcane Salon (2020)
- Day6 (Even of Day): Right Through Me (2021)

== Filmography ==
=== Music videos ===
Title	Year	Director(s)	Ref.
"Where the Sea Sleeps" (파도가 끝나는 곳까지)	2020	SUIKO (KOINRUSH Studio)	
"Right Through Me" (뚫고 지나가요)	2021	NOVV	
"Darling on the Beach" (해변의 달링)	2022	INSP (KOINRUSH Studio)	

=== Variety shows ===
Year	Title	Network	Notes	Ref.
2021	Summer Melody	V Live; YouTube		
