= 19 to 20 =

EP by Park Ji-min
- Released: August 23, 2016
- Recorded: 2016 at JYP Studios, Seoul, South Korea
- Genres: R&B; soul; dance
- Length: 21:00
- Language: Korean
- Labels: JYP; Studio J; KT Music
- Producer: J.Y. Park (exec.)

Park Ji-min chronology
19 to 20 (2016)	jiminxjamie (2018)

Singles from 19 to 20
- 1. "다시 (Try)" Released: August 23, 2016

Music video
- Try on YouTube

19 to 20 is the debut extended play by South Korean singer Jimin Park, released on August 23, 2016 by JYP Entertainment.

== Background and release ==
On August 10, JYP Entertainment confirmed that Park Jimin currently prepared her comeback in mid-August. On August 16, Jimin dropped a teaser image for her comeback with title track ″Try″, set to be released on August 23. On August 19, the music video teaser for the title track was released and the album titled ″19 to 20″ confirmed for release on August 23.

== Track listing ==
All tracks co-written and co-composed by Park Ji-min.

No.	Title	Lyrics	Music	Arranger(s)	Length
1.	"Try" (Korean: 다시)	CHLOE; NODAY	CHLOE; NODAY	CHLOE; NODAY	3:32
2.	"Young해" (20 (featuring Day6's Young K))	Young K	220; Royal Dive	220; Royal Dive	3:46
3.	"Walkin'" (featuring Hash Swan)	NATHAN; Hash Swan	NATHAN	NATHAN	3:23
4.	"Answer"	Young K; NATHAN	NATHAN	NATHAN	3:20
5.	"to him"	Shim Eun-ji	Shim Eun-ji	윤석철	3:41
6.	"Answer" (Demo ver.)	NATHAN	NATHAN	NATHAN	3:19
Total length:					21:00

== Release history ==
Region	Date	Format	Label
Worldwide	August 23, 2016	Digital download	JYP Entertainment
South Korea	August 23, 2016	Digital download	JYP Entertainment
