= The Book of Us: Entropy =

Album by DAY6

Studio album by Day6
- Released: October 22, 2019
- Genre: Pop rock; K-pop
- Length: 37:25
- Language: Korean
- Label: JYP Entertainment; Studio J

Day6 chronology
The Book of Us: Gravity (2019)	The Book of Us: Entropy (2019)	The Best Day2 (2019)

Singles from The Book of Us: Entropy
- 1. "Sweet Chaos" Released: October 22, 2019

Music video
- "Sweet Chaos" on YouTube

The Book of Us: Entropy is the third Korean-language studio album by South Korean band Day6. It was released by JYP Entertainment on October 22, 2019. The lead single "Sweet Chaos" was released the same day. The album debuted at number four on the Gaon Album Chart.

== Background and release ==
On September 28, 2019, it was reported that Day6 would be returning with new music in October after fans discovered an advertisement at a subway station depicting Day6's logo with the date October 22 and the time 6 pm. Day6's agency JYP Entertainment later confirmed, "it is true that Day6 will come back on October 22". On October 6, 2019, a prologue film entitled The Book of Us: Entropy was released on Youtube. Pre-orders for the physical album opened on October 7, it became available in two versions: "Sweet" and "Chaos". On October 8, 2019, the tracklist was released, consisting of 11 new tracks. On October 10, individual "graphic image" teasers for each member were released. Following that, a series of individual and group photo teasers were revealed from October 11–20. The first music video teaser for the lead single "Sweet Chaos" was released on October 20 and an album sampler was revealed the following day.

== Composition ==
Musically, the rock album incorporates several retro music genres including glam metal, disco, bossa nova and reggae. The lead single, "Sweet Chaos" has been described as a swing number that combines groove with punk rock. Talking about the album, Young K explained that The Book of Us: Entropy "features the process of changes a person's relationship with another person weaves." He further added, "The process is sometime heartwarming, but other times, it's chilling." Thematically, the album explores "the chaotic but dazzling entrance into a romantic relationship and chilling exit that follows."

== Track listing ==
No.	Title	Lyrics	Music	Arrangement	Length
1.	"Deep in Love"	Young K	Jae; Sungjin; Young K; Wonpil; Hong Jisang	Hong Jisang	3:47
2.	"Sweet Chaos"	Young K	Jae; Sungjin; Young K; Wonpil; Hong Jisang	Hong Jisang	3:47
3.	"Emergency"	Jae; Shim Eun Ji; Lee Hae Sol	Jae; Shim Eun Ji; Lee Hae Sol	Shim Eun Ji; Lee Hae Sol	3:18
4.	"Rescue Me"	Young K; Wonpil	Jae; Wonpil; FRANTS	Shim Eun Ji; Lee Hae Sol	3:22
5.	"365247"	Young K	Young K; FRANTS	FRANTS	2:53
6.	"About Now" (지금쯤)	Jae; mr. cho	Jae; mr. cho	mr. cho	2:59
7.	"Ouch" (아야야)	Young K	Young K; Nuplay (KIME, MHL, Jo Chang Hyun); Sean M. Sinclair	Nuplay (KIME, MHL, Jo Chang Hyun); Sean M. Sinclair	3:17
8.	"Not Fine"	Young K	Jae; Sungjin; Young K; Wonpil; Hong Jisang	Hong Jisang	3:36
9.	"Stop Talking" (막말)	Young K	Jae; Young K; Nuplay (203, Swavey Child)	203 (Nuplay)	3:47
10.	"Not Mine"	Wonpil; Jeon Da Sol; Jae Do Gi	Wonpil; Jeon Da Sol; Jae Do Gi	Jeon Da Sol	3:16
11.	"Like a Flowing Wind" (마치 흘러가는 바람처럼)	Young K; Wonpil	Wonpil; Kim Yeon Seo; minGtion	minGtion	3:23
Total length:					37:25

== Charts ==
Chart (2019)	Peak position
French Digital Albums (SNEP)	157
South Korean Albums (Gaon)	4
US World Albums (Billboard)	10

== Accolades ==
Year-end lists
Critic/Publication	List	Song	Rank	Ref.
Refinery29	The Best K-Pop Songs Of 2019	"Sweet Chaos"	2	

== Release history ==
Region	Date	Format	Label
South Korea	October 22, 2019	CD; digital download; streaming	JYP Entertainment; Studio J
Various	October 22, 2019		
