= The Book of Us: Negentropy – Chaos Swallowed Up in Love =

The Book of Us: Negentropy
- Digital and streaming cover

EP by Day6
- Released: April 19, 2021
- Genre: Synth-pop; pop rock; K-pop
- Length: 26:16
- Language: Korean
- Label: JYP; Studio J
- Producer: Hong Ji-sang; Atomik (Nuplay); Kime (Nuplay); Sungjin

Day6 chronology
The Book of Us: The Demon (2020)	The Book of Us: Negentropy (2021)	Fourever (2024)

Singles from The Book of Us: Negentropy
- 1. "You Make Me" Released: April 19, 2021

Music video
- "You make Me" on YouTube

The Book of Us: Negentropy – Chaos Swallowed Up in Love, often shortened to The Book of Us: Negentropy, is the seventh extended play by South Korean band Day6. It was released by JYP Entertainment on April 19, 2021, and serves as the fifth and final installment of the group's three-year Book of Us series. It is Day6's first release as a whole group since The Book of Us: The Demon (2020), and marks the return of members Sungjin and Jae following their hiatus from the group. The album contains seven tracks co-written by several members of the band and produced by Hong Ji-sang, member Sungjin, and NUPLAY.

Following Sungjin's enlistment in the South Korean military in March 2021, the band opted not to promote the album as an incomplete group. The Book of Us: Negentropy was supported by its lead single, "You Make Me", and peaked at number three at the Gaon Album Chart.

It also serves as the quintet's final release with the lead vocalist Jae Park before his departure from JYP Entertainment on December 31, 2021 and departure from the group on January 1, 2022.

== Background and release ==
JYP Entertainment announced the group's comeback on March 29 with the release of a comeback film. On March 30, they revealed the album title and released the trailer film. Following this, they unveiled the album track list and teaser images of each member. Starting April 11, they began releasing lyric film videos for every track.

On April 19, JYP Entertainment released the album and the title song "You Make Me" and the announcement that Day6 would come back without promotion according to Sungjin's enlistment in the military.

== Track listing ==
The credits are available on the official album profile on Naver

No.	Title	Lyrics	Music	Arrangement	Length
1.	"Everyday We Fight"	Young K; Wonpil	Jae; Hong Ji-sang	Hong Ji-sang	3:30
2.	"You Make Me"	Young K	Young K; Wonpil; Hong Ji-sang	Hong Ji-sang	3:39
3.	"Healer"	Young K	Jae; Young K; Wonpil; Hong Ji-sang	Hong Ji-sang	3:48
4.	"Only" (둘도 아닌 하나)	Young K	Sungjin; Jae; Young K; Wonpil; Hong Ji-sang	Hong Ji-sang	3:58
5.	"Above the Clouds" (구름 위에서)	Sungjin; Jae; Young K	Sungjin; Jae; Young K; Wonpil; Hong Ji-sang	Sungjin; Hong Ji-sang	4:19
6.	"One" (무적)	Young K; Wonpil	Jae; Young K; Wonpil; Hong Ji-sang	Hong Ji-sang	3:19
7.	"So Let's Love" (우리 앞으로 더 사랑하자)	Jae; Young K; ARTISEAN	Jae; Young K; atomik (NUPLAY); KIME (NUPLAY)	atomik (NUPLAY); KIME (NUPLAY)	3:42
Total length:					26:16

== Charts ==
Chart (2021)	Peak position	Sales
South Korean Weekly Album Chart (Gaon)	3	KOR: 49,643
