= Letters with Notes =

- Digital cover

Studio album by Young K
- Released: September 4, 2023
- Genre: K-pop
- Length: 33:43
- Language: Korean
- Labels: Studio J; JYP

Young K chronology
Eternal (2021)	Letters with Notes (2023)

Singles from Letters with Notes
- 1. "Let It Be Summer" Released: August 25, 2023; 2. "Nothing But" Released: September 4, 2023

Letters with Notes is the first studio album by South Korean singer Young K. It was released on September 4, 2023, through Studio J and JYP Entertainment. The album consists of eleven tracks.

== Background ==
On July 31, 2023, it was announced that Young K would have a solo comeback with a full-length album two years after releasing his first EP in 2021. This was also his first album released five months after his discharge from the military.

On August 25, 2023, he dropped the pre-release single and the third track from this album, entitled "Let It Be Summer".

== Promotion ==
On September 1–3, 2023, Young K held his first solo concert of the same name at Kwangwoon University. He performed all the songs from this album in his concert.

== Track listing ==
Letters with Notes track listing
No.	Title	Lyrics	Music	Arrangement	Length
1.	"Waited" (오늘만을 너만을 이날을)	Young K	Young K; Hong Ji-sang	Hong Ji-sang	3:22
2.	"Nothing But" (이것밖에는 없다)	Young K; Hong Ji-sang	Young K; Hong Ji-sang	Hong Ji-sang	3:21
3.	"Let It Be Summer"	Young K	Young K; Hong Ji-sang	Hong Ji-sang	3:14
4.	"Dreamer" (꿈꾼)	Young K	Young K; Hong Ji-sang	Hong Ji-sang	3:11
5.	"Bungee Jumping"	Young K	Young K; Sim Hyun	Sim Hyun	3:22
6.	"Natural"	Young K	Young K; U-LU; Nomasgood; 8Hoop	U-LU; Nomasgood; 8Hoop	2:40
7.	"Strange"	Young K	Park Mun-chi; Young K	Park Mun-chi	2:29
8.	"Soul (feat. Choi LB)"	Young K; Choi LB	Young K; Sim Hyun	Sim Hyun	3:36
9.	"Playground"	Young K	Young K; Humbert; paulkyte	Humbert	2:28
10.	"Babo"	Young K	Young K; paulkyte	paulkyte	3:05
11.	"What Is.."	Young K	Young K; Da-sol; MOGT	Da-sol; MOGT	2:55
Total length:					33:43

== Charts ==
=== Weekly charts ===
Weekly chart performance for Letters with Notes
Chart (2023)	Peak position
South Korean Albums (Circle)	5

=== Monthly charts ===
Monthly chart performance for Letters with Notes
Chart (2023)	Peak position
South Korean Albums (Circle)	16

== Release history ==
Release dates and formats for Letters with Notes
Region	Date	Format	Label
Various	September 4, 2023	CD; digital download; streaming	Studio J; JYP
