= Right Through Me =

- Digital cover

EP by Day6 (Even of Day)
- Released: July 5, 2021
- Genre: Synth-pop; pop rock; K-pop
- Length: 24:34
- Language: Korean
- Label: Studio J; JYP
- Producer: Hong Ji-sang

Day6 (Even of Day) chronology
The Book of Us: Gluon (2020)	Right Through Me (2021)

Singles from Right Through Me
- 1. "Right Through Me" Released: July 5, 2021

Music video
- "Right Through Me" on YouTube

Right Through Me is the second extended play by South Korean band Day6 (Even of Day), a sub-unit of Day6 consisting of members Young K, Wonpil, and Dowoon. It was released by Studio J and JYP Entertainment on July 5, 2021. The album contains seven tracks co-written by Young K, Wonpil, and the producer Hong Ji-sang, including the lead single of the same name, "Right Through Me".

== Track listing ==
All lyrics are written by Young K, except track six, lyrics by Wonpil & track seven, written by Young K, and Wonpil. All music is composed by Young K, Wonpil, and Hong Ji-sang, and arranged by Hong.

No.	Title	Length
1.	"We" (우린)	3:50
2.	"Right Through Me" (뚫고 지나가요)	3:37
3.	"Walk" (역대급)	3:38
4.	"All the Things You Wanted" (네가 원했던 것들)	3:15
5.	"From the Ending of a Tragedy" (비극의 결말에서)	3:09
6.	"Home Alone" (나 홀로 집에)	3:22
7.	"Love Parade"	3:43
Total length:		24:34

== Charts ==
=== Weekly charts ===
Chart performance for Right Through Me
Chart (2021)	Peak position
South Korean Albums (Gaon)	3

=== Monthly charts ===
Monthly chart performance for Right Through Me
Chart (2021)	Position
South Korean Albums (Gaon)	9
