= The Book of Us: The Demon =

EP by Day6
- Released: May 11, 2020
- Genre: K-pop; pop rock
- Length: 28:28
- Language: Korean
- Label: JYP; Studio J
- Producer: DAY6; Hong Ji-sang

Day6 chronology
The Best Day2 (2019)	The Book of Us: The Demon (2020)	The Book of Us: Negentropy (2021)

Singles from The Book of Us: The Demon
- 1. "Zombie" Released: May 11, 2020

Music video
- "Zombie" on YouTube

The Book of Us: The Demon is the sixth extended play by South Korean band Day6. It was released by JYP Entertainment on May 11, 2020. The album contains eight tracks including the lead single, "Zombie".

== Background and release ==
On April 20, 2020, it was reported that Day6 would be making a comeback on May 11. On April 27, JYP Entertainment announced the release of Day6's new album The Book of Us: The Demon, through a comeback trailer narrated in English by Jae and Young K. The album was made available for pre-orders the same day with the physical edition being available in two versions: 'Midday' and 'Midnight'. The full album tracklist was released on April 30. The album consists of 8 tracks, including an English version of the lead single "Zombie". From May 2 through May 6, the band released five pairs of teaser photos of the album, each featuring individual members. On May 7, the band released a set of group photo teasers for the lead single "Zombie". On May 8, the band released snippets of lyrics of every track of the album through 8 sets of lyric teaser photos. On May 9, the music video teaser of the title track "Zombie" was released. On May 10, the album sampler video was released featuring the highlights of the songs. The album was released on May 11, in conjunction with the release of a music video for the lead single "Zombie".

== Composition ==
The lead single, "Zombie" has been described with "hip-hop-based rhythm and ballad-like chord progression" and "rock sound and powerful vocals".

== Promotion ==
On May 10, the day before the release of the album, JYP Entertainment announced that two of the five members of the group, Park Sungjin and Jae Park, would take a temporary hiatus to focus on their health. Therefore, they did not promote the album on any music shows.

== Track listing ==
No.	Title	Lyrics	Music	Arrangement	Length
1.	"Day and Night" (해와 달처럼; Haewa Dalcheoreom [lit. "Like the Sun and Moon"])	Young K	Jae; Sungjin; Young K; Wonpil; Hong Jisang	Hong Jisang	3:25
2.	"Zombie"	Young K; Wonpil	Jae; Hong Jisang	Hong Jisang	3:29
3.	"Tick Tock"	Jae; Young K	Jae; Sungjin; Young K; Wonpil; Hong Jisang	Hong Jisang	3:53
4.	"Love me or Leave me"	Young K	Jae; Sungjin; Young K; Wonpil; Hong Jisang	Hong Jisang	3:43
5.	"STOP" (때려쳐; Ttaelyeojyeo [lit. "Quit"])	Young K	Jae; Sungjin; Young K; Wonpil; Hong Jisang	Hong Jisang	3:48
6.	"1 to 10"	Young K	Jae; Sungjin; Young K; Wonpil; Hong Jisang	Hong Jisang	3:08
7.	"Afraid"	Sungjin; Jeon Dasol; Jae Dogi	Sungjin; Jeon Dasol; Jae Dogi	재도기 (쏠시레)	3:33
8.	"Zombie" (English Ver.)	Young K; Wonpil	Jae; Hong Jisang	Hong Jisang	3:29
Total length:					28:28

== Awards and recognition ==
Time named "The Book of Us: The Demon" as one of ten albums defining "K-Pop's monumental year in 2020", citing "memorably penetrating lyrics" and its capacity "to make listeners feel less alone [in their own pain]". The South China Morning Post included the album among "the top 15 K-Pop group albums of 2020", describing it as "a soundtrack for life." NME ranked the album #19 on its list of "The 25 best Asian albums of 2020", calling it their "most cathartic and therapeutic material yet."

"Zombie" was named one of the top 10 singles of the year (among Korean artists) by IZM, a music critic site in South Korea. The group received the "Best Band Performance" award in the 2020 Mnet Asian Music Awards for the song.
