= The Best Day2 =

Compilation album by Day6
- Released: December 4, 2019
- Recorded: 2018–2019
- Genre: Pop rock; ballad
- Length: 54:46
- Language: Korean; English; Japanese
- Label: Warner Music Japan

Day6 chronology
The Book of Us: Entropy (2019)	The Best Day2 (2019)	The Book of Us: The Demon (2020)

Singles from The Best Day2
- 1. "Finale" Released: October 23, 2019

The Best Day2 is the second compilation album by South Korean band Day6, released on December 4, 2019, through Warner Music Japan. It compiles Korean tracks released between 2018 and 2019, the new Japanese songs "Finale" and "If You" as well as the Japanese versions of "Time of Our Life" and "Sweet Chaos".

== Promotion ==
The single "Finale" was released digitally on October 23, 2019, as a promotional track.

== Track listing ==
No.	Title	Writer(s)	Music	Length
1.	"Finale"	Young K; Komu	Sungjin; Young K; Kevin G. Cho; Jeon Da-sol; Bae Jae-seok	3:15
2.	"If You" (君なら)	Young K	Chailhun; Yue; Jeon Woo-seok; Young K; Wonpil	3:12
3.	"WARNING!"	Young K	Hong Ji-sang; Jae; Sungjin; Young K; Wonpil	3:25
4.	"Shoot Me"	Young K	Hong Ji-sang; Lee Woo-min "Collapsedone"; Jae; Sungjin; Young K; Wonpil	2:55
5.	"Somehow" (어쩌다 보니)	Young K	Hong Ji-sang; Lee Woo-min "Collapsedone"; Jae; Sungjin; Young K; Wonpil	3:22
6.	"Hurt Road" (아픈 길)	Young K	Jae; Sungjin; Young K; Wonpil; Hong Ji-sang	4:09
7.	"Days Gone By" (행복했던 날들이었다)	Young K	Jae; Sungjin; Young K; Wonpil; Hong Ji-sang	3:25
8.	"Beautiful Feeling"	Young K	Young K; Isaac Han; atomik	3:28
9.	"For Me"	Young K	Young K; Jae; Sungjin; Wonpil; Hong Ji-sang	3:28
10.	"Time of Our Life" (한 페이지가 될 수 있게)	Young K	Young K; Jae; Sungjin; Wonpil; Hong Ji-sang	3:26
11.	"Cover" (포장)	Sungjin; Young K	Sungjin; YoungK; Wonpil; mr.cho; Lee Min-gyeong	3:26
12.	"Sweet Chaos"	Young K	Jae; Sungjin; Young K; Wonpil; Hong Ji-sang	3:47
13.	"Rescue Me"	Young K; Wonpil	Jae; Wonpil; FRANTS	3:22
14.	"365247"	Young K	Young K; FRANTS	2:53
15.	"Time of Our Life" (Japanese Version)	Young K; Co-sho	Young K; Jae; Sungjin; Wonpil; Hong Ji-sang	3:26
16.	"Sweet Chaos" (Japanese Version)	Young K; Komu	Jae; Sungjin; Young K; Wonpil; Hong Ji-sang	3:47
Total length:				54:46

Limited edition DVD
No.	Title	Length
1.	"DAY6 2nd BEST ALBUM「THE BEST DAY2」Making Movie"
2.	"Shoot Me Music Video"
3.	"Beautiful Feeling Music Video"
4.	"Days Gone By Music Video"
5.	"Time of Our Life Music Video"
6.	"Sweet Chaos Music Video"
7.	"DAY6 WORLD TOUR 'GRAVITY' in SEOUL Making Movie"

Digital edition
No.	Title	Length
1.	"Finale"	3:15
2.	"If You"	3:12
3.	"Time of Our Life -Japanese ver.-"	3:26
4.	"Sweet Chaos -Japanese ver.-"	3:47
Total length:		13:40

== Charts ==
Chart (2019)	Peak position
Japanese Albums (Oricon)	23

== Sales ==
Country	Digital sales
Japan (Oricon)	4,893
