= Remember Us: Youth Part 2 =

Album by DAY6

EP by DAY6
- Released: December 10, 2018
- Genre: Pop rock; alternative rock
- Length: 23:58
- Language: Korean
- Label: JYP Entertainment; Studio J; IRIVER

DAY6 chronology
Unlock (2018)	Remember Us: Youth Part 2 (2018)	The Book of Us: Gravity (2019)

Singles from Remember Us: Youth Part 2
- 1. "Days Gone By" Released: December 10, 2018

Music video
- "days gone by" on YouTube

Remember Us: Youth Part 2 is the fourth extended play by South Korean band DAY6. It was released by JYP Entertainment on December 10, 2018.

== Background and release ==
Following the release of Shoot Me: Youth Part 1 on June 26, 2018, it was announced that the second part would most likely be released by the end of the year. On November 23, it was revealed that the EP, entitled Remember Us: Youth Part 2, would be available on December 10.

The track list was released on November 26, 2018. Two days later, motion posters of each members were released. Solo teasers of Sungjin, Jae, Young K, Wonpil and Dowoon were unveiled on a daily basis from November 29 to December 3 at 12AM (KST).

Group and unit teaser images were published on December 4. Two music video teasers were revealed on December 5 and 6 respectively. The online cover was released the following day. On December 8, an album sampler was made available on Youtube. On December 10, the EP was released, along with the music video for "days gone by".

== Promotion ==
On December 10, 2018, three hours after the album's release, a "Comeback Show" was broadcast live on Naver's V LIVE broadcasting site featuring Day6 presenting their new songs.

Day6 held their comeback stage on KBS2's Music Bank on December 14 and promoted "days gone by" on several music programs in South Korea, including Show! Music Core and Inkigayo.

== Track listing ==
No.	Title	Lyrics	Music	Arrangement	Length
1.	"아픈 길" (Hurt Road)	Young K	Jae; Sungjin; Young K; Wonpil; Hong Ji-sang	Hong Ji-sang	4:09
2.	"행복했던 날들이었다" (days gone by)	Young K	Jae; Sungjin; Young K; Wonpil; Hong Ji-sang	Hong Ji-sang	3:25
3.	"두통" (Headache)	Young K; Jae	Jae; Sungjin; Young K; Wonpil; Hong Ji-sang	Hong Ji-sang	2:57
4.	"121U"	Young K	Jae; Sungjin; Young K; Wonpil; Lee Woo-min `Collapsedone`; Hong Ji-sang	Lee Woo-min `Collapsedone`; Hong Ji-sang	3:14
5.	"완전 멋지잖아" (So Cool)	Young K	Jae; Sungjin; Young K; Wonpil; Hong Ji-sang	Hong Ji-sang	3:05
6.	"마라톤" (Marathon)	Young K; mr.cho	Young K; Wonpil; mr.cho	mr.cho	3:40
7.	"Beautiful Feeling"	Young K	Young K; Isaac Han; atomik	Isaac Han; atomik	3:28
Total length:					23:58

Physical edition
No.	Title	Music	Arrangement	Length
8.	"행복했던 날들이었다" (Instrumental)	Hong Ji-sang	Hong Ji-sang	3:25
Total length:				27:23

== Charts ==
Chart (2018)	Peak position
French Digital Albums (SNEP)	139
South Korean Albums (Gaon)	3
US World Albums (Billboard)	10

=== Singles ===
"Days Gone By"

Chart	Peak position
US World Digital Song Sales (Billboard)	25

== Release history ==
Country	Date	Format	Label
South Korea	December 10, 2018	CD, digital download, streaming	JYP Entertainment, IRIVER
Worldwide	December 10, 2018	Digital download, streaming	JYP Entertainment, IRIVER
