= The Book of Us: Gravity =

Album by DAY6

EP by Day6
- Released: July 15, 2019
- Genre: Pop rock
- Length: 21:01
- Language: Korean
- Label: JYP Entertainment; Studio J

Day6 chronology
Remember Us: Youth Part 2 (2018)	The Book of Us: Gravity (2019)	The Book of Us: Entropy (2019)

Singles from The Book of Us: Gravity
- 1. "Time of Our Life" Released: July 15, 2019

Music video
- "Time of Our Life" on YouTube

The Book of Us: Gravity is the fifth extended play by South Korean band Day6. It was released by JYP Entertainment on July 15, 2019.

== Background and release ==
Following the end of Day6's second fan meeting in Seoul, a prologue film entitled The Book of Us was released on YouTube on June 30 at midnight (KST). The EP was announced the following day with Gravity marking the beginning of the new era following the end of the Youth series in 2018. Pre-orders for the physical album opened on July 1, it will be available in two versions: "Soul" and "Mate". The track list, which contains six new tracks, was released on July 3. All members except Dowoon participated in the composition on the songs. Young K wrote all the lyrics himself except for "Cover" which he co-wrote with bandmate Sungjin. On July 5, individual "artwork images" were released every 15 minutes from midnight to 1:00 AM. Details on the physical album were revealed later that morning. Individual teaser images were released from July 6–10, followed by a group teaser image on July 11. The first music video teaser for the lead single "Time of Our Life" was released on July 12 and an album sampler was revealed the following day. The EP was released on July 15 along with the music video for "Time of Our Life".

== Promotions ==
Day6 held a "Comeback Live Talk" on July 15 on Naver's V LIVE broadcasting site. They held their comeback stage on Mnet's M Countdown on July 18 and promoted "Time of Our Life" on several music programs in South Korea, including Music Bank, Show! Music Core and Inkigayo.

The band promoted their new EP during their second world tour, starting in Seoul on August 9, 2019.

== Track listing ==
Adapted from the group's official website.

No.	Title	Lyrics	Music	Arrangement	Length
1.	"For Me"	Young K	Young K; Jae; Sungjin; Wonpil; Hong Ji-sang	Hong Ji-sang	3:28
2.	"Time of Our Life" (한 페이지가 될 수 있게)	Young K	Young K; Jae; Sungjin; Wonpil; Hong Ji-sang	Hong Ji-sang	3:26
3.	"How to Love"	Young K	Young K; Jae; Sungjin; Wonpil; Hong Ji-sang	Hong Ji-sang	3:24
4.	"Wanna Go Back" (돌아갈래요)	Young K	Young K; Jae; 220	220	3:36
5.	"Cover" (포장)	Sungjin; Young K	Sungjin; YoungK; Wonpil; mr.cho; Lee Min-gyeong	mr.cho	3:26
6.	"Best Part"	Young K	Young K; Jae; Sungjin; Wonpil; Hong Ji-sang	Hong Ji-sang	3:41
Total length:					21:11

== Charts ==
Chart (2019)	Peak position
French Digital Albums (SNEP)	85
South Korean Albums (Gaon)	1
US World Albums (Billboard)	9

== Accolades ==
Year-end lists
Critic/Publication	List	Song	Rank	Ref.
MTV	The Best K-pop B-sides of 2019	"Wanna Go Back"	4	

=== Music programs ===
Song	Program	Date	Ref.
"Time of Our Life"	Show Champion (MBC Music)	July 24, 2019	
"Time of Our Life"	M Countdown (Mnet)	July 25, 2019	

== Release history ==
Region	Date	Format	Label
South Korea	July 15, 2019	CD; digital download; streaming	JYP Entertainment; Studio J
Various	July 15, 2019	Digital download; streaming	JYP Entertainment; Studio J

== See also ==
- List of Gaon Album Chart number ones of 2019
