= Wonpil =

South Korean musician (born 1994)

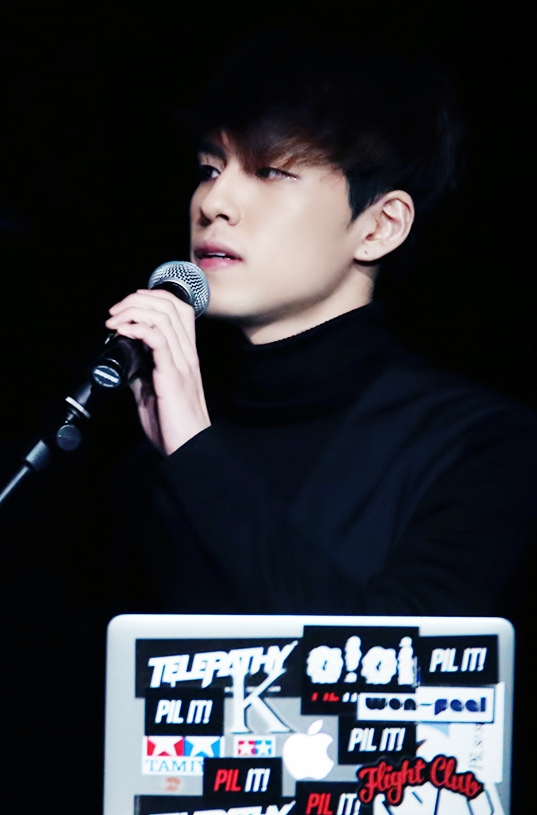
- Kim in 2016
- Born: Kim Won-pil; April 28, 1994 (age 32); Incheon, South Korea
- Musical career
- Genres: K-pop; rock; pop
- Occupations: Singer; musician
- Instruments: Vocals; keyboards; synthesizers
- Years active: 2015–present
- Label: JYP
- Member of: Day6; JYP Nation; Even of Day

Korean name
- Hangul: 김원필
- RR: Gim Wonpil
- MR: Kim Wŏnp'il

Kim Won-pil (Korean: 김원필; born April 28, 1994), known mononymously as Wonpil, is a South Korean singer and musician. He is the keyboardist of pop rock band Day6 and its sub unit Even of Day under JYP Entertainment. His debut album Pilmography debuted at number one on the Gaon Album Chart in February 2022.

== Early life ==
Wonpil was born in Incheon, South Korea. His parents run a piano academy so he was familiar with piano since a young age, and he learned how to play it by himself.

== Career ==
After signing with JYP Entertainment, Wonpil was part of JYP trainees' dance team with Young K, but was later chosen to be part of the company's first band, and, together with Jae, Young K, Sungjin and Junhyeok, he formed the acoustic ensemble 5LIVE.

In 2014, he appeared in the program WIN: Who Is Next?, which saw the trainees of JYPE and YG Entertainment compete against each others. In 2015, after the joining of sixth member Dowoon, Wonpil eventually debuted as a member of rock band Day6 on September 7, in which he plays the synthesizer and the keyboard.

In August 2020, JYP Entertainment announced that Wonpil, along with DAY6's member Young K and Dowoon, would debut as the first sub-unit Even of Day. He and Young K made a short appearance in web series Let Me Off The Earth in October; then in November, he appeared in BOL4's new music video "Dancing Cartoon".

In March 2021, Wonpil made his musical theatre debut in Midnight Sun, produced by Shinswave. After finishing the musical, it was reported that he was in talks to star in web drama Best Mistake 3, and in October, the news was confirmed.

On December 8, Wonpil featured in Korean indie duo 1415 title song "naps!" from the EP of the same name. On the same day, it was reported that he was preparing his solo debut for early 2022. Later JYPE confirmed releasing his first studio album, Pilmography, on February 7, 2022.

On January 24, 2022, JYPE began promoting Wonpil's solo debut with a mood film and the lead single title, "Voiceless". The voice track list, concept photos, interview film, teasers of the music video and live album sampler video were released respectively.

On February 28, 2022, it was confirmed that Wonpil will expand the first solo concert by two more rounds, including the day before the military enlistment.

== Personal life ==
On February 23, 2022, Wonpil announced that he would be serving in the Republic of Korea Navy, and would enlist in the military on March 28, 2022. On October 31, 2023, Wonpil was discharged from military service without further requirement for return.

== Discography ==
=== Studio albums ===
Title	Album details	Peak chart positions	Sales
Title	Album details	KOR	Sales
Pilmography	Released: February 7, 2022; Label: JYP Entertainment; Formats: CD, digital download, streaming	1	KOR; 51,355

=== Extended plays ===
Title	EP details	Peak chart positions	Sales
Title	EP details	KOR	Sales
Unpiltered	Released: March 30, 2026; Label: JYP Entertainment; Formats: CD, digital download, streaming	3	KOR; 172,492

=== Singles ===
Title	Year	Peak chart positions	Album
Title	Year	KOR	Album
"Voiceless" (안녕, 잘 가)	2022	162	Pilmography
"You Were Beautiful" (예뻤어)	2022	—	Non-album singles
"Slightly Tipsy" (취기를 빌려)	2022	—	Non-album singles
"On Rainy Days" (비가 오는 날엔) (with Yang Yo-seob, Son Dong-woon)	2022	—	Non-album singles
"Highs and Lows" (사랑병동)	2026	62	Unpiltered
"—" denotes releases that did not chart.

=== Other releases ===
Title	Year	Peak chart positions	Album
Title	Year	KOR	Album
As featured artist
"Love Song!" (사랑노래) (The Blank Shop featuring Wonpil)	2020	—	Tailor
"Wedding Song" (축_가) (J_ust featuring Wonpil)	2020	—	Non-album singles
"naps!" (1415 featuring Wonpil)	2021	—	Non-album singles
Soundtrack appearances
"Did You Wake Up?" (일어났어?) (with Hello Ga-Young)	2020	— (Note: "Did You Wake Up?" did not enter the Gaon Digital Chart, but peaked at number 53 and 142 on the Gaon BGM Chart and the Gaon Download Chart, respectively.)	One of a Kind Romance OST
"Meet Me When the Sun Goes Down" (태양이 지면 널 만나러 갈게)	2021	— (Note: "Meet Me When the Sun Goes Down" did not enter the Gaon Digital Chart, but peaked at number 74 and 147 on the Gaon BGM Chart and the Gaon Download Chart, respectively.)	Midnight Sun OST Part. 2
"Good-Bye Days" (with Lovelyz' Kei)	2021	—	Midnight Sun OST Part. 2
"Like a Fire"	2022	— (Note: "Like a Fire" did not enter the Gaon Digital Chart, but peaked at number 181 on the Gaon Download Chart.)	Best Mistake OST Part. 2
"After" (시간의 잔상)	2024	—	A Not So Fairy Tale OST
Other charted songs
"A Journey" (행운을 빌어 줘)	2022	128	Pilmography
"Toxic Love"	2026	130	Unpiltered
"Already Grown Up" (어른이 되어 버렸다)	2026	133	Unpiltered
"Up All Night"	2026	144	Unpiltered
"Step by Step"	2026	146	Unpiltered
"Hold My Love" (백만송이는 아니지만)	2026	140	Unpiltered
"Piano" (피아노)	2026	145	Unpiltered
"—" denotes releases that did not chart.

=== Song credits ===
All credits are listed under the Korea Music Copyright Association (KOMCA) unless otherwise stated.

Year 2015
Title	Artist	Album	Writing	Composing	Arrangement	Notes
"Free하게" (Freely)	Day6	The Day	Yes	Yes	No	
"이상하게 계속 이래" (Out Of My Mind)	Day6	The Day	Yes	Yes	No	
"Congratulations"	Day6	The Day	Yes	Yes	No	
"버릇이 됐어" (Habits)	Day6	The Day	Yes	Yes	Yes	
"태양처럼" (Like That Sun)	Day6	The Day	Yes	No	No	
"Colors"	Day6	The Day	Yes	Yes	No	
"You"	Day6	Non-album singles	Yes	Yes	No	2015 Day6 1st Live Concert [D-Day]
"길터"	Day6	Non-album singles	No	Yes	No	2015 Day6 1st Live Concert [D-Day]
"Eyeless"	Day6	Non-album singles	Yes	Yes	No	2015 Day6 1st Live Concert [D-Day]
"Pandora"	Day6	Non-album singles	Yes	Yes	No	2015 Day6 1st Live Concert [D-Day]

Year 2016
Title	Artist	Album	Writing	Composing	Arrangement	Notes
"First Time"	Day6	Daydream	Yes	Yes	No	
"Letting Go" (놓아 놓아 놓아)	Day6	Daydream	Yes	Yes	No	
"Sing Me"	Day6	Daydream	Yes	Yes	No	
"Wish" (바래)	Day6	Daydream	Yes	Yes	No	
"Hunt"	Day6	Daydream	Yes	Yes	No	2015 Day6 1st Live Concert [D-Day]
"I Can"	Day6	non-album single	Yes	Yes	No	Day6 Live Concert "Dream"
"Stuck On You" (빠져가지고)	Up10tion	Burst	Yes	Yes	Yes	

Year 2017
Title	Artist	Album	Writing	Composing	Arrangement	Notes
"Lean On Me" (오늘은 내게)	Day6	Sunrise	Yes	Yes	No	
"I Smile" (반드시 웃는다)	Day6	Sunrise	Yes	Yes	No	
"Man In A Movie"	Day6	Sunrise	No	Yes	No	
"I Wait" (아 왜)	Day6	Sunrise	No	Yes	No	
"How Can I Say" (어떻게 말해)	Day6	Sunrise	Yes	Yes	No	
"Letting Go" (놓아 놓아 놓아; Rebooted Version)	Day6	Sunrise	Yes	Yes	No	
"I Would" (그럴 텐데)	Day6	Sunrise	No	Yes	No	
"I'm Serious" (장난 아닌데)	Day6	Sunrise	Yes	Yes	No	
"Say Wow"	Day6	Sunrise	No	Yes	No	
"Dance Dance"	Day6	Sunrise	No	Yes	No	
"My Day"	Day6	Sunrise	No	Yes	Yes	
"You Were Beautiful" (예뻤어)	Day6	Sunrise	No	Yes	No	
"Better Better"	Day6	Moonrise	No	Yes	No	
"I Like You" (좋아합니다)	Day6	Moonrise	No	Yes	No	
"What Can I Do" (좋은걸 뭐 어떡해)	Day6	Moonrise	No	Yes	No	
"I'll Remember" (남겨둘게)	Day6	Moonrise	No	Yes	No	
"Whatever!" (놀래!)	Day6	Moonrise	No	Yes	No	
"Hi Hello"	Day6	Moonrise	No	Yes	No	
"I Loved You"	Day6	Moonrise	No	Yes	No	
"When You Love Someone" (그렇더라고요)	Day6	Moonrise	No	Yes	No	
"All Alone" (혼자야)	Day6	Moonrise	No	Yes	No	
"Pouring" (쏟아진다)	Day6	Moonrise	No	Yes	No	
"I'll Try" (노력해볼게요)	Day6	Moonrise	Yes	Yes	No	

Year 2018
Title	Artist	Album	Writing	Composing	Arrangement	Notes
"Warning!"	Day6	Shoot Me: Youth Part 1	No	Yes	No	
"Shoot Me"	Day6	Shoot Me: Youth Part 1	No	Yes	No	
"어쩌다 보니" (Somehow)	Day6	Shoot Me: Youth Part 1	No	Yes	No	
"Feeling Good"	Day6	Shoot Me: Youth Part 1	No	Yes	No	
"혼잣말" (Talking to)	Day6	Shoot Me: Youth Part 1	No	Yes	No	
"원하니까" (Still)	Day6	Shoot Me: Youth Part 1	No	Yes	No	
"Stop The Rain"	Day6	Unlock	No	Yes	No	
"Say Hello"	Day6	Unlock	No	Yes	No	
"I Just"	Day6	Unlock	No	Yes	No	
"Nobody Knows"	Day6	Unlock	Yes	No	No	
"Falling"	Day6	Unlock	Yes	Yes	No	
"If ~また逢えたら~" (If -Mata Aetara-)	Day6	Unlock	No	Yes	No	
"Chocolate"	Day6	Want More 19 OST	Yes	Yes	No	
"아픈 길" (Hurt Road)	Day6	Remember Us: Youth Part 2	No	Yes	No	
"행복했던 날들이었다" (Days Gone By)	Day6	Remember Us: Youth Part 2	No	Yes	No	
"두통" (Headache)	Day6	Remember Us: Youth Part 2	No	Yes	No	
"121U"	Day6	Remember Us: Youth Part 2	No	Yes	No	
"완전 멋지잖아" (So Cool)	Day6	Remember Us: Youth Part 2	No	Yes	No	
"마라톤" (Marathon)	Day6	Remember Us: Youth Part 2	No	Yes	No	

Year 2019
Title	Artist	Album	Writing	Composing	Arrangement	Notes
"Good Night"	Jeong Se-woon	Touch Your Heart OST	Yes	Yes	No	
"For Me"	Day6	The Book of Us: Gravity	No	Yes	No	
"Time of Our Life" (한 페이지가 될 수 있게)	Day6	The Book of Us: Gravity	No	Yes	No	
"How to Love"	Day6	The Book of Us: Gravity	No	Yes	No	
"Cover" (포장)	Day6	The Book of Us: Gravity	No	Yes	No	
"Best Part"	Day6	The Book of Us: Gravity	No	Yes	No	
"Deep in Love"	Day6	The Book of Us: Entropy	No	Yes	No	
"Sweet Chaos"	Day6	The Book of Us: Entropy	No	Yes	No	
"Rescue Me"	Day6	The Book of Us: Entropy	Yes	Yes	No	
"Not Fine"	Day6	The Book of Us: Entropy	No	Yes	No	
"Not Mine"	Day6	The Book of Us: Entropy	Yes	Yes	No	
"Like a Flowing Wind" (마치 흘러가는 바람처럼)	Day6	The Book of Us: Entropy	Yes	Yes	No	
"If You" (君なら)	Day6	The Best Day2	No	Yes	No	

Year 2020
Title	Artist	Album	Writing	Composing	Arrangement	Notes
"Day and Night" (해와 달처럼)	Day6	The Book of Us: The Demon	No	Yes	No	
"Zombie"	Day6	The Book of Us: The Demon	Yes	No	No	
"Tick Tock"	Day6	The Book of Us: The Demon	No	Yes	No	
"Love Me or Leave Me"	Day6	The Book of Us: The Demon	No	Yes	No	
"Stop" (때려쳐)	Day6	The Book of Us: The Demon	No	Yes	No	
"1 to 10"	Day6	The Book of Us: The Demon	No	Yes	No	
"Zombie" (English Ver.)	Day6	The Book of Us: The Demon	Yes	No	No	
"Landed" (그렇게 너에게 도착하였다)	Day6 (Even of Day)	The Book of Us: Gluon	No	Yes	Yes	
"Where The Sea Sleeps" (파도가 끝나는 곳까지)	Day6 (Even of Day)	The Book of Us: Gluon	No	Yes	Yes	
"Thanks to" (땡스 투)	Day6 (Even of Day)	The Book of Us: Gluon	Yes	Yes	Yes	
"To Be Continued -Outro- (Sung by Denimalz 3)"	Day6 (Even of Day)	The Book of Us: Gluon	No	Yes	Yes	

Year 2021
Title	Artist	Album	Writing	Composing	Arrangement	Notes
"사랑, 이게 맞나 봐" (So This is Love)	Day6	bimil:ier vol.1	No	Yes	No	
"Everyday We Fight"	Day6	The Book of Us: Negentropy	Yes	No	No	
"You Make Me"	Day6	The Book of Us: Negentropy	No	Yes	No	
"Healer"	Day6	The Book of Us: Negentropy	No	Yes	No	
"Only" (둘도 아닌 하나)	Day6	The Book of Us: Negentropy	No	Yes	No	
"Above the Clouds"	Day6	The Book of Us: Negentropy	No	Yes	No	
"One" (무적)	Day6	The Book of Us: Negentropy	Yes	Yes	No	
"우린" (We)	Day6 (Even of Day)	Right Through Me	No	Yes	No	
"뚫고 지나가요" (Right Through Me)	Day6 (Even of Day)	Right Through Me	No	Yes	No	
"역대급" (WALK)	Day6 (Even of Day)	Right Through Me	No	Yes	No	
"네가 원했던 것들" (All The Things You Wanted)	Day6 (Even of Day)	Right Through Me	No	Yes	No	
"비극의 결말에서" (From the Ending of a Tragedy)	Day6 (Even of Day)	Right Through Me	No	Yes	No	
"나 홀로 집에" (Home Alone)	Day6 (Even of Day)	Right Through Me	Yes	Yes	No	
"Love Parade"	Day6 (Even of Day)	Right Through Me	Yes	Yes	No	
"낙하산은 펴지 않을게요" (Diving to the top)	The Wild Idol	—N/a	Yes	Yes	No	For the group from the survival show, Extreme Debut: Wild Idol

Year 2022
Title	Artist	Album	Writing	Composing	Arrangement	Notes
"안녕, 잘 가" (Voiceless)	Wonpil	Pilmography	Yes	Yes	No	
"지우게" (Sincerity)	Wonpil	Pilmography	Yes	Yes	No	
"소설 속의 작가가 되어" (A Writer in a Love Story)	Wonpil	Pilmography	Yes	Yes	No	
"우리더 걸을까" (Walk with Me)	Wonpil	Pilmography	Yes	No	No	
"외딴섬의 외톨이" (Stranded)	Wonpil	Pilmography	Yes	Yes	No	
"언젠가 봄은 찾아올 거야" (Someday, Spring Will Come)	Wonpil	Pilmography	Yes	No	No	
"휴지조각" (Pieces)	Wonpil	Pilmography	Yes	Yes	No	
"늦은 끝" (Last Goodbye)	Wonpil	Pilmography	Yes	Yes	No	
"그리다 보면" (Unpainted Canvas)	Wonpil	Pilmography	Yes	Yes	No	
"행운을 빌어 줘" (A Journey)	Wonpil	Pilmography	Yes	Yes	No	
"해변의달링" (Darling on the Beach)	Day6 (Even of Day)	Non-album singles	No	Yes	No	

Year 2024
Title	Artist	Album	Writing	Composing	Arrangement	Notes
"Welcome To The Show"	Day6	Fourever	No	Yes	No	
"Happy"	Day6	Fourever	No	Yes	No	
"The Power of Love"	Day6	Fourever	No	Yes	No	
"널 제외한 나의 뇌" (Get the Hell Out)	Day6	Fourever	No	Yes	No	
"나만 슬픈 엔딩" (Sad Ending)	Day6	Fourever	Yes	Yes	No	
"사랑하게 해주라" (Let Me Love You)	Day6	Fourever	No	Yes	No	
"그게 너의 사랑인지 몰랐어" (Didn't Know)	Day6	Fourever	Yes	Yes	No	
"괴물" (Monster)	Day6	Band Aid	No	Yes	No	
"녹아내려요" (Melt Down)	Day6	Band Aid	No	Yes	No	
"그녀가 웃었다" (She Smiled)	Day6	Band Aid	Yes	Yes	No	
"망겜" (Shxtty Game)	Day6	Band Aid	No	Yes	No	
"도와줘요 Rock&Roll" (Help Me Rock&Roll)	Day6	Band Aid	Yes	Yes	No	
"Counter"	Day6	Band Aid	No	Yes	No	
"I'm Fine"	Day6	Band Aid	Yes	Yes	No	
"아직 거기 살아" (Still There)	Day6	Band Aid	No	Yes	No	

Year 2025
Title	Artist	Album	Writing	Composing	Arrangement	Notes
"Maybe Tomorrow"	Day6	Non-album singles	No	Yes	No	
"끝났지" (Game Over)	Day6	Non-album singles	No	Yes	No	

== Filmography ==
=== Web series ===
Year	Title	Role	Notes	Ref.
2020	Let Me Off the Earth	Member of school's band Insumnia	Cameo (episode 7); with Young K	
2021	Best Mistake 3	Do Ye-seok	Lead role	

=== Music video appearances ===
Year	Song Title	Artist	Ref.
2020	"Dancing Cartoon"	BOL4	
2021	"naps!"	1415	
2022	"Voiceless"	Wonpil	

=== Television show ===
Year	Title	Role	Notes	Ref.
2019	King of Mask Singer	Contestant	As Pager mask	

=== Musical theatre ===
Year	English title	Korean title	Role	Ref.
2021	Midnight Sun	태양의 노래	Ha-ram	

== Concerts ==
=== Wonpil Solo Concert "Pilmography" (2022) ===
==== Set list ====
Yes24 Live Hall (Day 1)
1. A Writer in a Love Story
2. Stranded
3. Someday, Spring Will Come
4. Walk With Me
5. Through the Night (cover)
6. I'm Serious
7. Days Gone By
8. Why? (cover)
9. Last Goodbye
10. Pieces
11. Like a Flowing Wind
12. Unpainted Canvas
13. You Were Beautiful
14. Sincerity
15. Voiceless
16. So, This is Love
17. Smiling Angel (cover)
18. Time of Our Life
19. A Journey
Yes24 Live Hall (Day 2)
1. A Writer in a Love Story
2. Stranded
3. Someday, Spring Will Come
4. Walk With Me
5. What's the Matter? (cover)
6. Don't Forget (cover)
7. Days Gone By
8. I'm Serious
9. Last Goodbye
10. Pieces
11. Like a Flowing Wind
12. Unpainted Canvas
13. You Were Beautiful
14. Sincerity
15. Voiceless
16. So, This is Love
17. Smiling Angel (cover)
18. Time of Our Life
19. A Journey
Yes24 Live Hall (Beyond LIVE) (Day 3)
1. A Writer in a Love Story
2. Stranded
3. Someday, Spring Will Come
4. Walk With Me
5. Two People (cover)
6. I'm Serious
7. Days Gone By
8. What's the Matter? (cover)
9. Last Goodbye
10. Pieces
11. Like a Flowing Wind
12. Unpainted Canvas
13. You Were Beautiful
14. Sincerity
15. Voiceless
16. So, This is Love
17. Smiling Angel (cover)
18. Time of Our Life
19. A Journey
Kwangwoon University (Day 1)
1. A Writer in a Love Story
2. Stranded
3. Someday, Spring Will Come
4. Walk With Me
5. Love Song
6. After This Night (cover)
7. I'm Serious
8. Days Gone By
9. Last Goodbye
10. Pieces
11. Like a Flowing Wind
12. Unpainted Canvas
13. You Were Beautiful
14. Sincerity
15. Voiceless
16. So, This is Love
17. Smiling Angel (cover)
18. Time of Our Life
19. A Journey
Kwangwoon University (Beyond LIVE) (Day 2)
1. A Writer in a Love Story
2. Stranded
3. Someday, Spring Will Come
4. Walk With Me
5. All About You (cover)
6. After This Night (cover)
7. I'm Serious
8. Days Gone By
9. Last Goodbye
10. Pieces
11. Like a Flowing Wind
12. Unpainted Canvas
13. You Were Beautiful
14. Sincerity
15. Voiceless
16. So, This is Love
17. Smiling Angel (cover)
18. Time of Our Life
19. A Journey

==== Concert dates ====
Date	City	Country	Venue / Platform
March 11, 2022	Seoul	South Korea	Yes24 Live Hall
March 12, 2022	Seoul	South Korea	Yes24 Live Hall
March 13, 2022	Seoul	South Korea	Yes24 Live Hall, Beyond LIVE
March 26, 2022	Seoul	South Korea	Kwangwoon University
March 27, 2022	Seoul	South Korea	Kwangwoon University, Beyond LIVE
