= Xdinary Heroes discography =

- Studio albums: 1
- EPs: 9

South Korean band Xdinary Heroes has released one studio album and nine extended plays.

== Studio albums ==
List of studio albums, showing selected details, selected chart positions, and sales figures
Title	Details	Peak chart positions	Sales
Title	Details	KOR	Sales
Troubleshooting	Released: April 30, 2024; Label: Studio J, JYP; Formats: CD, digital download, streaming	10	KOR: 97,732

== Extended plays ==
List of extended plays, showing selected details, selected chart positions, and sales figures
Title	Details	Peak chart positions							Sales
Title	Details	KOR	HUN	JPN	POL	US Heat.	US Sales	US World	Sales
Hello, World!	Released: July 20, 2022; Label: Studio J, JYP; Formats: CD, digital download, streaming	4	—	—	28	—	—	—	KOR: 65,494
Overload	Released: November 11, 2022; Label: Studio J, JYP; Formats: CD, digital download, streaming	5	—	—	41	19	74	14	KOR: 82,469
Deadlock	Released: April 26, 2023; Label: Studio J, JYP; Formats: CD, digital download, streaming	8	39	—	—	—	—	—	KOR: 131,871
Livelock	Released: October 11, 2023; Label: Studio J, JYP; Formats: CD, digital download, streaming	7	—	—	49	—	—	—	KOR: 99,402
Live and Fall	Released: October 14, 2024; Label: Studio J, JYP; Formats: CD, digital download, streaming	8	—	—	—	—	—	—	KOR: 97,048
Beautiful Mind	Released: March 24, 2025; Label: Studio J, JYP; Formats: CD, digital download, streaming	4	—	—	—	—	—	—	KOR: 105,096
Lxve to Death	Released: October 24, 2025; Label: Studio J, JYP; Formats: CD, digital download, streaming	8	—	—	—	—	—	13	KOR: 109,325
Dead And	Released: April 17, 2026; Label: Studio J, JYP; Formats: CD, digital download, streaming	8	—	42	—	—	—	8	KOR: 182,122; JPN: 1,136
Impulse	Released: October 12, 2026; Label: Studio J, JYP; Formats: CD, digital download, streaming	7	—	—	—	—	—	—	KOR: 137,590
"—" denotes releases that did not chart or were not released in that region.

== Singles ==
List of singles, showing year released, selected chart positions, and name of the album
Title	Year	Peak chart positions		Album
Title	Year	KOR Down.	US World	Album
"Happy Death Day"	2021	—	12	Non-album single
"Test Me"	2022	187	—	Hello, World!
"Strawberry Cake"	2022	—	—	Hello, World!
"Hair Cut"	2022	124	—	Overload
"Freakin' Bad"	2023	85	—	Deadlock
"Break the Brake"	2023	98	—	Livelock
"Dreaming Girl" (꿈을 꾸는 소녀)	2024	93	—	Troubleshooting
"Little Things" (어리고 부끄럽고 바보 같은)	2024	73	—	Troubleshooting
"Boy Comics" (소년만화)	2024	109	—	Live and Fall
"Love and Fear"	2024	114	—	Live and Fall
"Save Me"	2024	84	—	Live and Fall
"Instead!" (featuring Yoon Do-hyun)	2024	115	—	Live and Fall
"Night Before the End"	2024	50	—	Live and Fall
"Beautiful Life"	2025	25	—	Beautiful Mind
"Fire (My Sweet Misery)"	2025	106	—	Lxve to Death
"ICU"	2025	59	—	Lxve to Death
"X Room"	2026	77	—	Dead And
"Voyager"	2026	98	—	Dead And
"—" denotes releases that did not chart or were not released in that region.

== Soundtrack appearances ==
Title	Year	Peak chart positions	Album
Title	Year	KOR Down.	Album
"Wego Wego"	2024	—	Wego Wego (Killer Peter X Xdinary Heroes)
"Addiction (Prod. Czaer)"	2024	61	Stage Fighter (STF) Original Vol. 5
"Break the Darkness"	2025	197	The Nice Guy (Original Television Soundtrack), Pt.1 - Single

== Music videos ==
Title	Year	Director(s)	Ref.
"Happy Death Day"	2021	725 (SL8 Visual Lab)	
"Test Me"	2022	725 (SL8 Visual Lab)	
"Strawberry Cake"	2022	725 (SL8 Visual Lab)	
"Hair Cut"	2022	725 (SL8 Visual Lab)	
"Freakin' Bad"	2023	725 (SL8 Visual Lab)	
"Good Enough"	2023	Yoo Chung	
"Dear H."	2023	Yoo Chung	
"Break The Break"	2023	Bang Jae-yeob	
"PLUTO"	2023	Unknown	
"Little Things"	2024	Novvkim	
"Boy Comics"	2024	INSP (Koinrush)	
"Love and Fear"	2024	INSP (Koinrush)	
"Save Me"	2024	SUIKO (Koinrush)	
"Instead!"	2024	SUIKO (Koinrush)	
"Night Before The End"	2024	Novvkim	
"Beautiful Life"	2025	Novvkim	
"Fire (My Sweet Misery)"	2025	SUIKO, INSP (Koinrush)	
"ICU"	2025	SUIKO (Koinrush)	
"Lost and Found"	2025	Annie Chung	
"X room"	2026	Jinyu	
"Voyager"	2026	SUIKO (Koinrush)	

== Other charted songs ==
List of other charted songs, showing year released, selected chart positions, and name of the album
Title	Year	Peak chart positions	Album
Title	Year	KOR Down.	Album
"Zzz.." (잠꼬대)	2022	153	Overload
"Ghost"	2022	162	Overload
"Crack in the Mirror"	2022	164	Overload
"Lunatic"	2022	165	Overload
"X-Mas"	2022	167	Overload
"Come into My Head"	2023	104	Deadlock
"Bicycle"	2023	103	Deadlock
"Checkmate"	2023	102	Deadlock
"Man in the Box"	2023	106	Deadlock
"Good Enough"	2023	101	Deadlock
"Dear H."	2023	108	Deadlock
"PLUTO"	2023	136	Livelock
"Freddy"	2023	139	Livelock
"Again? Again!"	2023	140	Livelock
"Bad Chemical"	2023	141	Livelock
"Enemy"	2023	142	Livelock
"Paranoid"	2023	143	Livelock
"Night of Fireworks" (불꽃놀이의 밤)	2024	96	Troubleshooting
"No Matter"	2024	98	Troubleshooting
"Undefined"	2024	99	Troubleshooting
"Money on My Mind"	2024	100	Troubleshooting
"Paint It"	2024	102	Troubleshooting
"Until the End of Time"	2024	103	Troubleshooting
"Walking to the Moon"	2024	104	Troubleshooting
"Moneyball"	2024	105	Troubleshooting
"XYMPHONY"	2024	94	Live and Fall
"FEELING NICE"	2024	99	Live and Fall
"XH_WORLD_75"	2024	110	Live and Fall
"George the Lobster"	2025	31	Beautiful Mind
"FIGHT ME"	2025	32	Beautiful Mind
"More than I like"	2025	33	Beautiful Mind
"BBB (Bitter but Better)"	2025	34	Beautiful Mind
"Supernatural"	2025	35	Beautiful Mind
"Diamond"	2025	36	Beautiful Mind
"Lost and Found"	2025	83	Lxve to Death
"Ashes to Ashes"	2025	89	Lxve to Death
"Spoiler! ! !"	2025	95	Lxve to Death
"Love Tug of War"	2025	87	Lxve to Death
"LOVE ME 2 DEATH"	2025	94	Lxve to Death
"Helium Balloon"	2026	162	Dead And
"No Cool Kids Zone"	2026	171	Dead And
"Hurt So Good"	2026	166	Dead And
"Rise High Rise"	2026	170	Dead And
"KTM"	2026	169	Dead And
"—" denotes a recording that did not chart or was not released in that territory

== Guest appearances ==
List of guest appearances, showing year released, other performing artists, and album name
Title	Year	Other artist(s)	Peak chart positions	Album
Title	Year	Other artist(s)	KOR DL	Album
"Rebellion" (feat. Xdinary Heroes)	2025	YB	57	Non-album single

== Other appearances ==
Title	Year	Album
"Seoul's Maternal Love" (서울의 모정)	2022	Immortal Songs: Singing the Legend (Patti Kim – Part 3)
"Why do you call me?" (왜 불러)	2023	Immortal Songs: Singing the Legend (Song Chang-sik– Part 1)
"Forbidden Love" (금지된 사랑)	2024	Immortal Songs: Singing the Legend (Kim Kyung-ho)

== See also ==
- JYP Entertainment discography
