= Kawaii Kaiwai =

2025 single by PiKi

Single by PiKi
- Released: September 3, 2025
- Genre: J-pop
- Label: Sony Music Entertainment Japan
- Songwriter: Yasutaka Nakata
- Producer: Yasutaka Nakata

"Kawaii Kaiwai" (lit. "Cute Community") is a song performed by Japanese idol duo PiKi and produced by Yasutaka Nakata. The song was released as the ending theme of the second season of the anime adaptation of My Dress-Up Darling. It was released in September 2025 and reached the top ten on the Oricon Singles Chart, Oricon Combined Singles Chart, and Billboard Japan Hot Animation chart, as well as the top 20 on the Billboard Japan Hot 100.

"Kawaii Kaiwai" generated public interest after the ending animation that the song was featured in went viral, leading to several fan animations replicating the sequence by replacing the anime's main character Marin Kitagawa with other characters.

== Background, composition, and release ==
"Kawaii Kaiwai" was the debut song of PiKi, a musical duo within Asobisystem's Kawaii Lab. idol project featuring Fruits Zipper member Karen Matsumoto and Cutie Street member Haruka Sakuraba. In June 2025, the song was first performed at Okinawa Collection 2025, where PiKi was introduced; Saco Makita choreographed the song's Okinawa Collection 2025 performance.

At the Okinawa Collection performance, "Kawaii Kaiwai" was confirmed to be the ending theme for the second season of the anime adaptation of My Dress-Up Darling, a manga which Sakuraba had been a fan of. Animator Saki Takahashi released a commemorative illustration celebrating the news, depicting PiKi alongside the anime's main character Marin Kitagawa.

"Kawaii Kaiwai" is an idol pop song written and performed with a focus on kawaii, particularly in its composition and lyrics. The song is relatively soft compared to most anime songs, with the vocals played over light synth instrumentals. One of the themes in the lyrics is about the role changing clothes can have in romantic relationships; according to Lauren Orsini of Anime News Network, the song's idea of "a girl feeling like a 'brand new me' when she dresses up in a brand new outfit" fits the nature of My Dress-Up Darling. Z11 of Real Sound remarked that the song "perfectly matches PiKi's concept of fusing 'cuteness' and 'retro', creating a song that feels both modern and nostalgic". Yasutaka Nakata produced the song, including the lyrics, composition, and arrangement.

"Kawaii Kaiwai" was released on CD by Sony Music Entertainment Japan on September 3, 2025. In addition to a standard edition, four special editions of the release were made available: a First Press Limited Edition with an exclusive photo booklet, two editions each dedicated to both PiKi members, and an anime edition with a specialized illustration Marin Kitagawa on the cover. A raffle was held on release day for on-site purchasers of the CD at Space O in Omotesando Hills Main Building.

== Music videos ==
A music video for "Kawaii Kaiwai" was released on July 11, 2025, at 8pm JST, with both members of PiKi participating at the chat room. In the music video, PiKi appear in rooms each themed after the four seasons, accompanied by a different outfit. Z11 says that the video "perfectly captures PiKi's pop and cute charm".

=== Ending sequence ===
An ending sequence for My Dress-Up Darling's second season, featuring "Kawaii Kaiwai", was animated by Studio Lico. Vivinos was the unit director, while Qmeng and Callnong were key animators and the latter an assistant unit director.

Writing for Anime News Network, Orsini and Steve Jones remarked that the video had gyaru aesthetics, "like a snowglobe that swirls with pink glitter", with the latter making comparisons to the opening sequence of My Roomie Is a Dino. Although Orsini said that the sequence lacks the gorier aspects of Vivinos' standard fare, Kevin Cirugeda of SakugaBlog drew comparisons to her Pink Bitch Club series, saying that the sequence "[takes] Marin's crush and her interest in fashion as an excuse to turn her into a bit of a menhera menace". The sequence also takes inspiration from vaporwave, with one of the animatics being a looping GIF-like depiction of Marin's heart pose on an retro-styled computer window.

== Reception ==
"Kawaii Kaiwai" became popular through a trend where fan animators would create videos replacing Marin with a different character; such characters involved included One Piece's Tony Tony Chopper and those from Fyodor Dostoyevsky's works. Orsini attributed the popularity of this trend to the ending sequence's "memorable visuals, which are simplified and stylized", as well as the catchy nature of the song. Isabelle Lee of Anime Trending called it "a familiar tune for many who have spent even just a little time scrolling through anime social media in the last year," explaining that the song shows that "'cute' is still cool, especially when paired with the ending's sweet, colorful visuals."

"Kawaii Kaiwai" reached number 4 on the Oricon Singles Chart and number 6 on the Oricon Combined Singles Chart. It also reached number 16 on the Billboard Japan Hot 100 and number 6 on the Billboard Japan Hot Animation. It also topped the Spotify Daily Viral Songs (Japan) chart on July 23, 2025.

== Accolades ==
Awards and nominations for "Kawaii Kaiwai"
Ceremony	Year	Award	Result	Ref.
Crunchyroll Anime Awards	2026	Best Ending Sequence	Nominated	
Japan Expo Awards	2026	Daruma for Best Ending	Nominated	

== Personnel ==
Credits adapted from Apple Music.

Musicians

- PiKi (Karen Matsumoto and Haruka Sakuraba) – performer

Technical

- Yasutaka Nakata – lyrics, composer, arranger

== Charts ==
=== Weekly charts ===
Weekly chart performance for "Kawaii Kaiwai"
Chart (2025)	Peak position
Japan (Japan Hot 100)	16
Japan Hot Animation (Billboard Japan)	6
Japan (Oricon)	4
Japan Combined Singles (Oricon)	6
