= Asia Star Entertainer Awards 2026 =

2026 edition of award ceremony

- Promotional poster
- Date: May 16–17, 2026
- Venue: Belluna Dome, Saitama
- Country: Japan
- Presented by: Newsen; @Style
- Hosted by: Hyungwon and Rei (Day 1); Lee Sung-kyung and Max Changmin (Day 2)
- Most awards: Ateez; Enhypen; Lee Jun-ho; Lim Young-woong; TVXQ! (3)
- Website: https://www.asea.kr

Television/radio coverage
- Network: Streaming: CHZZK; Naver TV; U-Next

The Asia Star Entertainer Awards 2026 was an award ceremony held at Belluna Dome in Saitama, Japan on May 16–17, 2026. It is the third edition of the annual award show Asia Star Entertainer Awards. The award ceremony was hosted by Hyungwon and Rei for the first day and Lee Sung-kyung and Max Changmin for the second day. It was broadcast live in Japan via U-Next, in Korea via Naver TV, and worldwide via CHZZK.

== Performers ==
The lineup of performers was announced throughout April and May 2026.

=== Day 1 (May 17) ===
Performances for Day 1
Artist(s)	Song(s) Performed
&Team	"We on Fire" (Korean version) "Mismatch" "Bewitched"
Alpha Drive One	"Formula" "Freak Alarm"
Candy Tune	""Baibai Fight!"
Cutie Street	"Kawaii Dake ja Dame Desu ka?"
DXTeen	"Bring the Fire" "Ryou Kataomoi"
Enhypen	"No Way Back" "Big Girls Don't Cry" "Knife" "Helium"
Fruits Zipper; Candy Tune; Cutie Street; Sweet Steady	"Watashi no Ichiban Kawaii Tokoro"
Idid	"Heaven Smiles" "Push Back" "Chan-Ran"
Sweet Steady	"Sweet Step"
VVUP	"House Party" "Super Model"

=== Day 2 (May 18) ===
Performances for Day 2
Artist(s)	Song(s) Performed
Ateez	"NASA" "Adrenaline" (Korean version)
Hearts2Hearts	"Focus" "Rude!"
Kwon Eun-bi	"Hello Stranger" "Underwater"
Max Changmin	"Fever"
Nowz	Intro: "Fiction" / "Pray (I'll Be Your Man)" / "Tomboy" / "Shine" "Everglow" "Ammo"
The Rampage from Exile Tribe	"Everest" "Break it Down" "24karats Stay Gold" "24karats Gold Genesis"
Toma Ikuta	"Super Romance"
Wild Blue	"You"
Wonho	"If You Wanna" "Maniac" "Better Than Me"
Xikers	"Iconic" "Superpower (Peak)"

== Winner and nominees ==
The winners are listed in alphanumerical order and emphasized in bold.

=== Grand prize ===
Artist of the Year
**Enhypen**
Album of the Year	Song of the Year
**Enhypen – Desire: Unleash**	**Blackpink – "Jump"**
Performance of the Year	Record the Year
**&Team**	**Ateez**

=== Main & special awards ===
The Platinum (Bonsang)
**&Team**; **Alpha Drive One**; **Ateez**; **Cutie Street**; **Enhypen**; **Fruits Zipper**; **Hearts2Hearts**; **Ive**; **The Rampage from Exile Tribe**; **TVXQ!**
Best New Artist	Best Artist
**Alpha Drive One**	**Actor: Lee Jun-ho**; **Actress: Kim Hye-yoon**; **OTT: Go Youn-jung**
Best Group	Best Solo Artist
**Female: Hearts2Hearts**; **Male: Stray Kids**	**Female: Yuqi**; **Male: Lim Young-woong**
Best Performance	Best Conceptual Artist
**Kyoka**	**Ateez**
Best Stage	Best Character
**Kwon Eun-bi**; **Toma Ikuta**; **Wonho**	Actor: **Lee Chae-min**; **Lee Jun-ho**; Actress: **Go Youn-jung**; **Lee Sung-kyung**
Best Trot	Actor: **Lee Chae-min**; **Lee Jun-ho**; Actress: **Go Youn-jung**; **Lee Sung-kyung**
**Lim Young-woong**	Actor: **Lee Chae-min**; **Lee Jun-ho**; Actress: **Go Youn-jung**; **Lee Sung-kyung**
Grand Legendary Artist of Asia	Great Legacy Artist
**TVXQ!**	**Sato Atsuhiro**
Hot Icon	Hot Trend
**Cutie Street**; **DXTeen**; **Fruits Zipper**; **Wild Blue**; **Xikers**	**Candy Tune**; **Idid**; **Nowz**; **Sweet Steady**; **VVUP**
Top Touring Artist	Best Producer
**Monsta X**; **TVXQ!**	**Masaya Kimura**
Best OST
**Sung Han-bin – "You Are Spring" (from Spring Fever)**

=== Popularity awards ===
Fan Choice – Couple
**Lee Chae-min and Lim Yoona – Bon Appétit, Your Majesty**
Fan Choice – Artist	Fan Choice – 5th Generation Artist
**Actor / Actress: Lee Jun-ho**; **Singer: Lim Young-woong**	**AHOF**

== Multiple awards ==
The following artist(s) received two or more awards:

Count	Artist(s)
3	Ateez
3	Enhypen
3	Lee Jun-ho
3	Lim Young-woong
3	TVXQ!
2	&Team
2	Alpha Drive One
2	Cutie Street
2	Fruits Zipper
2	Go Youn-jung
2	Hearts2Hearts
2	Lee Chae-min
