= Vivinos =

South Korean YouTuber (born 1990s)

- Born: 1996 or 1997 (age 29–30)
- Occupation: Animator
- Notable work: Alien Stage

YouTube information
- Channel: VIVINOS
- Genre: Animation
- Subscribers: 3.71 million
- Views: 543 million
- Last updated: 28 september 2026

Soyeon Kim (Korean: 김소연; born 5 February 1996 or 1997), known professionally as Vivinos (Korean: 비비노스, stylized in uppercase), is a South Korean YouTuber and animator. She is the creator of the web series Pink Bitch Club and Alien Stage and animated the ending sequence for My Dress-Up Darling's second season, featuring the PiKi song "Kawaii Kaiwai". Her work draws inspiration from Japanese media aimed at girls, as well as retro art.

== Early life and career ==
Vivinos was born on 5 February 1996 or 1997 and her career as an illustrator began in 2012. Her animation career began with several fan videos related to genres like K-dramas, before shifting towards darker fare. One fan-made video for Jun Togawa's song "Suki Suki Daisuki", depicting a yandere girl's obsession with her senpai, reached 13 million views. She also created a web video series called Pink Bitch Club, which she called one of her first team efforts. She also creates standalone short videos such as "My September" and "Tili Tili Bom".

On 7 September 2022, Vivinos premiered her short-form web animation series Alien Stage, where six contestants are forced to participate in an intergalactic music competition with a death game format. By June 2025, the series had been viewed millions of times on YouTube, with the then-latest episode receiving ten million alone. In October 2025, Animate ran a tie-in pop-up store for Alien Stage – titled "The First Anomaly Party" – at their Ikebukuro Flagship Store, as well as a nationwide "Alien Stage Animate Fair 2025". In March 2026, Tokyopop released an English-language art book for the series, titled Alien Stage: The Art Book.

Vivinos was one of six artists featured in the book Artists in Korea and Artists in Taiwan, a collaboration between Pixiv, Clover Press, and Media Do. She was a panelist at Anime Expo 2025, where she hosted a live drawing session. She and Qmeng animated the ending sequence for My Dress-Up Darling's second season, featuring the PiKi song "Kawaii Kaiwai".

== Personal life ==
Vivinos is based in Seoul. She is self-taught as an animator.

== Themes ==
Vivinos draws inspiration from retro art styles. Masaki Morita of Kai-You remarked that her music videos she made by 2022 possess "a retro and cute style reminiscent of 1990s–2000s shōjo manga and jojimuke anime." Lauren Orsini of Anime News Network noted that Alien Stage was "creepy-cute [and] color-saturated", and that Vivinos's "Kawaii Kaiwai" sequence's illustrations of Marin Kitagawa, the main character of My Dress-Up Darling, were "profoundly pink". Kevin Cirugeda of Sakuga Blog compared the "Kawaii Kaiwai" sequence to Pink Bitch Club, saying that it "[took] Marin's crush and her interest in fashion as an excuse to turn her into a bit of a menhera menace".

Kara Dennison of Otaku USA remarked that some of her videos have a nostalgic vibe, with her "Suki Suki Daisuki" video displaying "a weirdly cute 80s vibe". The "Kawaii Kaiwai" sequence takes inspiration from vaporwave, with one of the animatics being a looping GIF-like depiction of Marin's heart pose on an retro-styled computer window. Other videos with similar themes include the Pink Bitch Club series, as well as "My September" and "Tili Tili Bom".

Some of Vivinos's videos take inspiration from the yuri genre, a personal creative choice on her part.
