= VVUP =

South Korean girl group

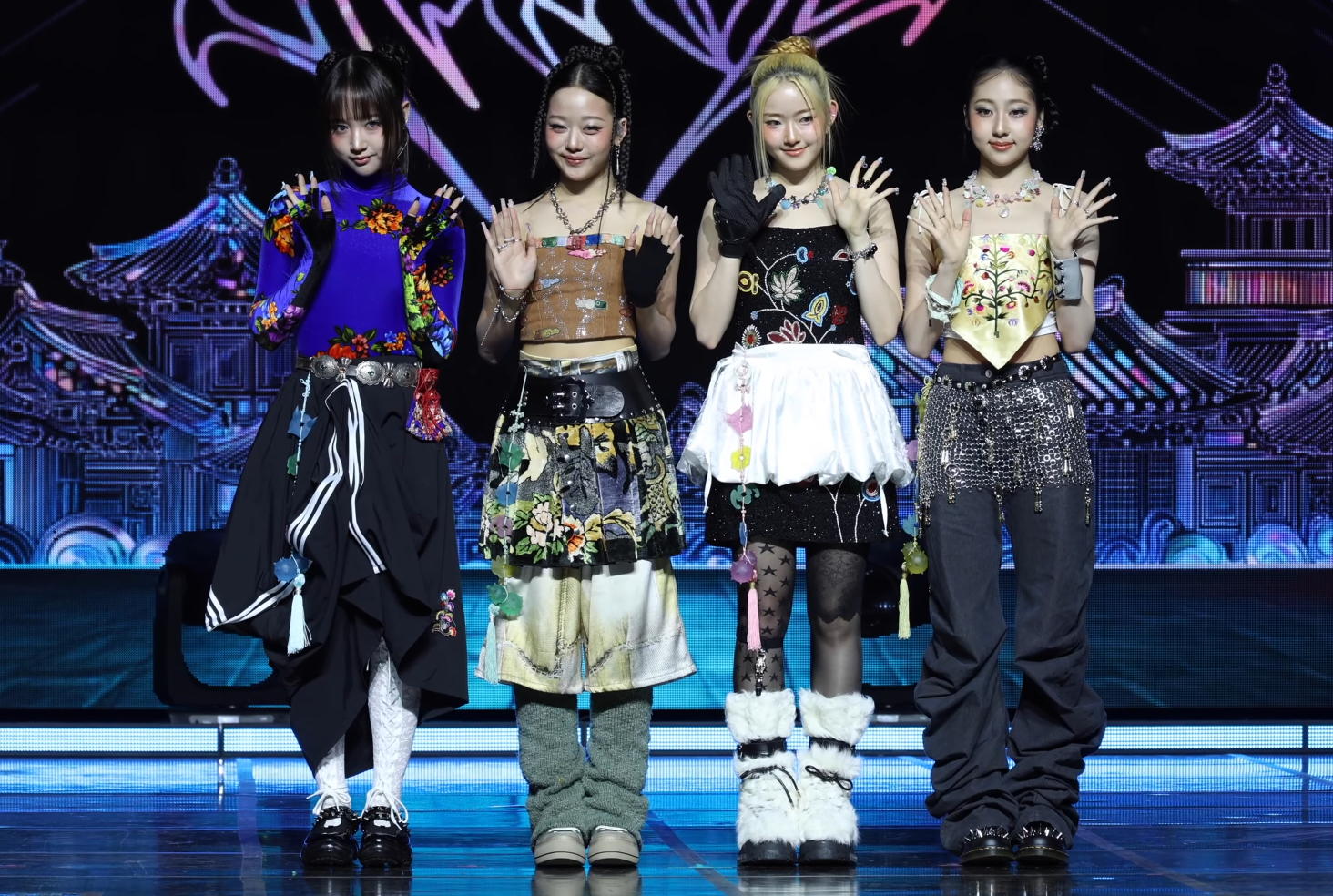
- VVUP in October 2025; L–R: Kim, Paan, Suyeon, and Jiyoon

Background information
- Origin: Seoul, South Korea
- Genre: K-pop
- Years active: 2024–present
- Label: EgoENT
- Members: Kim; Paan; Suyeon; Jiyoon
- Past members: Hyunny

VVUP (Korean: 비비업) is a South Korean girl group formed by EgoENT in 2024. The group consists of four members: Kim, Paan, Suyeon, and Jiyoon. Former member Hyunny departed from the group in August 2024 due to health issues.

== History ==
=== 2024–present: Formation and debut ===
On February 23, 2024, EgoENT released a picture of its new girl group with members Kim, Paan, Suyeon, and Hyunny. VVUP released their pre-debut single "Doo Doom Chit" on March 13, 2024. They officially debuted on April 1, with single album Locked On. On July 3, VVUP released their second digital single "Ain't Nobody", which Hyunny got credited as the songwriter. On August 29, EgoENT announced Hyunny's departure from the group due to health issues.

Following Hyunny's departure, EgoENT announced VVUP's new member Jiyoon, who joined the group with the release of their special digital single "4 Life". "4 Life" was released on January 10, 2025.

== Members ==
Current members

- Kim (킴) (2024–present)
- Paan (팬) (2024–present)
- Suyeon (수연) (2024–present)
- Jiyoon (지윤) (2025–present)

Former member

- Hyunny (현희) – leader (2024)

== Other Ventures ==
On January 24, 2025, Global brand Mark & Lona announced a special collaborative items with VVUP on their 2025SS RICH & FAMOUS Collections.. On February 24, 2026, it was announced that VVUP became the brand ambassador of the beauty product Pretty Actually Indonesia.

== Discography ==
=== Extended plays ===
List of extended plays, showing selected details
Title	Details
Vvon	Released: November 20, 2025; Label: EgoENT; Formats: CD, digital download, streaming; Track listing: 1. "House Party"; 2. "Super Model"; 3. "Invested In You"; 4. "Giddy Boy"; 5. "4 Life"; 6. "House Party (Inst.)"; 7. "Super Model (Inst.)"; 8. "Invested In You (Inst.)"; 9. "Giddy Boy (Inst.)"; 10. "4 Life (Inst.)"

=== Single albums ===
List of single albums, showing selected details
Title	Details
Locked On	Released: April 1, 2024; Label: EgoENT; Formats: CD, digital download, streaming

=== Singles ===
List of singles, showing year released, and name of the album
Title	Year	Album
"Doo Doom Chit"	2024	Non-album single
"Locked On"	2024	Non-album single
"Ain't Nobody"	2024	Non-album single
"4 Life"	2025	Vvon
"Giddy Boy"	2025	Vvon
"House Party"	2025	Vvon
"Super Model"	2025	Vvon

== Videography ==
=== Music Videos ===
Title	Year	Director	Ref.
"Doo Doom Chit"	2024	Hannah Lux Davis	
"Locked On"	2024	Hannah Lux Davis	
"Ain't Nobody"	2024	Unknown	
"4 Life"	2025	Unknown	
"Giddy Boy"	2025	Unknown	
"House Party"	2025	Soobin Park (SOOB)	
"Supermodel"	2025	Phuong Vu (Antiantiart), Nguyen Hai Nguyen (The Tripod Guys)	

== Awards and nominations ==
List of accolades, showing the name of the award ceremony, year presented, award category, nominee(s) of the award, and the result of the nomination
Award ceremony	Year	Category	Nominees(s)/Work(s)	Result	Ref.
Seoul Success Awards	2024	New Artist Award	VVUP	Won	
Seoul Music Awards	2025	Rising Star Award	VVUP	Won	
Brand of The Year Awards	2025	Best Rookie Female Idol	VVUP	Nominated	
Brand of The Year Awards	2026	Female Idol Rising Star (Indonesia)	VVUP	Won	
Korea First Brand Awards (Note: The Korea First Brand Awards is hosted by the Korea Consumer Brand Committee and the Korea Consumer Forum. Awards are based on a nationwide survey held in South Korea.)	2026	Female Rising Star (Indonesia)	VVUP	Won	
Asia Star Entertainer Awards	2026	Hot Trend	VVUP	Won	
Asia Star Entertainer Awards	2026	Fan Choice - 5th Generation Artist	VVUP	Nominated	
KM Chart Awards (Note: Hosted by KM Chart World and organized by MyDaily. KM Chart Awards (previously called the Universal Superstar Awards) is the annual settlement awards of KM Chart and is a global award ceremony that selects and awards artists loved by the world's public and fans through K-Music.)	2026	KM Next Potential	VVUP	Won	
MAMA Awards	2026	Fans' Choice Top 10 – Female	VVUP	Nominated	
