= PiKi =

Japanese idol group

- Origin: Japan
- Genres: J-pop
- Years active: 2025–present
- Labels: Asobisystem, Sony Music Entertainment Japan
- Spinoff of: Kawaii Lab.
- Members: Karen Matsumoto; Haruka Sakuraba
- Website: piki.asobisystem.com

PiKi is a Japanese idol duo affiliated with Asobisystem. Composed of Fruits Zipper member Karen Matsumoto and Cutie Street member Haruka Sakuraba, they are known for the 2025 song "Kawaii Kaiwai", the ending theme for the second season of the anime adaptation of My Dress-Up Darling.

== History ==
Karen Matsumoto and Haruka Sakuraba are both members of Asobisystem's Kawaii Lab. idol project, with Matsumoto part of Fruits Zipper and Sakuraba part of Cutie Street. The duo later became known among fans under the nickname "Parurentan", a portmanteau of their fandom nicknames, and they appeared together on the cover of Larme's 62nd issue, released in September 2024; Model Press remarked that their "two-shot photo [was] overflowing with a charming, girlish mood". The two subsequently formed their own musical duo, PiKi.

PiKi was introduced at Okinawa Collection 2025 at Okinawa Arena on June 21, 2025, where they performed their song "Kawaii Kaiwai" for the first time. PiKi was named after the duo themselves: the P and K stand for Sakuraba and Matsumoto's fandom nicknames, and it is the Hawaiian language word for peach. "Kawaii Kaiwai" was also the ending theme for the second season of the anime adaptation of My Dress-Up Darling. The song went viral on Spotify, and it reached the top ten at the Oricon Singles Chart and Oricon Combined Singles Chart and the top 20 at the Billboard Japan Hot 100.

PiKi appeared on the cover of the July 14, 2025, issue of Aera, making their debut on the magazine, and they released "Tell Me Tell Me", the theme song of the fortune-telling Oha Suta segment "Hoshiten: Furui Corner", on July 21. On August 29, their song "88888888", a collaboration with the 2025 film Exit 8 was released digitally. PiKi also performed that song at Music Station that same day, the first time the duo had appeared on the show.

Z11 of Real Sound said that "within Kawaii Lab., PiKi has quickly made a leap forward as a unit embodying Japan's original "kawaii" culture. Their catchy, mainstream idol songs, using "kawaii" as their weapon, are breathing new life into the Japanese music scene."

== Members ==
- Karen Matsumoto
- Haruka Sakuraba

== Discography ==
=== Singles ===
Title	Year	Peak chart positions			Album
Title	Year	JPN	JPN Cmb.	JPN Hot	Album
"Kawaii Kaiwai"	2025	4	6	16	Non-album singles
"88888888"	2025	—	—	— (Note: "88888888" did not enter the Billboard Japan Hot 100 chart but peaked at number 98 on the component Download Songs chart.)	Non-album singles
"—" denotes releases that did not chart.
