= Kawaii Lab. =

Japanese talent agency

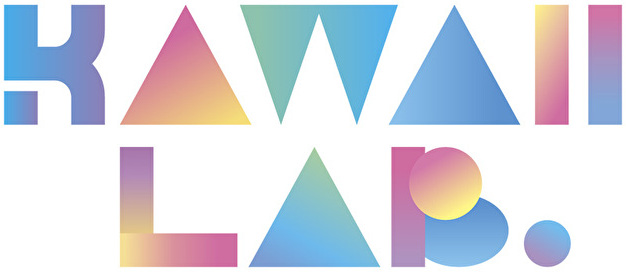
- Founded: February 14, 2022
- Founder: Asobisystem
- Genre: Japanese pop
- Country of origin: Japan
- Location: Harajuku, Japan
- Official website: kawaiilab.asobisystem.com

Kawaii Lab. (カワイイラボ, Kawaii Rabo; stylized in all caps) is a Japanese idol project by Asobisystem founded in 2022, with the goal of sharing Japanese idols worldwide. The project is led and produced by model and former Musubizm leader Misa Kimura and has produced girl groups Fruits Zipper, Candy Tune, Sweet Steady, Cutie Street, and More Star.

== History ==
=== 2022–present: Establishment and formation of girl groups ===
Kawaii Lab. was founded on February 14, 2022, as an idol project by Asobisystem. The project is led by model and TV personality Misa Kimura, a former member of Musubizm where she was the group's leader. Its slogan is "From Harajuku to the world" (原宿から世界へ, Harajuku kara Sekai e) as it aims to produce idols who can be active on the world stage.

On the day that Kawaii Lab. was established, Idolater, a girl group formed in 2019, joined the project as its first artist. The seven member line-up of the project's first girl group, Fruits Zipper was revealed on February 22, 2022. Fruits Zipper released their debut digital single, "Kimi no Akarui Mirai o Oikakete" (君の明るい未来を追いかけて), on April 10. On December 14, the first members of Kawaii Lab.'s second girl group, which would later be known as Candy Tune, were announced.

Candy Tune's seven-member line-up was complete by mid-February 2023 and they released their debut eponymous digital album on March 7. On September 13, Fruits Zipper released its debut maxi single, "Watashi no Ichiban Kawaī tokoro" (わたしの一番かわいいところ). The song, which had originally been released digitally on April 29, 2022, went viral on TikTok. Idolater disbanded after their final concert on October 15. On November 21, Kawaii Lab. launched the trainee group called Kawaii Lab. Mates.

The formation of Kawaii Lab.'s third girl group, Sweet Steady, was announced on January 23, 2024. Sweet Steady's initial eight-member line-up consisted only of promoted trainees from Kawaii Lab. Mates. Sweet Steady released their debut digital single, "Hajimari no Aizu", on March 1. On July 23, Kawaii Lab. announced that they would form a fourth girl group. The group's name Cutie Street and eight member line-up consisting of three promoted Kawaii Lab. Mates members was revealed on July 30. On August 7, Candy Tune's debut maxi single, "Kiss Me Pattisier", was released. On November 13, Cutie Street released their debut maxi single, "Kawaii Dake ja Dame Desu ka?" (かわいいだけじゃだめですか？). Sweet Steady released their debut maxi single on December 18.

On June 21, 2025, Kawaii Lab. debuted the duo PiKi, composed of Fruits Zipper's Karen Matsumoto and Cutie Street's Haruka Sakuraba, with the lead single, "Kawaii Kaiwai", which was used as the ending theme song for the second season of My Dress-Up Darling.

== Artists ==
=== Current ===
- Fruits Zipper
- Candy Tune
- Sweet Steady
- Cutie Street
- PiKi
- More Star

=== Former ===
- Idolater
