= Hair Cut (song) =

Single by Xdinary Heroes

from the EP Overload
- Language: Korean
- Released: November 11, 2022
- Length: 3:25
- Label: JYP
- Composers: Shim Eun-ji, Lee Hae-sol Gunil, Jungsu, Gaon, O.de, Jun Han, Jooyeon
- Lyricists: Shim Eun-ji, Gunil, Jungsu, Gaon, O.de, Jun Han, Jooyeon

Xdinary Heroes singles chronology
| "Strawberry Cake" (2022) | "Hair Cut" (2022) | "Freakin' Bad" (2023) |

Music video
- "Hair Cut" on YouTube

"Hair Cut" is a song recorded by South Korean boy band Xdinary Heroes for their second extended play Overload. It was released by JYP Entertainment as a single on November 11, 2022.

== Background and release ==
On September 16, the band announced that they will have a comeback on November 4. A month later, on October 17 and 18, the band released concept photos for the comeback and EP. On October 19, the promotional schedule was released. On October 30, JYP Entertainment announced the postponement of the EP due to the national mourning period following the Itaewon Halloween crowd crush incident that happened a day earlier. On November 6, JYP Entertainment announced Overload would be released on November 11. The music video teasers for lead single "Hair Cut" was released on November 8 and 9. On November 11, the EP was released alongside the music video for "Hair Cut".

== Composition ==
"Hair Cut" was written by Shim Eun-ji, Gunil, Jungsu, Gaon, O.de, Jun Han and Jooyeon and composed by Shim Eun-ji, Lee Hae-sol Gunil, Jungsu, Gaon, O.de, Jun Han and Jooyeon. The song is in the genre of rock music that presents catharsis with a colorful melody composition, powerful band sound, and the bold determination of 'I will defeat the darkness and be reborn'. The song is composed in the key B Minor and has 130 beats per minute and a running time of 3 minutes and 25 seconds.

The title song 'Hair Cut' contains a hopeful message to cut out the negative thoughts that grow in the heart and inner conflicts by comparing them to hair so that they do not encroach on them.

— Gunil describing the song

== Promotion ==
Xdinary Heroes first performed "Hair Cut" on Show! Music Core on November 12. They performed on SBS's Inkigayo on November 13 and on MBC M's Show Champion on November 16.

== Charts ==
Weekly chart performance for "Hair Cut"
| Chart (2022) | Peak positions |
|---|---|
| South Korea Download (Circle) | 124 |

== Release history ==
Release history and formats for "Hair Cut"
| Region | Date | Format | Label |
|---|---|---|---|
| Various | November 11, 2022 | Digital download; streaming | Studio J; JYP |
