= Karen Matsumoto =

Japanese singer (born 2002)

Karen Matsumoto 松本 かれん
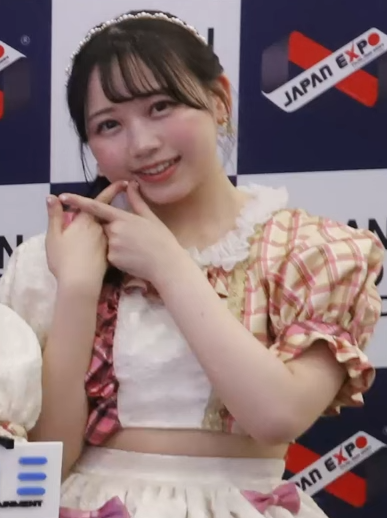
- Matsumoto in 2024

Background information
- Born: 28 March 2002 (age 24)
- Origin: Chiba Prefecture, Japan
- Genre: J-pop
- Occupation: Singer
- Instrument: Vocals
- Years active: 2022–present
- Label: Kawaii Lab.
- Member of: Fruits Zipper; PiKi

Karen Matsumoto (Japanese: 松本 かれん, Hepburn: Matsumoto Karen; born 28 March 2002) is a Japanese singer and model from Chiba Prefecture, affiliated with Asobisystem. She is a member of the idol groups Fruits Zipper and PiKi.

== Biography ==
Karen Matsumoto, a native of Chiba Prefecture, was born on 28 March 2002. She was enrolled as a piano major at a junior college specializing in music. She was also active as a TikToker.

After Matsumoto posted on social media about her desire to become an idol, an acquaintance introduced her to Asobisystem after discovering the post. In February 2022, she was announced to be one of the inaugural members of Fruits Zipper, an idol group which is part of Asobisystem's Kawaii Lab. project. She was one of the first three members to join the group when it was formed. Fruits Zipper marked her debut as an idol.

On 13 September 2023, Matsumoto received her own released edition of Fruits Zipper's single "Watashi no Ichiban Kawaii Tokoro". In June 2025, she formed the new unit PiKi with Cutie Street member Haruka Sakuraba. Shiho Namayuka of QJWeb described Matsumoto as the "true embodiment" of the group's New Kawaii concept. In August 2025, her birthday fan event was delayed by five days due to health concerns on Matsumoto's part. She was ranked runner-up in the "Female Idol / Artist" category in Model Press's 2026 Hit Predictions forecast.

In January 2026, Matsumoto received supportive reactions from social media users after she indirectly confirmed that she likes Suzuka, a member of Atarashii Gakko!, after the two appeared together on Count Down TV's 2025 New Year's Eve special. She has a cat named Matsumoto Ono Komachi. She also has two younger brothers.
