= Candy Tune =

Japanese idol girl group

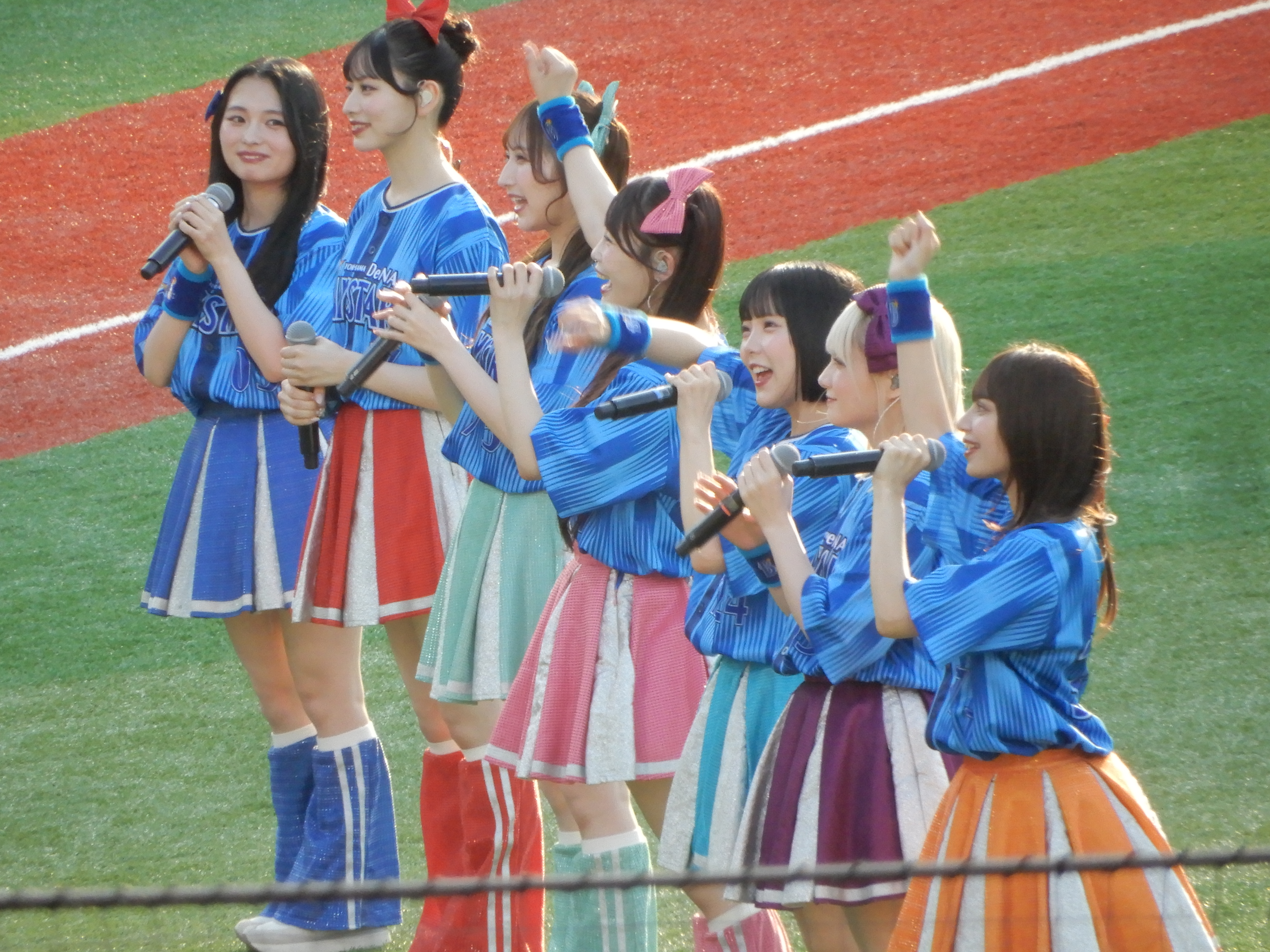
- Candy Tune in 2025 at Yokohama Stadium

Background information
- Origin: Japan
- Genre: J-pop
- Years active: 2023–present
- Label: Kawaii Lab.
- Members: Rino Fukuyama; Mizuki Kirihara; Natsu Minami; Nanako Ogawa; Bibian Murakawa; Shizuka Miyano; Kotomi Tachibana
- Website: asobisystem.com/talent/candytune/

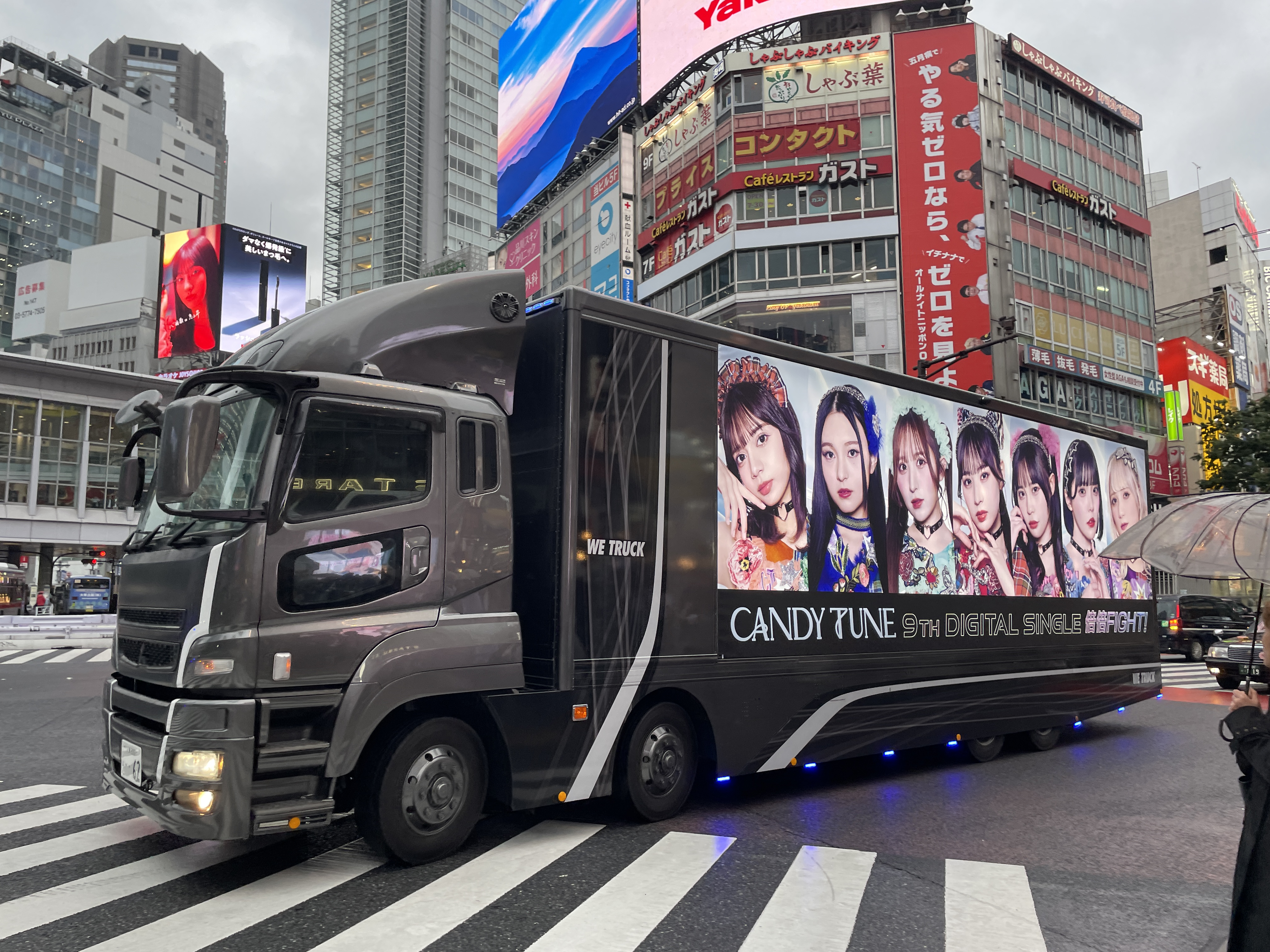
Bus with all members of Candy Tune on the side

Candy Tune (stylized in all caps) is a Japanese girl group that formed in 2023. They debuted with their eponymous digital album in March 2023.

== History ==
=== 2022–present: Formation and debut ===
On December 14, 2022, Asobi System's Kawaii Lab. announced that Rino Fukuyama and Mizuki Kirihara would be the first two members in the formation of the company's second girl group, the first being Fruits Zipper. On January 14, 2023, Natsu Minami and Nanako Ogawa joined the line-up. On February 2, it was announced that the group's name would be Candy Tune. On February 14, Bibian Murakawa, Shizuka Miyano, and Kotomi Tachibana joined the group to complete the line-up.

On March 7, 2023, they released their debut eponymous digital album. They performed live for the first time on March 14. On April 7, their first digital single, "Tune My Way", was released. On May 20, their second digital single, "Catch You", was released. On June 27, they held their first concert at Spotify O-West in Tokyo and released their third digital single, "CuCuCuCute". On September 27, they released their fourth digital single, "Wao! Aoharu!". On October 18, they performed at Zepp Shinjuku in Tokyo and released their fifth digital single, "Twilight Dilemma". On November 17, their sixth digital single, "Hissatsu Azato Pose", was released.

Candy Tune performed overseas for the first time at Japan Expo Thailand 2024 which was held from February 2 to February 4, 2024. On February 16, their seventh digital single, "Sonaeareba Momantai", was released, followed by their eighth digital single, "Ienakatta Kotoba ~ Arigatō ~", on March 8. In March and April 2024, they held a tour to celebrate their first anniversary. Their ninth digital single, "Baibai Fight!", was released on April 24. On June 19, they released a cover of Kiminone's "Laid Back Journey" as their tenth digital single. On August 7, Candy Tune's first single, "Kiss Me Pattisier", was released.

== Members ==
- Rino Fukuyama (福山梨乃)
- Mizuki Kirihara (桐原美月)
- Natsu Minami (南なつ)
- Nanako Ogawa (小川奈々子)
- Bibian Murakawa (村川緋杏)
- Shizuka Miyano (宮野静)
- Kotomi Tachibana (立花琴未)

== Discography ==
=== Studio albums ===
Title	Details	Peak chart positions	Sales
Title	Details	JPN	Sales
Candy Tune	Released: March 7, 2023; Label: Kawaii Lab.; Formats: Digital download, streaming	—	
Baibai Fight! (倍倍FIGHT!)	Released: October 1, 2025; Label: Asobi Music; Formats: CD, digital download, streaming	2	JPN: 32,127

=== Extended plays ===
Title	Details
Candy Tune Solo Box	Released: October 28, 2026; Label: Asobi Music; Formats: Digital download, streaming

=== Singles ===
Title	Year	Peak chart positions		Certifications	Album
Title	Year	JPN	JPN Hot	Certifications	Album
"Tune My Way"	2023	—	—		Non-album singles
"Catch You"	2023	—	—		Non-album singles
"CuCuCuCute" (きゅきゅきゅキュート)	2023	—	—		Non-album singles
"Wao! Aoharu!" (Wao!アオハル!)	2023	—	—		Non-album singles
"Twilight Dilemma"	2023	—	—		Baibai Fight!
"Hissatsu Azato Pose" (必殺あざとポーズ)	2023	—	—		Baibai Fight!
"Sonaeareba Momantai" (備えあれば無問題)	2024	—	—		Non-album singles
"Ienakatta Kotoba (Arigatō)" (いえなかったことば~ありがとう~)	2024	—	—		Non-album singles
"Baibai Fight!" (倍倍Fight!)	2024	—	58	RIAJ: Platinum (st.)	Baibai Fight!
"Laid Back Journey" (レイドバックジャーニー)	2024	—	—		Non-album single
"Kiss Me Pattisier" (キス・ミー・パティシエ)	2024	9	45		Baibai Fight!
"Oshi Suki Shindoi" (推し♡好き♡しんどい)	2025	2	7		Baibai Fight!
"Happy Bounce Birthday"	2026	2	3	RIAJ: Gold (phy.)	Non-album singles
"Soi So Free" (総意♡So Free)	2026	2	5	RIAJ: Platinum (phy.)	Non-album singles
"Special Kanshasai" (スペシャル感謝祭)	2026	2	—	RIAJ: Platinum (phy.)	Non-album singles
"—" denotes releases that did not chart or were not released in that region.
