= Freakin' Bad =

Single by Xdinary Heroes

from the EP Deadlock
- Language: Korean
- Released: April 26, 2023
- Length: 3:03
- Label: JYP
- Composers: O.de, Jun Han, Jooyeon, Song Hee-jin (Solcire), Kevin Oppa (Solcire), Young Won-hee (Solcire)
- Lyricists: O.de, Jun Han, Jooyeon, Song Hee-jin (Solcire), Kevin Oppa (Solcire)

Xdinary Heroes singles chronology
| "Hair Cut" (2022) | "Freakin' Bad" (2023) | "Break the Break" (2023) |

Music video
- "Freakin' Bad" on YouTube

"Freakin' Bad" is a song recorded by South Korean boy band Xdinary Heroes for their third extended play Deadlock. It was released by JYP Entertainment as a single on April 26, 2023.

== Background and release ==
On April 7, 2023 JYP Entertainment announced that Xdinary Heroes would release their third EP, Deadlock on April 26. On April 10, lyrics for "Freakin' Bad" was first teased on Xdinary Heroes social media accounts. Between April 11 to April 17 JYP Entertainment posted motion posters and concept photos for each member. On April 26, "Freakin' Bad" and the EP Deadlock was released.

== Composition ==
"Freakin' Bad" was written by O.de, Jun Han, Jooyeon, Song Hee-jin (Solcire), Kevin Oppa (Solcire) and composed by O.de, Jun Han, Jooyeon, Song Hee-jin (Solcire), Kevin Oppa (Solcire), Young Won-hee (Solcire). "Freakin' Bad" is characterised by having an 808 bass and intense guitar riffs with lyrics that captures "the many worries between hero and villain" and "the message to get out of the world that separates good from evil." The song is composed in the key A Major and has 102 beats per minute and a running time of 3 minutes and 03 seconds.

== Promotion ==
Xdinary Heroes first performed "Freakin' Bad" on Mnet M Countdown show on April 27. Xdinary Heroes also performed on three other music programs in the first week of promotion: Music Bank on April 28 Show! Music Core, on April 29 and SBS's Inkigayo on April 30.

== Charts ==
=== Weekly charts ===
Weekly chart performance for "Freakin' Bad"
| Chart (2023) | Peak positions |
|---|---|
| South Korea Download (Circle) | 85 |

== Release history ==
Release history and formats for "Freakin' Bad"
| Region | Date | Format | Label |
|---|---|---|---|
| Various | April 26, 2023 | Digital download; streaming | Studio J; JYP |
