= Alien Stage =

2022 South Korean animated web series

- Also known as: ALNST; 에일리언 스테이지
- Genre: Dystopian; Musical
- Created by: Vivinos
- Creative directors: Vivinos; Qmeng
- Country of origin: South Korea
- Original language: Korean
- No. of seasons: 1
- No. of episodes: 12

Production
- Animator: Studio Lico

Original release
- Network: YouTube
- Release: September 7, 2022 – June 27, 2025

Alien Stage (Korean: 에일리언 스테이지; stylized as ALIEN STAGE) is a South Korean dystopian science-fiction musical web series created by animator Vivinos. The series premiered on YouTube on September 7, 2022, and was developed in collaboration with animation director Qmeng and Studio Lico. It combines original music, short-form animation, and supplementary illustrated stories.

Set in a future in which extraterrestrials have subjugated humanity, the series follows a group of humans forced to participate in a televised singing competition where losing contestants face execution. Its narrative centers on the relationships between the contestants and explores captivity, exploitation, personal autonomy, and love.

Unlike conventional animated television series, Alien Stage communicates much of its story through musical performances, visual storytelling, and flashbacks rather than spoken dialogue. The original storyline was presented through a series of animated releases between September 2022 and June 2025.

The project subsequently expanded through soundtrack releases, illustrated publications, merchandise, and live entertainment. An anime adaptation was announced at Anime Expo in July 2026. A separate 3D concert project, Alien Stage Museum in 2372, was also announced in 2026, with international performances planned for 2027. An alternate-universe spin-off titled Zombie Stage premiered in June 2026, reimagining the original series' characters in a zombie-themed setting.

== Premise ==
In the world of Alien Stage, humanity lives under the control of an extraterrestrial civilization. Humans are treated as possessions and are bred, raised, and trained to entertain alien audiences.

Several of the principal characters grow up together at Anakt Garden, an institution where human children are educated and prepared for their roles as entertainers.

The central competition, known as Alien Stage, is a televised singing tournament in which human contestants perform against one another. The contestant who loses a round is ordinarily executed, while the winner advances.

The story follows several contestants whose childhood relationships become central to the competition. Their performances reveal memories, emotional attachments, conflicts, and the consequences of living under alien rule.

While the competition provides the main narrative structure, the series also depicts resistance to the extraterrestrial authorities.

== Characters ==
The principal characters include six humans, five of whom participate directly in the central competition. Their singing performances are provided by different vocal artists.

- Mizi (미지; Miji; singing voice: Rubyeye) is a pink-haired contestant who is 22 years old at the beginning of the series and 29 following the time skip. Known for her outgoing and optimistic personality, she grew up in Anakt Garden, where she developed a close friendship and eventual romantic relationship with Sua. Their relationship ends tragically when Sua is killed during their performance against each other in the first round of Alien Stage.
- Sua (수아; Sua; singing voice: C!naH) is a 23-year-old contestant with black hair. Described by creator VIVINOS as elusive yet bold, Sua grew up alongside Mizi in Anakt Garden, where the two became romantically involved. She is killed during the first round of Alien Stage, in which she competes against Mizi and sacrifices herself, for her God and universe to live.
- Till (틸; Til; singing voice: AKUGETSU) is a grey-haired contestant who is 21 years old at the beginning of the series and 28 following the time skip. Although initially portrayed as timid and emotionally sensitive, he frequently exhibits a rebellious temperament, resulting in punishment from the aliens. He is the son of Io and has a complicated relationship with Ivan, whom he secretly drew portraits of during childhood. Till initially harbors unrequited romantic feelings for Mizi but eventually recognizes their immaturity and moves beyond them.
- Ivan (이반; Iban; singing voice: Park Byeong-hoon) is a 22-year-old contestant distinguished by his black hair and dark eyes with red pupils. Standing at 186 cm (6 ft 1 in), he is the tallest of the principal characters. Characterized by his reserved and enigmatic demeanor, Ivan develops romantic feelings for Till, whom he has known since childhood.
- Hyuna (현아; Hyeona; singing voice: 6FU) is a 27-year-old contestant with brown hair. She is characterized by her independent, outspoken, and rebellious personality. Hyuna is the sister of Hyunwoo and becomes involved in resistance against the aliens. She ultimately sacrifices her life to protect Luka from a gunshot.
- Luka (루카; Ruka; singing voice: BL8M) is a blond-haired contestant who is 30 years old at the beginning of the series and 37 following the time skip. A previous winner of the 49th season of Alien Stage, he has accumulated nine victories and achieved widespread popularity among alien audiences, giving rise to a phenomenon known as "Luka syndrome". Despite his public popularity, he is depicted as emotionally distant and calculating. Luka has several chronic medical conditions, including a cardiovascular disorder and Raynaud's phenomenon, which causes discoloration of his fingertips.

The main characters' relationships are established through their childhood experiences and developed across the musical episodes and supplementary material.

The distinction between a character's singing performer and speaking voice actor is important because the series occasionally uses separate performers for spoken dialogue.

== Episodes ==
The first teaser for Alien Stage was released on September 5, 2022, followed by the premiere of Round 1 on September 7.

The following table retains the current article's twelve-release chronology.

No.	Title	Original release date	Ref.
1	"Round 1"	September 7, 2022	
2	"ALIEN STAGE"	September 14, 2022	
3	"Round 2"	October 5, 2022	
4	"Round 3"	January 5, 2023	
5	"Round 5"	April 28, 2023	
6	"Top 3"	August 25, 2023	
7	"MIZISUA"	August 27, 2023	
8	"All-in"	December 9, 2023	
9	"Round 6"	April 5, 2024	
10	"Final"	October 25, 2024	
11	"wiege"	February 14, 2025	
12	"KARMA"	June 27, 2025	

== Production ==
=== Development and animation ===
Alien Stage was created by Vivinos, whose earlier animation projects were published on her YouTube channel. The project was developed in collaboration with Qmeng and Studio Lico.

The project's production credits identify Vivinos as chief director, Qmeng as animation director, and Kang as producer. The creators' work combines illustrated character narratives with music-driven animation.

The series is principally distributed through the official VIVINOS YouTube channel, with supplementary material released through associated social media accounts and publications.

=== Music ===
Music is a central storytelling component of Alien Stage. Original songs accompany the animated performances, while flashbacks and other visual sequences reveal the characters' personal histories.

Studio Lico was involved in the production and distribution of the original soundtrack, with vocal performances supplied by individual singers portraying the characters.

In addition to songs introduced through the animated releases, the franchise has released alternate versions, remixes, and additional character-focused music.

== Music ==
=== Original Soundtrack ===
==== Parts 1 to 8, during Alien Stage ====
Released between September 16, 2022, to October 25, 2024, as separate songs, corresponding to their episodes
No.	Title	Lyrics	Music	Artist	Length
1.	"My Clematis" (Korean: 나의 클레마티스; RR: Naui Keullematiseu)	Kang Kyung-min	Team JL	Rubyeye; C!naH	3:52
2.	"Sweet Dream"	XENO VIBE; BL8M	XENO VIBE	C!naH	1:43
3.	"Unknown (Till the End...)"	XENO VIBE; BL8M	XENO VIBE	Akugetsu	2:07
4.	"Black Sorrow"	Studio Lico; Choi Yong-su	Studio Lico; Choi Yong-su; Do Sung-il	Park Byeong-hoon	3:14
5.	"Ruler of My Heart"	Yeom Su-ji	Studio Lico; Park Byung-dae	BL8M; Rubyeye	3:39
6.	"All-In"	Yeom Su-ji	Studio Lico; Choi Yong-su	6FU;	2:56
7.	"Cure"	Studio Lico; Manju	Park Byung-dae; Studio Lico; Choi Yong-su	Akugetsu; Park Byeong-hoon	4:08
8.	"Blink Gone"	Studio Lico; Manju	Park Byung-dae; Studio Lico; Choi Yong-su	BL8M; Akugetsu	3:09

==== Parts 9 and 10, after Alien Stage ====
Released on February 14, 2025, and June 27, 2025, respectively.
No.	Title	Lyrics	Music	Artist	Length
1.	"Wiege"	Kapoo	Whisty	BL8M; 6FU	3:56
2.	"KARMA"	Manju	Choi Yongsu	Rubyeye, C!naH	05:36

=== Remix albums ===
List of remix albums and year of release
Album	Details
Alien Stage 1st Anniversary Remix Pt. 1	Released: September 17, 2023; Label: Studio Lico; Formats: Digital download, streaming; Track listing: 1. "Black Sorrow (ALNST 1st Anniversary Remix)" (Rubeye); 2. "Sweet Dream (ALNST 1st Anniversary Remix)" (BL8M); 3. "My Clematis (ALNST 1st Anniversary Remix)" (Park Byeong-hoon & AKUGETSU)
Alien Stage 1st Anniversary Remix Pt. 2	Released: December 21, 2023; Label: Studio Lico; Formats: Digital download, streaming; Track listing: 1. "Ruler of my Heart - ALNST 1st Anniversary Remix" (C!naH); 2. "Unknown - ALNST 1st Anniversary Remix" (Rubeye & AKUGETSU)
Alien Stage 2nd Anniversary Remix Pt. 1	Released: October 7, 2024; Label: Studio Lico; Formats: Digital download, streaming; Track listing: 1. "All-In" (AKUGETSU)
Alien Stage 2nd Anniversary Remix Pt. 2	Released: October 8, 2024; Label: Studio Lico; Formats: Digital download, streaming; Track listing: 1. Cure (Rubyeye & C!naH)
Alien Stage 2nd Anniversary Remix Pt. 3	Released: October 17, 2024; Label: Studio Lico; Formats: Digital download, streaming; Track listing: 1. Ruler of My Heart (6FU;)

=== Singles ===
List of singles and year of release
Title	Year	Artist(s)
"My Clematis"	2022	Rubyeye & C!naH
"Sweet Dream"	2022	C!naH
"Unknown (Till the End...)"	2022	Akugetsu
"Black Sorrow"	2023	Park Byeong-hoon
"Ruler of My Heart"	2023	BL8M & Rubyeye
"All-In"	2023	6FU;
"Cure"	2024	Akugetsu & Park Byeong-hoon
"Love & Peace"	2024	6FU;
"Drunk & Party"	2024	6FU;
"Blink Gone"	2024	BL8M & Akugetsu
"Wiege"	2025	6FU & BL8M

== Other media ==
=== Zombie Stage ===
Zombie Stage (Korean: 좀비스테) is a South Korean animated musical series and official alternate-universe spin-off of Alien Stage, created by Vivinos and produced by Studio Format. The first installment, R O U N D 1 | Zombie Stage, premiered on the official VIVINOS YouTube channel on June 26, 2026, and attracted more than 2.7 million views within a day of release.

Unlike the original series, which depicts humans forced to compete for the entertainment of extraterrestrials, Zombie Stage takes place in an alternate setting involving a zombie outbreak. The series reimagines characters from Alien Stage as participants in a survival-based musical competition in which infected humans are exploited for entertainment. It retains the original project's combination of animated musical performances and dystopian storytelling while introducing horror elements associated with its zombie setting.

=== Anime adaptation ===
On July 2, 2026, an anime adaptation of Alien Stage was announced during the "Animate Presents: ALIEN STAGE – Live Talk & Special Announcement!" panel at Anime Expo in Los Angeles.

The announcement was made during a presentation featuring Vivinos and producer Kang. Following the panel, an official social media account confirmed that an anime series was in production.

As of October 2026, no confirmed premiere date, animation studio, or principal cast for the adaptation had been publicly established in the sources reviewed.

=== Live performances and exhibitions ===
In July 2026, a 3D concert project titled 3D LIVE ALIEN STAGE Museum in 2372 was announced as an expansion of the franchise.

The project uses three-dimensional representations of characters from the animated series in a concert-style presentation.

A showcase is scheduled to take place at the Shinagawa Prince Hotel Stellar Ball in Tokyo from October 30 to November 1, 2026. The officially announced lineup features Sua, Ivan, and Luka.

A subsequent world tour is planned for 2027, with Seoul, Tokyo, and Los Angeles identified as planned destinations. Specific dates for the tour have not yet been announced.

=== Publications ===
An official Korean-language art book was published by Dasan Books.

In February 2025, Tokyopop announced that it had licensed an English-language edition of the book.

The English edition, Alien Stage: The Art Book, was published on March 3, 2026. The 320-page hardcover includes character profiles, concept illustrations, production materials, and commentary from the creators.

A deluxe edition was also released, featuring an additional drawing book, character prints, and other supplementary materials.

== Reception ==
Alien Stage developed an international audience through its distribution on YouTube and the circulation of its music and illustrations online.

In September 2026, Frontier Works, a company involved in the project's live entertainment activities, reported that the VIVINOS YouTube channel had surpassed 3.5 million subscribers and 400 million cumulative views. These figures refer to the channel rather than necessarily to Alien Stage videos alone.

Coverage of the series has emphasized its combination of original music, short-form storytelling, and a survival-competition narrative. Its international popularity has contributed to the franchise's expansion into books, live performances, and an announced anime adaptation.
