= Asia Star Entertainer Awards =

South Korean awards ceremony

- Previous: Asia Star Entertainer Awards 2026; May 16–17, 2026; Pending: Asia Star Entertainer Awards 2027; TBA
- Native name: 아시아 스타 엔터테이너 어워즈
- Awarded for: Outstanding achievements in the music industry
- Country: South Korea
- Presented by: Newsen; @Style
- First award: April 10, 2024; 2 years ago
- Website: www.asea.kr/en

Asia Star Entertainer Awards (Korean: 아시아 스타 엔터테이너 어워즈; abbreviated as ASEA) is an awards ceremony hosted by South Korean media outlets Newsen and @Style and organized by the ASEA Organizing Committee and Japan's Zozotown to honor K-pop artists who have achieved significant results on the global stage.

== History ==
On January 16, 2024, The ASEA Organizing Committee introduced ASEA as the award ceremony where top stars representing Asia will appear and become one with fans around the world through music. The 1st Asia Star Entertainer Awards 2024 was launched in Tokyo on April 10 and broadcast live through Naver TV.

== Ceremonies ==
Edition	Date	Venue	City	Host	Ref.
1	April 10, 2024	K-Arena Yokohama	Yokohama (Note: Promoted as Tokyo.)	Kwon Yu-ri, Ok Taec-yeon	
2	May 28–29, 2025	K-Arena Yokohama	Yokohama	Juyeon, Rei (Day 1); Kim Hye-yoon, Hyungwon, Younghoon (Day 2)	
3	May 16–17, 2026	Belluna Dome	Saitama	Hyungwon, Rei (Day 1); Lee Sung-kyung, Max Changmin (Day 2)	

== Award categories ==
Daesang

- The Grand Prize
- Album of the Year
- Artist of the Year
- Song of the Year
- Record of the Year
- Performance of the Year

Bonsang

- The Platinum
- Platinum of World Wide

Genre-specific prizes

- The Best OST
- The Best Stage
- The Best Performance
- The Best Hip Hop
- The Best Rock Ballad
- The Best Trot

Popularity prizes

- Fan Choice Artist
- Fan Choice Rookie
- Fan Choice Character
- Fan Choice Couple

Other prizes

- Global Rising Actor
- Global K-Pop Leader
- The Best Artist (Actor & Singer)
- The Best Group
- The Best Solo
- The Best Band
- The Best Vocal Group
- The Best Visual Artist
- The Best Conceptual Artist
- The Best Touring Artist
- The Best New Artist (Actor & Singer)
- The Best Star
- The Best Star Japan
- Hot Trend
- Hot Icon
- Producer

== Winners ==
=== Grand Prize (Daesang) ===
Year	Category					
Year	The Grand Prize	Artist of the Year	Song of the Year	Album of the Year	Record of the Year	Performance of the Year
2024	Stray Kids	Tomorrow X Together	Jung Kook – "Seven"	Stray Kids – Rock-Star	—N/a	
2025	—N/a	Aespa	Aespa – "Supernova"	Enhypen – Romance: Untold	I-dle	Zerobaseone
2026	—N/a	Enhypen	Blackpink – "Jump"	Enhypen – Desire: Unleash	Ateez	&Team

=== Platinum (Bonsang) ===
Year	Winner
2024	Tomorrow X Together
2025	Enhypen, Aespa, NiziU, Zerobaseone, NCT Wish, Timelesz, Ive, The Boyz, I-dle, &Team, Sakurazaka46
2026	Enhypen, &Team, Alpha Drive One, Cutie Street, Fruits Zipper, Ive, Hearts2hearts, TVXQ, Ateez, The Rampage from Exile Tribe
