= Haruka Sakuraba =

Japanese model and singer (born 2006)

- 桜庭 遥花
- Born: 29 January 2006 (age 20)
- Occupations: Model; singer
- Years active: 2023–present
- Employer: Asobisystem
- Musical career
- Instrument: Vocals
- Label: Kawaii Lab.
- Member of: Cutie Street; PiKi

Haruka Sakuraba (桜庭 遥花, Sakuraba Haruka; born 29 January 2006) is a Japanese model and singer from Hokkaido, affiliated with Asobisystem. After finishing in 19th place in Produce 101 Japan The Girls, she was hired as a regular model for Larme and later appeared on Ultra Teens Fes and Kansai Collection. She is also a member of the idol groups Cutie Street and PiKi.

== Early life and career ==
Sakuraba, a native of Iwamizawa, Hokkaido, was born on 29 January 2006. During her youth, she was struggling through what she called "a really tough time" when she became interested in idols, recalling in an interview that she was "captivated by their strength and looked up to them so much that she" decided to become one. In particular, she often listened to the Itzy song "Dalla Dalla" as a source of emotional support at the time. She participated as one of the trainees in the 2023 series Produce 101 Japan The Girls, finishing in 19th place.

In March 2024, Sakuraba made her magazine debut in Larme 's 60th issue, marking her first media appearance since Produce 101. That same month, she made her runway debut at Ultra Teens Fes, wearing "a lovely pink outfit lavishly adorned with ribbons" and "amplif[ying] her already cute aura to the max" with a set of rabbit ears. In June 2024, she was hired as one of Larme's regular models, and she was the 61st issue's cover model; Model Press remarked of her appearance: "Clad in a custom-made, original sakurairo-pink dress created just for her, she perfectly embodies the magazine's sweet and adorable aesthetic".

In August 2024, Sakuraba appeared at Kansai Collection 2024 Autumn and Winter, wearing a dress accented with lace and velour alongside a set of cat ears and a cat tail and dancing to Fruits Zipper song "New Kawaii" (a performance Model Press said was done with "an abundance of charm and charisma") In September 2024, she held a "Cutest Me Ever" fashion campaign in collaboration with Sapporo Parco. On 29 January 2025 (her 19th birthday), Lcode released Courage, a brand of coloured contact lenses made in collaboration with Sakuraba.

In June 2024, Sakuraba joined Asobisystem. In July 2024, she joined Cutie Street, which is part of the agency's idol project Kawaii Lab.; she is the group's youngest member. On 21 June 2025, she formed the unit PiKi with Fruits Zipper member Karen Matsumoto. On 25 July 2025, it was announced that she would take a brief hiatus from Cutie Street activities for the rest of the month due to health concerns.

While appearing on Produce 101 Japan The Girls, Sakuraba dropped out of high school due to low attendance. She then attended an online high school to obtain her diploma, and graduated in March 2025.
