= Happy Death Day (song) =

Single by Xdinary Heroes
- Language: Korean
- Released: December 6, 2021
- Genre: K-pop; rock
- Length: 3:40
- Label: Studio J; JYP
- Songwriters: Shim Eun-ji; Lee Hae-sol; Jungsu; Gaon
- Producers: Shim Eun-ji; Lee Hae-sol

Xdinary Heroes singles chronology
"Happy Death Day" (2021)	"Test Me" (2022)

Music video
- "Happy Death Day" on YouTube

"Happy Death Day" is the debut single by the South Korean rock band Xdinary Heroes. The song was released by Studio J and JYP Entertainment on December 6, 2021.

== Background and release ==
On November 1, 2021, JYP Entertainment released a teaser titled "Heroes Are Coming" hinting at a new group to debut. A week later, on November 8, the logo and name of the group were revealed and the group's official social media accounts were launched. Jooyeon was officially announced as the group's first member, followed by O.de, Gaon, Jun Han, Jungsu, and Gunil from November 15–20. On November 22–27, teasers were released revealing the positions of the members. On December 5, a teaser for the music video were released by JYP. The single alongside its music video were released the next day.

== Composition ==
"Happy Death Day" is written and composed by the band's members Jungsu and Gaon, along with Shim Eun-ji, and Lee Hae-sol. Shim and Lee handled the arrangement of the song. According to the Gunil, the lyrics are about "the irony of encountering the harsh truth on the happiest and most celebrated day of the year, a person's birthday." The song was composed in the key of A minor, with a tempo of 130 beats per minute.

== Promotion ==
The band held a debut showcase to officially commence the promotions of the single. The single was also performed by the band in three music programs: KBS's Music Bank, MBC's Show! Music Core, and SBS's Inkigayo.

== Commercial performance ==
"Happy Death Day" debuted at number 12 on the Billboard World Digital Song Sales chart.

== Track listing ==
- Digital download / streaming
1. "Happy Death Day" – 3:40
2. "Happy Death Day" (instrumental) – 3:40

== Credits and personnel ==
Credits adopted from Melon.

Studios

- JYPE Studios — digital editing, recording, mixing
- Quincy Jones — recording
- Lead Sound Studio — recording
- Honey Butter Studio — mastering

Personnel

- Gunil — drums, background vocals
- Jungsu — lyricist, composition, keyboard, vocals, background vocals
- Gaon — lyricist, composition, electric guitar, vocals, rap, background vocals
- O.de — keyboard, vocals, rap, background vocals
- Jun Han — electric guitar, vocals, background vocals
- Jooyeon — bass, vocals, background vocals
- Lee Hae-sol — lyricist, composition, arrangement, electric guitar, sessions computer programming, recording
- Shim Eun-ji — lyricist, composition, arrangement, keyboard, vocal directing
- Lee Sang-yeop — recording
- Eom Chan-yong — recording
- Lee Tae-sub — mixing
- Park Jeong-eon — mastering

== Charts ==
Chart performance for "Happy Death Day"
Chart (2021)	Peak position
US World Digital Song Sales (Billboard)	12

== Release history ==
Release history and formats for "Happy Death Day"
Region	Date	Format	Label
Various	December 6, 2021	Digital download; streaming	Studio J; JYP
