= Overload (EP) =

- Digital cover

EP by Xdinary Heroes
- Released: November 11, 2022
- Genre: K-pop; rock; metal
- Length: 22:31
- Language: Korean
- Label: JYP; Studio J

Xdinary Heroes chronology
Hello, World! (2022)	Overload (2022)	Deadlock (2023)

Singles from Overload
- 1. "Hair Cut" Released: November 11, 2022

Overload is the second extended play by South Korean rock band Xdinary Heroes. It is released by Studio J and JYP Entertainment on November 11, 2022. The EP is the second release of the band in 2022. The extended play features six original tracks, including the lead single "Hair Cut".

== Background and release ==
On September 16, the band announced that they will release their second extended play Overload on November 4. A month later, on October 17 and 18, the band released spoiler images hinting the concept of their upcoming EP. On October 19, the promotional schedule was released. On October 22, the instrumental sampler video was released. On October 30, the highlight film was released. On October 30, JYP Entertainment announced the postponement of the album due to the national mourning period following the Itaewon Halloween crowd crush incident that happened a day earlier. On November 6, JYP Entertainment announced Overload would be released on November 11. The music video teasers for lead single "Hair Cut" was released on November 8 and 9. On November 11, the EP was released alongside the music video for "Hair Cut".

== Composition ==
Overload consists of six original tracks written and composed by the band. As described by the band, Overload is an EP with deep rock sound with songs revolving in the theme "conflict from within". The lead single "Hair Cut," contains minimal bass riff and the lyrics "liken negative thoughts to hair and the willingness of the person to cut the darkness that blocks their vision". "Lunatic" is a song that "embodies the sense of justice that the world demands from heroes". Meanwhile, "Crack in the Mirror" is a rock song with lyrics about "looking at the multi-layered self and the confusion experienced during the process of growth". The fifth track "Ghost" is a song "that talks about the voices inside a person's head that made them doubt themselves". The last track "X-mas" depicts the "emotions and confusion felt when looking in the mirror".

== Promotion ==
On November 11, the band held a showcase for their new album as the start of their promotions for Overload.

== Commercial performance ==
Overload debuted at number five on South Korea's Circle Album Chart issue dated November 6–12, 2022. The EP also debuted at number 14 on the Billboard World Albums Chart.

== Track listing ==
Track listing for Overload
No.	Title	Lyrics	Music	Arrangement	Length
1.	"Zzz.." (잠꼬대)	Shim Eun-ji; Gunil; Jungsu; Gaon; O.de; Jun Han	Shim Eun-ji; Lee Hae-sol; Gunil; Jungsu; Gaon; O.de; Jun Han; Jooyeon	Lee Hae-sol	3:35
2.	"Hair Cut"	Shim Eun-ji; Gunil; Jungsu; Gaon; O.de; Jun Han; Jooyeon	Shim Eun-ji; Lee Hae-sol; Gunil; Jungsu; Gaon; O.de; Jun Han; Jooyeon	Lee Hae-sol	3:25
3.	"Lunatic"	Selah; Emily Kim; Gunil; Jungsu; Gaon	Selah; Emily Kim; Gunil; Jungsu; Gaon	Selah	3:44
4.	"Crack in the Mirror"	Shim Eun-ji	Aron Kim; Isaac Han; Studio OPC; Ashe Ahn; Yoo Young Lee; Gunil; Jungsu; Gaon; O.de; Jooyeon	Aron Kim; Isaac Han; Ashe Ahn; Yoo Young Lee	2:40
5.	"Ghost"	Selah	Lee Woo-min "collapsedone"; Jungsu; Gaon; O.de; Jooyeon	Lee Woo-min "collapsedone"	2:36
6.	"X-mas"	Kevin Oppa (Solcire); Song Hee-jin (Solcire); Jungsu; Jooyeon	Kevin Oppa (Solcire); Song Hee-jin (Solcire); Jungsu; Gaon; O.de; Jooyeon	Kevin Oppa (Solcire)	3:03
7.	"Hair Cut" (Inst.)		Shim Eun-ji; Lee Hae-sol	Lee Hae-sol	3:25
Total length:					22:31

== Charts ==
=== Weekly charts ===
Weekly chart performance for Overload
Chart (2022)	Peak position
Polish Albums (ZPAV)	41
South Korean Albums (Circle)	5
US Heatseekers Albums (Billboard)	19
US Top Album Sales (Billboard)	74
US Top Current Album Sales (Billboard)	44
US World Albums (Billboard)	14

=== Monthly charts ===
Monthly chart performance for Overload
Chart (2022)	Peak position
South Korean Albums (Circle)	14

== Sales ==
Sales for Overload
Region	Sales
South Korea	82,469

== Release history ==
Release history for Overload
Region	Date	Format	Label
Various	November 11, 2022	Digital download; streaming	Studio J; JYP
South Korea	November 11, 2022	CD	Studio J; JYP
United States	November 11, 2022	CD	Studio J; JYP
