= Deadlock (EP) =

- Digital cover

EP by Xdinary Heroes
- Released: April 26, 2023
- Genre: K-pop; rock
- Length: 23:00
- Language: Korean
- Label: JYP; Studio J

Xdinary Heroes chronology
Overload (2022)	Deadlock (2023)

Singles from Deadlock
- 1. "Freakin' Bad" Released: April 26, 2023

Deadlock is the third extended play by South Korean rock band Xdinary Heroes. It was released by Studio J and JYP Entertainment on April 26, 2023. The extended play features seven original tracks, including the lead single "Freakin' Bad".

== Background and release ==
On March 6, 2023, the band announced that they plan to release a new album on April. On March 31, Xdinary Heroes announced an album showcase for their upcoming album. On April 7, the band announced their third EP, Deadlock set to be released on April 26. On April 8, the promotional schedule for the EP was released. The EP's tracklist was released on April 9. On April 10, a live instrumental sampler video and a lyric spoiler was released. On April 11–16, teaser images for the EP were released. Visual samplers were released on April 17 and 18. Two music video teasers for the lead single "Freakin' Bad" were released by JYP on April 20 and 21. The EP's highlight film sampler were released on April 23. The EP alongside the music video for "Freakin' Bad" was released on the 26th.

== Composition ==
Deadlock consists of seven original tracks written and composed by the band. According to Gaon, the EP's title was derived from the computer term "deadlock." The overall theme of the EP is "the chaos that someone experiences as the inner good and evil reach a stalemate that cannot be yielded to each other."

The first track, "Come Into My Head", is a song that incorporates the genres of EDM and hip hop. The second track and the lead single, "Freakin' Bad", features 808 bass with lyrics that captures "the many worries between hero and villain" and "the message to get out of the world that separates good from evil." The third track, "Bicycle", is an alternative rock song. "Checkmate" talks on "how to get through a situation where you can neither move forward nor back down." The fifth track, "Good Enough" was written by the band's leader, Gunil, and Young K of Day6. "Good Enough" is the band's first official English song. "Man in the Box" is a song with lyrics about people who chose to "live in their own world," eventually turning into "monsters." The last track, "Dear H.", is a pop ballad song with lyrics about "the painful feelings caused by wounds that people find difficult share with others."

== Promotion ==
On April 22 and 23, the band held a showcase for their new EP as the start of their promotions for Deadlock.

== Track listing ==
Track listing for Deadlock
No.	Title	Lyrics	Music	Arrangement	Length
1.	"Come Into My Head"	Shim Eun-ji; Jungsu; Gaon; O.de; Jooyeon	Shim Eun-ji; Lee Hae-sol; Jungsu; Gaon; O.de; Jooyeon	Lee Hae-sol	3:14
2.	"Freakin' Bad"	O.de; Jun Han; Jooyeon; Song Hee-jin (Solcire); Kevin Oppa (Solcire)	O.de; Jun Han; Jooyeon; Song Hee-jin (Solcire); Kevin Oppa (Solcire); Young Won-hee (Solcire)	Kevin Oppa (Solcire); Young Won-hee (Solcire)	3:03
3.	"Bicycle"	Jungsu; O.de; Jun Han; Song Hee-jin (Solcire)	Jungsu; O.de; Jun Han; Song Hee-jin (Solcire); Yipro (Solcire); Mogt (Solcire)	Yipro (Solcire); Mogt (Solcire)	3:10
4.	"Checkmate"	Jungsu; Gaon; Selah	Selah; Jungsu; Gaon	Selah	3:27
5.	"Good Enough"	Young K; Gunil	Shim Eun-ji; Lee Hae-sol; Jungsu; Jooyeon	Shim Eun-ji; Lee Hae-sol	3:57
6.	"Man in the Box"	Shim Eun-ji; Gunil; Gaon; Jooyeon	Shim Eun-ji; Lee Hae-sol; Gunil; Gaon; Jooyeon	Lee Hae-sol	3:09
7.	"Dear H."	Jun Han; Song Hee-jin (Solcire); Kevin Oppa (Solcire)	Jungsu; Jun Han; Jooyeon; Song Hee-jin (Solcire); Kevin Oppa (Solcire)	Kevin Oppa (Solcire)	2:57
Total length:					23:00

== Credits and personnel ==
Studios

- JYPE Studios — recording (tracks 1–6), digital editing (tracks 1, 4, 5, 6), mixing (tracks 2, 3, 5, 7)
- Solcire Studio — recording (tracks 2, 3, 7), digital editing (tracks 2, 3, 7)
- Quincy Jones — recording (tracks 1, 5, 6,)
- Studio-T — recording (track 5)
- Glab Studios — mixing (tracks 1, 4, 6)
- 821 Sound Mastering — mastering (tracks 1, 3–7)
- Sterling Sound — mastering (track 2)

Personnel

- Gunil — lyricist (tracks 5, 6), composition (track 6), drums (all tracks)
- Jungsu — lyricist (tracks 1, 3, 4) composition (tracks 1, 3, 4, 5, 7), keyboard (all tracks), vocals (all tracks), background vocals (tracks 1–6)
- Gaon — lyricist (tracks 1, 4, 6), composition (tracks 1, 4, 6), electric guitar (all tracks), vocals (all tracks), rap (all tracks), background vocals (tracks 2, 3)
- O.de — lyricist (tracks 1, 2, 3), composition (tracks 1, 2, 3), keyboard (all tracks), vocals (all tracks), rap (all tracks), background vocals (tracks 2, 3)
- Jun Han — lyricist (tracks 2, 3, 7), composition (tracks 2, 3, 7), electric guitar (all tracks), background vocals (tracks 2, 3, 5)
- Jooyeon — lyricist (tracks 1, 2, 6), composition (tracks 1, 2, 5, 6, 7), bass (all tracks), vocals (all tracks), background vocals (tracks 1–6)
- Lee Hae-sol — composition (tracks 1, 5, 6), arrangement (tracks 1, 5, 6), electric guitar (tracks 1, 6), sessions computer programming (tracks 1, 5, 6), recording (track 1,)
- Shim Eun-ji — lyricist (tracks 1, 6), composition (tracks 1, 5, 6), arrangement (track 5)
- Song Hee-jin (Solcire) — lyricist (tracks 2, 3, 7), composition (tracks 2, 3, 7), editing (track 3), vocal directing (tracks 2, 3)
- Kevin Oppa (Solcire) — lyricist (tracks 2, 7), composition (tracks 2, 7), arrangement (tracks 2, 7), sessions computer programming (track 7), keyboards (track 7), editing (track 3, 7), recording (track 7), vocal directing (tracks 2, 7)
- Selah — lyricist (track 4), composition (track 4), arrangement (track 4), sessions computer programming (track 4)
- Young K — lyricist (track 5)
- Young Hee-young (Solcire) — composition (track 2)
- Young Won-hee (Solcire) — arrangement (track 2), sessions computer programming (track 2)
- Yipro (Solcire) — composition (track 3), arrangement (track 3), sessions computer programming (track 3), keyboards (track 3)
- Mogt (Solcire) — composition (track 3), arrangement (track 3), sessions computer programming (track 3)
- Jung So-ri — electric guitar (track 2), guitar directing (track 2)
- Jin Seung-woo — electric guitar (track 3), guitar directing (track 3)
- Cha Il-hoon — guitar directing (tracks 2, 3, 7)
- Kim Ki-yoon — guitar directing (tracks 2, 3, 7)
- Hong Pil-seong — acoustic guitar (track 5), electric guitar (track 5)
- Park Geun — electric guitar (track 7), guitar directing (track 7)
- On The String — strings (track 5)
- Lee Na-il — strings arrangement (track 5)
- Lim Chan-mi — recording (tracks 1, 3, 4, 5, 6)
- Goo Hye-jin — recording (tracks 1–4, 6, 7)
- Lee Tae-sop — recording (tracks 2, 3), mixing (tracks 2, 3, 5, 7)
- Park Eun-jung — recording (track 5)
- Hae Hae-sol — recording (tracks 5, 6)
- Oh Seong-keun — recording (track 5)
- Seo Eu-nil — recording (track 6)
- Park Nam-joon — sound engineering (tracks 1, 4, 6)
- Shin Bong-won — mixing (tracks 1, 4, 6)
- Kwon Nam-woo — mastering (tracks 1, 3–7)
- Ted Jensen — mastering (track 2)

== Charts ==
=== Weekly charts ===
Weekly chart performance for Deadlock
Chart (2023)	Peak position
Hungarian Albums (MAHASZ)	34
South Korean Albums (Circle)	8

=== Monthly charts ===
Monthly chart performance for Deadlock
Chart (2023)	Peak position
South Korean Albums (Circle)	16

== Sales ==
Sales for Deadlock
Region	Sales
South Korea	131,871

== Release history ==
Release history for Deadlock
Region	Date	Format	Label
South Korea	April 26, 2023	CD	Studio J; JYP
Various	April 26, 2023	Digital download; streaming	Studio J; JYP
