= Voyager (Xdinary Heroes song) =

Single by Xdinary Heroes

from the EP Dead And
- Language: Korean
- Released: April 17, 2026
- Length: 3:55
- Label: JYP
- Composers: Collapsedone, Gunil, Jungsu, Gaon, O.de, Jun Han, Jooyeon
- Lyricists: Gunil, Jungsu, Gaon, O.de, Jun Han, Jooyeon, Collapsedone, Young-Hu Kim

Xdinary Heroes singles chronology
"X room" (2026)	"Voyager" (2026)

Music video
- "Voyager" on YouTube

"Voyager" is a song recorded by South Korean boy band Xdinary Heroes for their eighth extended play Dead And. It was released by JYP Entertainment as a single on April 17, 2026.

== Background and release ==
On March 23, JYP Entertainment posted the track list for Xdinary Heroes eighth EP Dead And in which "Voyager" was revealed to be the lead single. On March 30, JYP Entertainment released a mood film for the comeback on its social media accounts. On March 31, JYP then first began posting concept photos for the release on all their social media platforms. The music video teasers were released on April 15 and 16, the video was released the next day alongside the EP and was directed by SUIKO (Koinrush).

== Composition ==
"Voyager" was written by Gunil, Jungsu, Gaon, O.de, Jun Han, Jooyeon, Collapsedone, Young-Hu Kim and composed by Collapsedone, Gunil, Jungsu, Gaon, O.de, Jun Han and Jooyeon. "Voyager" is inspired by NASA’s Voyager 1 spacecraft — a probe continuing its journey through space even as it nears the limits of communication. The song is composed in the key F sharp major and has 130 beats per minute and a running time of 3 minutes and 55 seconds.

We thought about the death of stars first, When a star dies, it doesn’t just disappear — it creates something new. We wondered what kind of an observer could represent that idea, and Voyager 1 felt like something we could relate to.

— Gaon on the inspiration behind the song.

== Promotion ==
Xdinary Heroes first performed "Voyager" on Mnet M Countdown show on April 23. Xdinary Heroes also performed on three other music programs in the first week of promotion: Music Bank on April 24 Show! Music Core, on April 25 and SBS's Inkigayo on April 26.

== Charts ==
=== Weekly charts ===
Weekly chart performance for "Voyager"
Chart (2026)	Peak positions
South Korea Download (Circle)	98

=== Monthly chart ===
Chart (April 2026)	Peak position
South Korea Download (Circle)	166

== Release history ==
Release history
Region	Date	Format	Label
Various	April 17, 2026	Digital download; streaming	JYP
