= Sweet Steady =

Japanese idol girl group

- Origin: Japan
- Genre: J-pop
- Years active: 2024–present
- Label: Kawaii Lab.
- Members: Ayu Okuda; Yui Otoi; Natsuka Kurita; Rise Shiokawa; Nagisa Shoji; Mayumi Shiraishi; Sakina Yamauchi
- Past members: Mia Yanagawa
- Website: sweetsteady.asobisystem.com

Sweet Steady (stylized in all caps) is a Japanese girl group that formed in 2024. They debuted with the digital single "Hajimari no Aizu" in March 2024.

== History ==
=== 2024: Formation and debut ===
The formation of Kawaii Lab.'s third girl group, Sweet Steady, was announced on January 23, 2024. The initial eight member line-up would consist only of promoted trainees from Kawaii Lab. Mates, one of which; Ayu Okoda was an original member of Kawaii Lab.'s first girl group Idolater. They released their debut digital single, "Hajimari no Aizu", on March 1, followed by their second, "Heart no Mahō", on March 20. In April, they released two more digitals singles; "Nantene!" on April 5 and "Michishirube" on April 14. Their fifth digital single, "Call me, Tell me", was released on May 24. They released their sixth digital single, "Pajama Party!", on June 10. On July 10, their seventh digital single, "Onegai Pentas", was released. On July 13, Mia Yanagawa withdrew from the group. Their eighth digital single, "Shinsekai Crescendo", was released on August 27.

Sweet Steady released their double A-side debut maxi single, "Pajama Party! / Diamond Days", on December 18.

== Members ==
=== Current ===
- Ayu Okuda (奥田彩友)
- Yui Otoi (音井結衣)
- Natsuka Kurita (栗田なつか)
- Rise Shiokawa (塩川莉世)
- Nagisa Shoji (庄司なぎさ)
- Mayumi Shiraishi (白石まゆみ)
- Sakina Yamauchi (山内咲奈)

=== Former ===
- Mia Yanagawa (柳川みあ)

== Discography ==
=== Singles ===
Title	Year	Peak chart positions		Certifications	Album
Title	Year	JPN	JPN Hot	Certifications	Album
"Hajimari no Aizu" (始まりの合図)	2024	—	—		Non-album singles
"Heart no Mahō" (ハートの魔法)	2024	—	—		Non-album singles
"Nantene!" (なんてねっ！)	2024	—	—		Non-album singles
"Michishirube" (ミチシルベ)	2024	—	—		Non-album singles
"Call Me, Tell Me"	2024	—	—		Non-album singles
"Onegai Pentas" (おねがいペンタス)	2024	—	—		Non-album singles
"Shinsekai Crescendo" (新世界クレッシェンド)	2024	—	—		Non-album singles
"Pajama Party!" (ぱじゃまぱーてぃー！) (Note: "Pajama Party!" was initially released as a digital single on June 10, 2024, but when later re-released as part of the double A-side maxi-single "Pajama Party! / Diamond Days" on December 18, 2024)	2024	2	28		Non-album singles
"Diamond Days" (ダイヤモンドデイズ)	2024	2	—		Non-album singles
"Yakimochi"	2025	2	5		Non-album singles
"Good Job!" (ぐっじょぶ!)	2025	2	—		Non-album singles
"Fanfare" (ファンファーレ)	2025	—	—		Non-album singles
"Sweet Steady Time" (すいすてたいむ)	2025	—	—		Non-album singles
"Kawaii Collection" (カワイイコレクション)	2025	—	—		Non-album singles
"Sweet Step"	2026	2	7	RIAJ: Platinum (phy.)	Non-album singles
"Like a Gerbera" (ガーベラの花のように)	2026	—	—		Non-album singles
"Tobikiri Dramatica" (とびきりドラマティカ)	2026	—	—		Non-album singles
"Kowa Kawaii" (気味が悪いんだからねっ)	2026	12	—		Non-album singles
"Dash!!!"	2026	—	—		Non-album singles
"So Happy!" (ちょーだいHAPPY!)	2026	—	—		Non-album singles
"Heart Rescue Me" (ハートレスキューミー)	2026	—	—		Non-album singles
"—" denotes releases that did not chart or were not released in that region.
