= Musubizm =

Japanese idol group

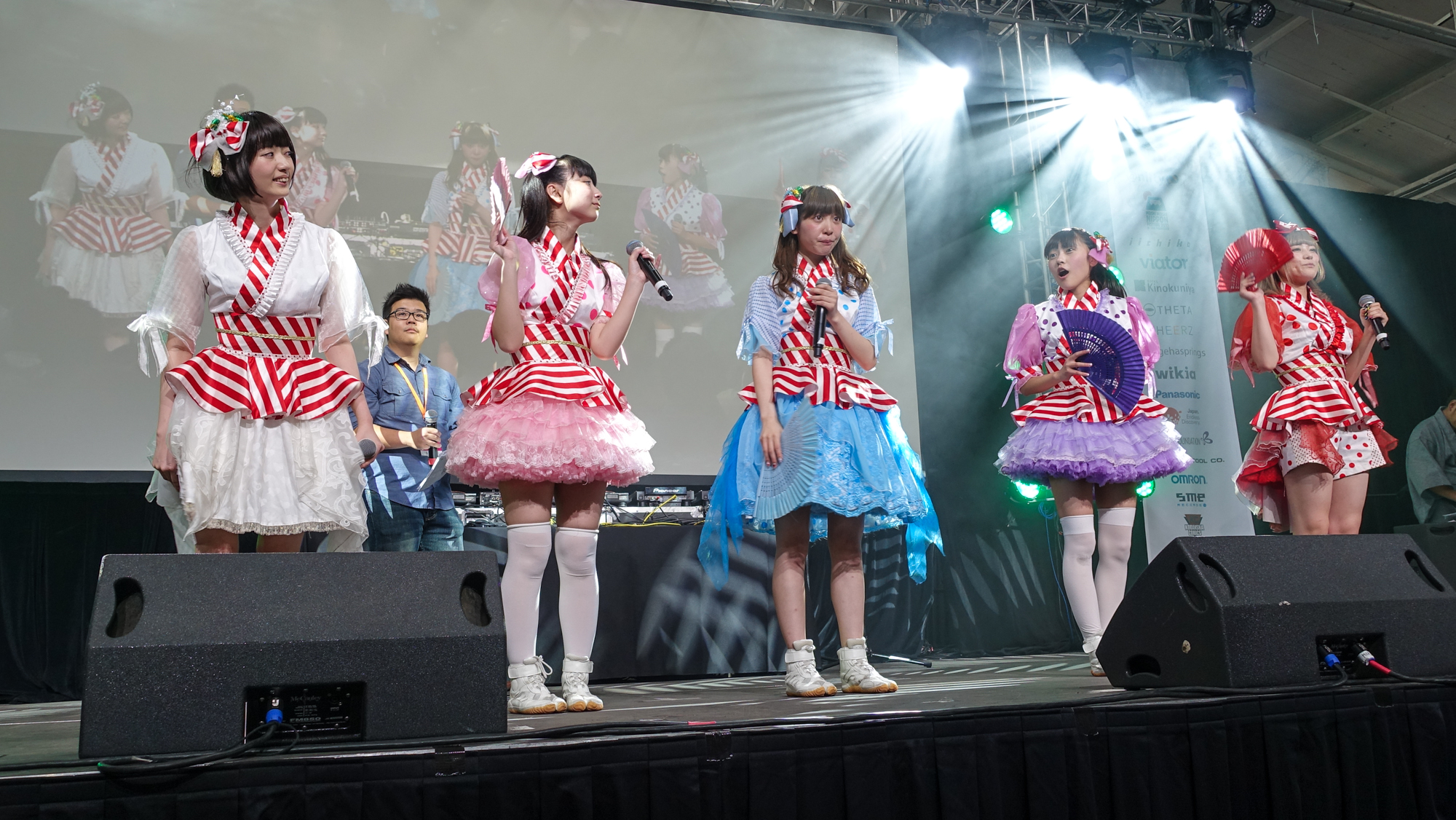

Background information
- Origin: Japan
- Genres: J-pop
- Years active: 2014–2017
- Labels: Asobisystem
- Past members: Misa Kimura; Uni Wada; Eru Shiina; Nami Yamada; Mai Imai; Rurika Miyajima
- Website: musubizm.asobisystem.com

Musubizm (むすびズム, Musubizumu) was a Japanese girl group of made up of fashion models that formed in 2014. They were managed by Asobisystem having debuted in July 2016 and disbanded in December 2017.

== About ==
Musubizum was formed on December 19, 2014, with a six member line-up made up of Misa Kimura, Uni Wada, Eru Shiina, Nami Yamada, Mai Imai, and Rurika Miyajima. The members were chosen from candidates of Asobisystem Idol Project. Uni Wada left the group on April 30, 2015.

They released their debut single, "Mae wo Muke", on July 5, 2016. Their second single, "Mahō no Kagi wo Te ni Iretara", was released on November 15. They held their first concert at WWW in Shibuya on December 19.

They held their second concert at Harajuku Astro Hall on March 31, 2017, and their third concert at the same venue on May 31. On June 27, they released their third single, "Kimi ni Mu Chu XX". Their fourth concert was held at Harajuku Astro Hall on July 31. They released their fourth single, "Koi no Senshi", on November 21. Musubizm disbanded on December 10, 2017, after their final concert at Selene B2 in Minato.

== Members ==
Final line-up

- Misa Kimura (木村ミサ)
- Eru Shiina (椎名エル)
- Nami Yamada (山田なみ)
- Mai Imai (今井マイ)
- Rurika Miyajima (宮島るりか)

Past members

- Uni Wada (和田うに)

== Discography ==
=== Singles ===
| Title | Year | Peak chart positions | | Album |
| Title | Year | Oricon | Billboard | Album |
|---|---|---|---|---|
| "Mae wo Muke" (マエヲムケ!) | 2016 | 20 | 94 | Non-album singles |
| "Mahō no Kagi wo Te ni Iretara" (まほうのカギを手に入れたら) | 2016 | 17 | 56 | Non-album singles |
| "Kimi ni Mu Chu XX" (キミに夢CHU♡XX) | 2017 | 15 | 54 | Non-album singles |
| "Koi no Senshi" (恋の戦士) | 2017 | 16 | 52 | Non-album singles |
"—" denotes releases that did not chart or were not released in that region.
