= Hello, World! (EP) =

- Digital cover

EP by Xdinary Heroes
- Released: July 20, 2022
- Genre: K-pop; rock; pop rock
- Length: 20:47
- Language: Korean
- Label: JYP; Studio J

Xdinary Heroes chronology
Hello, World! (2022)	Overload (2022)

Singles from Hello, World!
- 1. "Test Me" Released: July 20, 2022; 2. "Strawberry Cake" Released: August 9, 2022

Hello, World! (stylized as Hello, world!) is the first extended play by South Korean rock band Xdinary Heroes. It was released by Studio J and JYP Entertainment on July 20, 2022. The extended play consists six tracks, including the lead single "Test Me".

== Background and release ==
In late June 2022, they released a new video entitled "How to enjoy ♭form with Xdinary Heroes". The next day, Xdinary Heroes announced their first-ever comeback with Hello, World! an extended play to be released in July 20. An instrumental sampler and highlight film were released on June 30 and July 14, respectively. In the next days, two music video teasers were unveiled revealing the storyline of the music video. The extended play alongside the music video for "Test Me" was released on July 20.

== Composition ==
Hello, World! consists of five tracks written and composed by the band. The lead single "Test Me" is synth pop-rock song with lyrics about "defiance and having the courage to say “no" to a conformist society."

== Promotion ==
On July 20, 2022, Xdinary Heroes held a comeback showcase for the new album where they performed all tracks from the Hello, World! and also their previous single "Happy Death Day". Moreover, the band also appeared in several music shows such as SBS's Inkigayo, MBC's Show! Music Core, and KBS's Music Bank. Furthermore, live clips of the band performing the songs from the album were also released. On August 9, the band released a music video for the B-side "Strawberry Cake."

== Track listing ==
Track listing for Hello, World!
No.	Title	Lyrics	Music	Arrangement	Length
1.	"Test Me"	Shim Eun-ji; Jungsu; O.de; Jun Han	Shim Eun-ji; Lee Hae-sol; Jungsu; O.de; Jun Han	Lee Hae-sol	03:19
2.	"Knock Down"	Song Hee-jin (Solcire); Garden; Jungsu; Gaon	Garden; Song Hee-jin (Solcire); Jungsu; Gaon	Garden	03:36
3.	"Sucker Punch!"	Selah; Seoha; O.de; Jun Han; Jooyeon	Selah; O.de; Jun Han; Jooyeon	Selah	03:34
4.	"Strawberry Cake"	Song Hee-jin (Solcire); Kevin Oppa (Solcire); Gunil; Jungsu; Gaon	Song Hee-jin (Solcire); Kevin Oppa (Solcire); Gunil; Jungsu; Gaon	Kevin Oppa (Solcire)	03:38
5.	"Pirates"	Song Hee-jin (Solcire); Kevin Oppa (Solcire); O.de; Jun Han; Jooyeon	Song Hee-jin (Solcire); Kevin Oppa (Solcire); O.de; Jun Han; Jooyeon	Kevin Oppa (Solcire)	03:19
6.	"Test Me" (Inst.)		Shim Eun-ji; Lee Hae-sol	Lee Hae-sol	03:19
Total length:					20:47

== Charts ==
=== Weekly charts ===
Weekly chart performance for Hello, World!
Chart (2022)	Peak position
Polish Albums (ZPAV)	28
South Korean Albums (Circle)	4

=== Monthly charts ===
Monthly chart performance for Hello, World!
Chart (2022)	Peak position
South Korean Albums (Circle)	26

== Sales ==
Sales for Hello, World!
Region	Sales
South Korea	65,494

== Release history ==
Release history for Hello, World!
Region	Date	Format	Label
South Korea	July 20, 2022	CD	Studio J; JYP
Various	July 20, 2022	Digital download; streaming	Studio J; JYP
