= Xdinary Heroes =

South Korean rock band

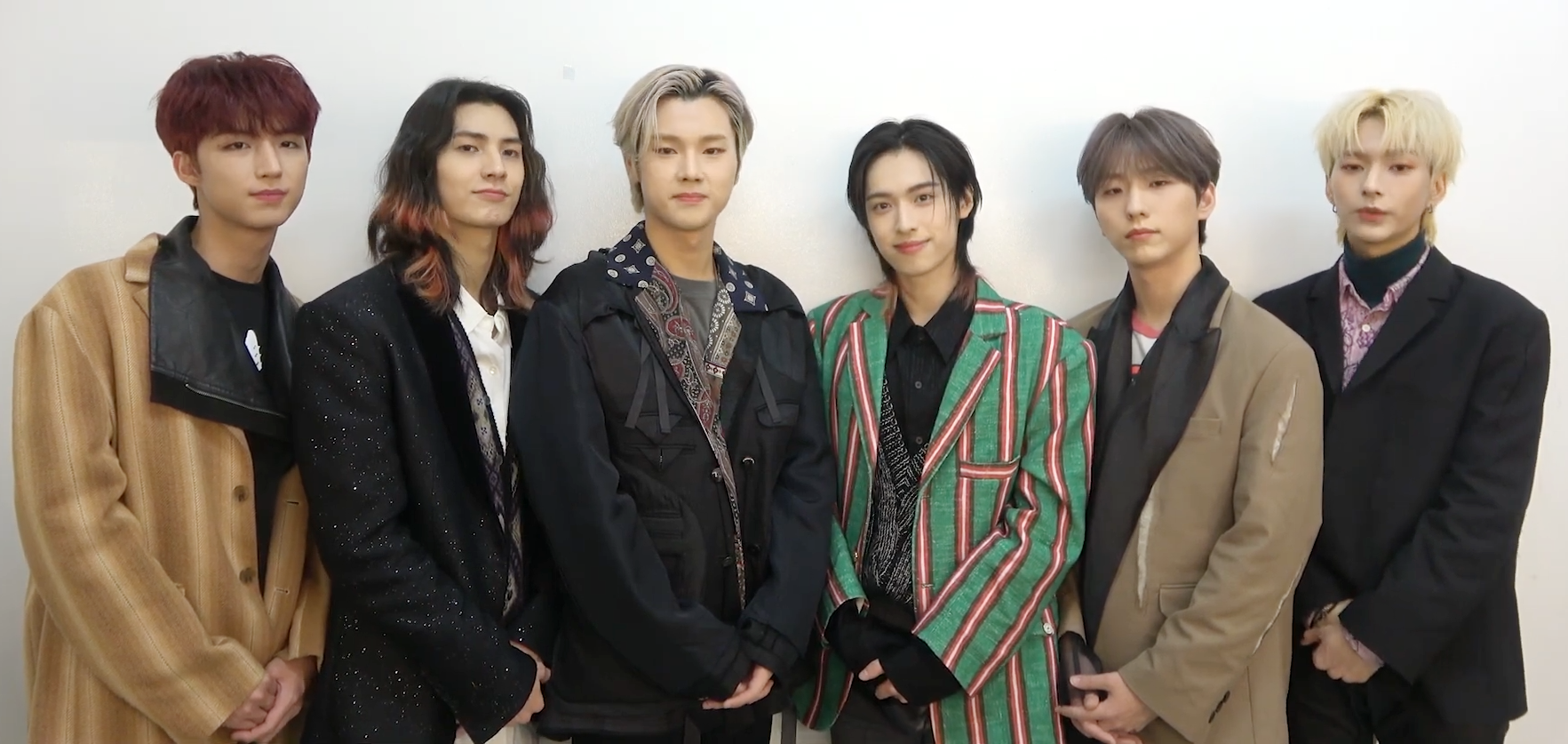
- Xdinary Heroes in 2023; From left to right: Jun Han, Jooyeon, Jungsu, Gaon, Gunil (former), and O.de

Background information
- Origin: Seoul, South Korea
- Years active: 2021–present
- Labels: Studio J; JYP; Republic
- Members: Jungsu; Gaon; O.de; Jun Han; Jooyeon
- Past members: Gunil
- Website: xdinaryheroes.jype.com

Xdinary Heroes (Korean: 엑스디너리 히어로즈) is a South Korean rock band under JYP Entertainment's sub-label, Studio J. They officially debuted on December 6, 2021, with the single "Happy Death Day". The band consists of five members: Jungsu, Gaon, O.de, Jun Han, and Jooyeon. Xdinary Heroes was originally a six-piece ensemble; Gunil left the group in August 2026. All members are involved in writing, composing, and producing the band's music. The band's name is shortened form of "Extraordinary Heroes", meaning "anyone can become a hero".

== History ==
=== 2021: Formation and debut with "Happy Death Day" ===
On November 1, JYP Entertainment released a teaser titled "Heroes Are Coming" hinting at a new group to debut. A week later, on November 8, the logo and name of the group were revealed, and the group's official social media accounts were launched. Jooyeon was officially announced as the group's first member, followed by O.de, Gaon, Jun Han, Jungsu, and Gunil from November 15–20. On November 22–27, teasers were released revealing the positions of the members, starting with Jooyeon playing the bass on November 22, followed by O.de playing the synthesizer on the November 23, Gaon playing the electric guitar on the November 24, Jun Han playing the electric guitar on the November 25, Jungsu on the keyboard on the November 26, and Gunil playing the drums on the November 27. It was revealed that Jungsu and O.de initially trained to be in a K-pop group, but were later told they would be in a band.

On December 6, Xdinary Heroes debuted with the single "Happy Death Day". The song debuted at number 12 on the Billboard World Digital Song Sales.

=== 2022: Hello, World! and Overload ===
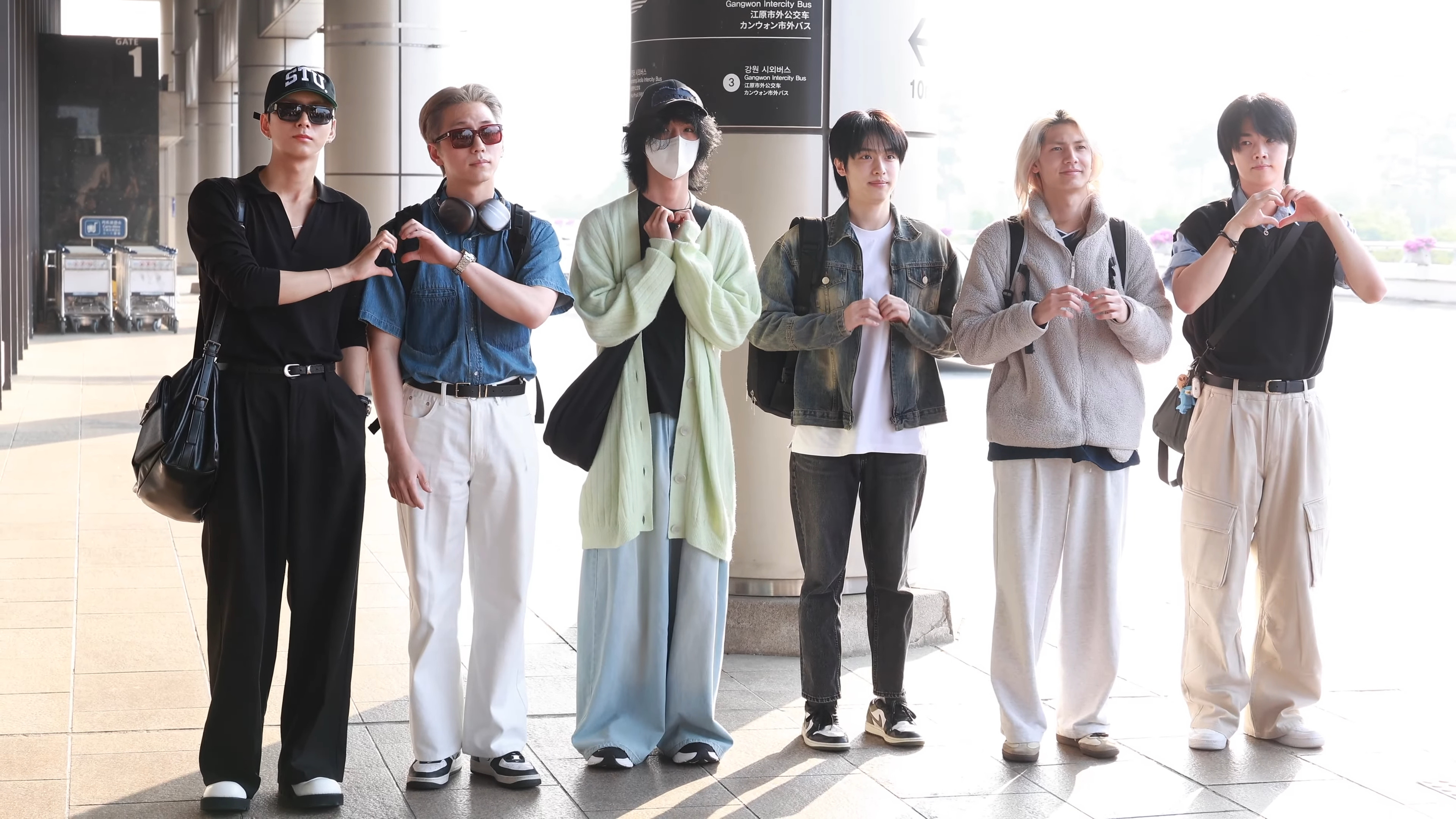
At Gimpo International Airport in May 2025: O.de, Gunil, Jun Han, Gaon, Jooyeon, and Jungsu (left to right)

On June 28, 2022, Xdinary Heroes announced they would be releasing their first extended play Hello, World! on July 20.

On September 16, the band announced their second extended play Overload, to be released on November 4. On October 19, the group announced their first solo concert "Stage ♭ : Overture" would be held on December 16–18. On October 30, it announced that Overload release would be postponed due to the national mourning period following the Itaewon Halloween crowd crush incident that happened a day earlier. On November 6, JYP Entertainment announced the group would be releasing Overload on November 11. The EP debuted at number 14 on the Billboard World Albums Chart.

=== 2023: Deadlock and Livelock ===
On March 6, 2023, the band announced that they plan to release a new album in April. On March 31, Xdinary Heroes announced an album showcase for their upcoming album. On April 7, the band announced their third EP, Deadlock, released on April 26.

On September 20, the band unveiled a trailer for their fourth EP, Livelock, which was released on October 11.

On October 6, to commemorate Livelock, Xdinary Heroes announced their first tour, the Break the Brake world tour, which began on November 3 in Seoul, South Korea, followed by shows in Europe and Asia. It concluded in Bangkok on March 31, 2024.

=== 2024: Troubleshooting, Open ♭eta series, and Live and Fall ===
On March 8, 2024, Xdinary Heroes released the single "Wego Wego" as part of the soundtrack for the webtoon Killer Peter.

On April 12, the band uploaded a teaser film for their first full-length studio album Troubleshooting, released on April 30.

From June 3 to September 9, Xdinary Heroes released the digital singles "Boy Comics", "Love and Fear", "Save Me", and "Instead!" featuring Korean rock singer Yoon Do-hyun through the "Open ♭eta" series, all of which were featured on the band's fifth EP, Live and Fall, released on October 14.

=== 2025: Beautiful Mind and Lxve to Death ===
On March 5, 2025, Xdinary Heroes unveiled a teaser for their sixth EP, Beautiful Mind, released on March 24.

To support the release of this EP, on March 24, the band announced their second world tour, the Beautiful Mind tour, which began in Seoul on May 2, and had shows throughout Asia and North America before concluding in San Jose on August 16.

On March 18, it was announced that Xdinary Heroes would be part of the lineup for Lollapalooza 2025, scheduled for July 31.

On July 2, the band announced that they would release their sixth digital single, "Fire (My Sweet Misery)", on July 7.

On July 18, Xdinary Heroes released the single "Break the Darkness" as part of the soundtrack for the drama The Nice Guy.

On September 26, the band performed at the Busan International Rock Festival. On September 27, Xdinary Heroes opened for British rock band Muse's concert 'MUSE LIVE IN KOREA' at Incheon Munhak Stadium.

Xdinary Heroes released their seventh mini album, Lxve to Death, on October 24.

=== 2026–present: Dead And and Gunil's departure ===
On March 25, the band released their pre-release single "X Room" as part of their 8th mini album, Dead And.

On April 17, Xdinary Heroes released their eighth mini album, Dead And, featuring the single "Voyager".

On August 13, JYP Entertainment terminated Gunil's contract and withdrew from the group.

== Members ==
List of members and roles.

=== Current members ===
- Jungsu (정수) – vocals, keyboards
- Gaon (가온) – rap, vocals, guitars
- O.de (오드) – rap, vocals, synthesizers, keyboards
- Jun Han (준한) – guitars, vocals
- Jooyeon (주연) – vocals, bass

=== Former member ===
- Gunil (건일) – leader, drums, vocals

== Discography ==
- Troubleshooting (2024)

== Concerts and tours ==
- 2022: Xdinary Heroes
- 2023: Break the Brake World Tour
- 2025: Beautiful Mind World Tour
- 2026: The New Xcene Special tour
- 2026: Japan Special Live "The New Xcene"

== Awards and nominations ==
Name of the award ceremony, year presented, category, nominee(s) of the award, and the result of the nomination
Award ceremony	Year	Category	Nominee(s)	Result	Ref.
Asia Star Entertainer Awards	2025	The Best Band	Xdinary Heroes	Won	
Genie Music Awards	2022	Best Male Rookie	Xdinary Heroes	Nominated	
Golden Disc Awards	2022	Rookie Artist of the Year	Xdinary Heroes	Nominated	
Hanteo Music Awards	2023	Special Award – Band	Xdinary Heroes	Won	
K-World Dream Awards	2025	Best Band Artist	Xdinary Heroes	Won	
Korea Grand Music Awards	2025	Best Artist 10	Xdinary Heroes	Won	
Korea Grand Music Awards	2025	Best Band	Xdinary Heroes	Won	
MAMA Awards	2022	Best Band Performance	"Happy Death Day"	Won	
MAMA Awards	2022	Best New Male Artist	Xdinary Heroes	Won	
MAMA Awards	2022	Artist of the Year	Xdinary Heroes	Longlisted	
MAMA Awards	2022	Song of the Year	"Happy Death Day"	Longlisted	
MAMA Awards	2023	Worldwide Fans' Choice Top 10	Xdinary Heroes	Nominated	
MAMA Awards	2024	Worldwide Fans' Choice Male	Xdinary Heroes	Nominated	
MAMA Awards	2025	Song of the Year	"Beautiful Life"	Nominated	
MAMA Awards	2025	Best Band Performance	"Beautiful Life"	Nominated	
MAMA Awards	2025	Worldwide Fans' Choice Male	Xdinary Heroes	Nominated	
Seoul Music Awards	2024	Band Award	Xdinary Heroes	Won	
Supersound Festival	2025	Band Performance	Xdinary Heroes	Won	
