= Cutie Street =

Japanese idol girl group

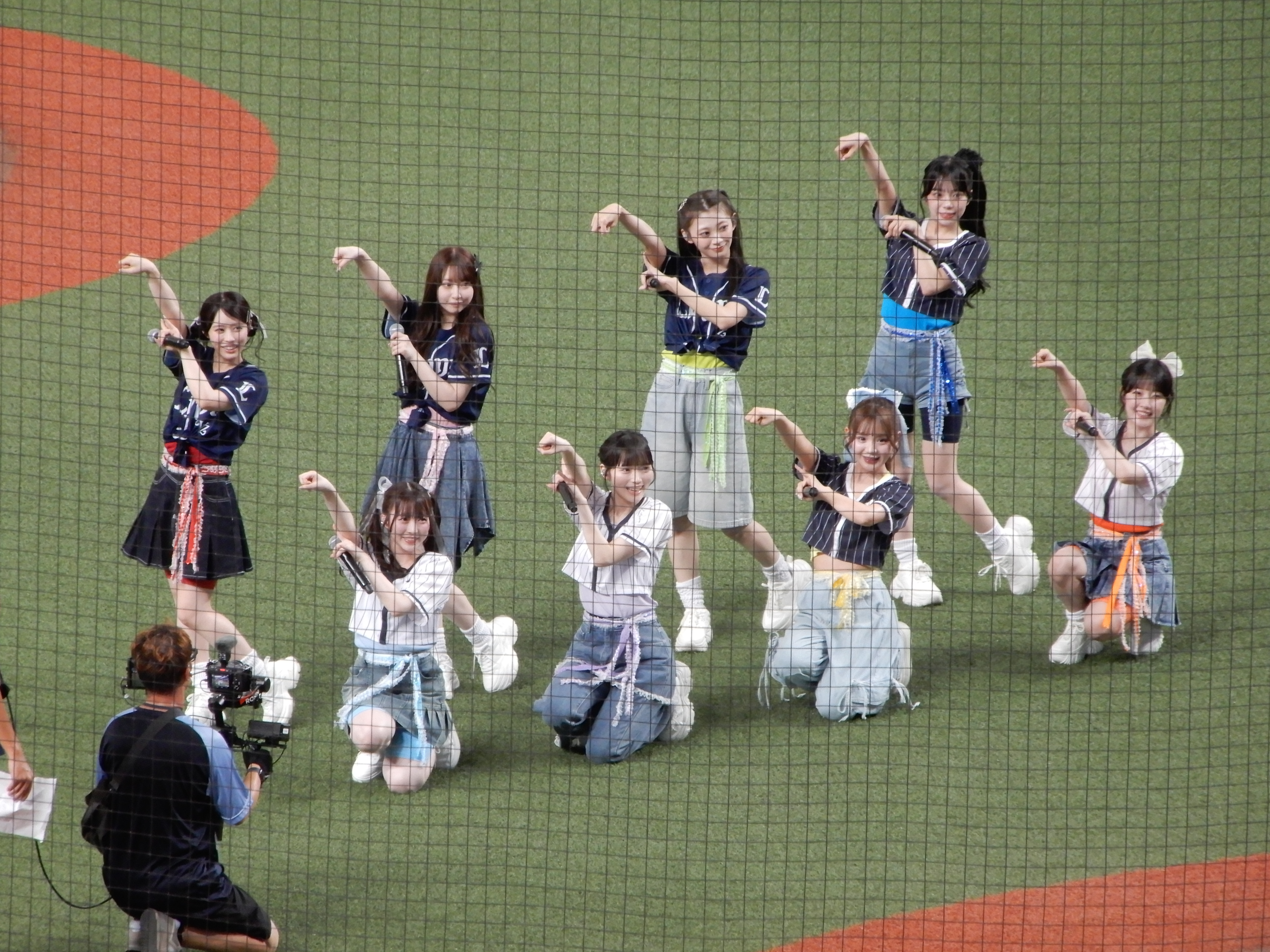
- CUTIE STREET at VARZAR×LIONS SPECIAL COLLABORATION

Background information
- Origin: Japan
- Genre: J-pop
- Years active: 2024–present
- Label: Kawaii Lab.
- Members: Risa Furusawa; Aika Sano; Kana Itakura; Ayano Masuda; Emiru Kawamoto; Miyu Umeda; Nagisa Manabe; Haruka Sakuraba
- Website: asobisystem.com/talent/cutiestreet/

Cutie Street (stylized in all caps) is a Japanese girl group that formed in 2024. They debuted with the single "Kawaii Dake ja Dame Desu ka?" in November 2024.

== History ==
=== 2024: Formation and debut ===
On July 23, 2024, Kawaii Lab. announced that they would form a new girl group. The group's name "Cutie Street" and eight members were revealed on July 30. Before joining Cutie Street, Risa Furusawa and Kana Itakura were models, Aika Sano was an actress, Ayano Masuda and Miyu Umeda were members of A♡Z (2021) and Lapilaz (2022–2023), Emiru Kawamoto was a member of Amorecarina Tokyo (2015–2016) and its sub-unit Amorecarina Cute (2015), Tokyo CuteCute (2015–2019), and HO6LA (2021–2022), and Haruka Sakuraba was a contestant on Produce 101 Japan The Girls.

They performed live for the first time at Tokyo Idol Festival 2024 on August 4. Cutie Street released their debut single "Kawaii Dake ja Dame Desu ka?" on November 13.

They held their first concert at Toyosu Pit in Tokyo on February 2, 2025. Korean Soloist Choi Yena released "사쿠란보" on November 17, 2026, a Korean remake of the original Japanese song, "Sakuranbo" by Ai Otsuka. The music video features Cutie Street.

== Members ==
- Risa Furusawa (古澤 里紗)
- Aika Sano (佐野 愛花)
- Kana Itakura (板倉 可奈)
- Ayano Masuda (増田 彩乃)
- Emiru Kawamoto (川本 笑瑠)
- Miyu Umeda (梅田 みゆ)
- Nagisa Manabe (真鍋 凪咲)
- Haruka Sakuraba (桜庭 遥花)

== Concerts ==
Year	Title	Date	Place
2024	CUTIE STREET solo LIVE - 01 STREET -	Oct. 7th	Hulic Hall Tokyo, Tokyo
2024	1st Single "Kawaii Dake ja Dame Desu ka?" Release Commemorative Live Performance	Nov. 13th	Hulic Hall Tokyo, Tokyo
2024	CUTIE STREET solo LIVE - 02 STREET-	Dec. 5th	Hulic Hall Tokyo, Tokyo
2025	CUTIE STREET 1st One-man Live Eve Celebration	Feb. 1st	Toyosu PIT, Tokyo
2025	CUTIE STREET 1st One-man Live -CROSS STREET-	Feb. 2nd	Toyosu PIT, Tokyo
2025	Sakuraba Haruka Birthday Celebration 2025	Mar, 12th	Ebisu Garden Hall, Tokyo
2025	CUTIE STREET 1stワンマンライブ -CROSS STREET- Osaka	Mar. 22nd	Zepp Namba, Osaka
2025	Kawamoto Emiru Birthday Celebration 2025	Apr. 22nd	Ebisu Garden Hall, Tokyo

== Discography ==
=== Studio albums ===
Title	Album details
Cutie Land	Scheduled: 2 December 2026; Label: Kawaii Lab.; Formats: Blu-ray, CD, DVD, digital download, streaming

=== Singles ===
List of singles, with selected chart positions, showing year released, certifications and album name
Title	Year	Peak chart positions			Certifications	Album
Title	Year	JPN	JPN Cmb.	JPN Hot	Certifications	Album
"Kawaii Dake ja Dame Desu ka?" (かわいいだけじゃだめですか?)	2024	3	3	2	RIAJ: Gold (phy.); 2× Platinum (st.)	Cutie Land
"Chikyū Make Up Keikaku" (ちきゅーめいくあっぷ計画)	2025	2	2	—	RIAJ: Gold (phy.)	Non-album singles
"Kyū ni Stop Dekimasen!" (キューにストップできません!)	2025	2	2	3	RIAJ: Gold (phy.)	Non-album singles
"Nice da ne" (ナイスだね)	2026	1	1	— (Note: "Nice da ne" did not enter the Billboard Japan Hot 100 but peaked at number 70 on the Download Songs chart.)	RIAJ: 2× Platinum (phy.)	Non-album singles
"Cutie Sphere" (キュートなキューたい)	2026	1	1	1	RIAJ: 2× Platinum (phy.)	Cutie Land
"—" denotes releases that did not chart.

=== Promotional singles ===
List of promotional singles, with selected chart positions, showing year released, and album name
Title	Year	Peak chart positions		Album
Title	Year	JPN Hot	KOR DL	Album
"Hello Hello Future" (ハロハロミライ)	2024	—	—	Cutie Land
"Happy World!" (ハッピー世界！)	2025	—	—	Non-album singles
"Love Train" (ラブトレ)	2025	100	—	Non-album singles
"Haru Flake" (ハルフレーク)	2025	—	—	Non-album singles
"The Project of the Earth-Makeup" (ちきゅーめいくあっぷ計画)	2025	—	—	Non-album singles
"A Little Spoonful" (チョットヒトサジ)	2025	—	—	Non-album singles
"More Berry Summer" (モアベリサマー)	2025	—	—	Non-album singles
"Chosen Path" (多元幸福論)	2025	—	—	Non-album singles
"Shooting Star"	2025	—	—	Cutie Land
"Kawaii Sagashite Kuremasuka?" (かわいいさがしてくれますか?)	2025	67	—	Cutie Land
"Pri Kyu Kyu" (ぷりきゅきゅ) (Note: "Pri Kyu Kyu (Korean ver.)" was released on June 6, 2026, as a digital single.)	2026	—	—	Cutie Land
"Dreaming Prima Donna" (ゆめみるプリマドンナ)	2026	— (Note: "Dreaming Prima Donna" did not enter the Billboard Japan Hot 100 but peaked at number 95 on the Download Songs chart.)	—	Non-album single
"Discommutant!" (でぃすこみゅーたんと！)	2026	— (Note: "Discommutant!" did not enter the Billboard Japan Hot 100 but peaked at number 95 on the Download Songs chart.)	—	Cutie Land
"Kawaii Dake ja Dame Desu ka? (Korean ver.)"	2026	—	60	Non-album singles
"I Amai Me Mind"	2026	—	—	Non-album singles
"Crush on You"	2026	—	—	Non-album singles
"Homemaku-Rhythm" (ホメマクリズム)	2026	—	—	Non-album singles
"Error404♡"	2026	— (Note: "Error404♡" did not enter the Billboard Japan Hot 100 but peaked at number 78 on the Download Songs chart.)	—	Non-album singles
"Song of Cutie Street (Korean ver.)"	2026	—	—	Non-album singles
"Top of the Top"	2026	—	—	Non-album singles
"Time of a Treat" (ご褒美しよっ！)	2026	—	—	Cutie Land
"—" denotes releases that did not chart.

=== Other charted songs ===
List of other charted songs, with selected chart positions, showing year released and album name
Title	Year	Peaks	Album
Title	Year	JPN Hot	Album
"Devoted Cinderella!" (ひたむきシンデレラ!)	2024	36	Cutie Land
