= Fruits Zipper =

Japanese idol girl group

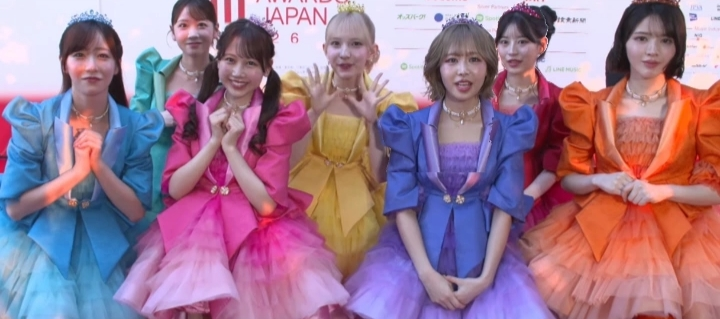
- Fruits Zipper at the 2026 Music Awards Japan

Background information
- Origin: Japan
- Genre: J-pop
- Years active: 2022–present
- Label: Kawaii Lab.
- Members: Amane Tsukiashi; Karen Matsumoto; Mana Manaka; Yui Sakurai; Noel Hayase; Luna Nakagawa; Suzuka Chinzei
- Website: fruitszipper.asobisystem.com

Fruits Zipper (stylized in all caps) is a Japanese girl group that formed in 2022. They debuted with the digital single "Kimi no Akarui Mirai o Oikakete" in April 2022 and released their first album New Kawaii in April 2024.

== History ==
=== 2022–present: Debut and TikTok success ===
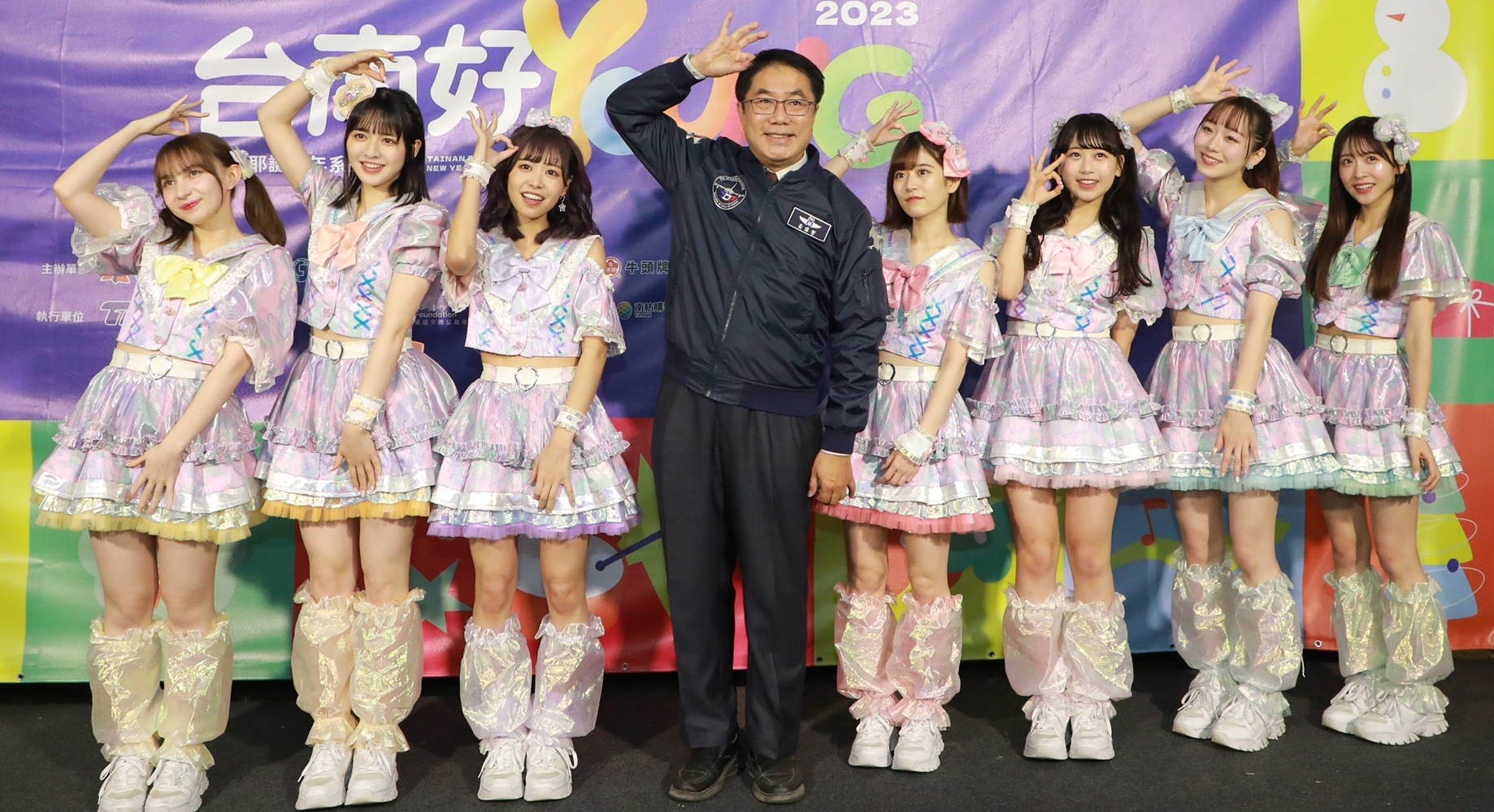
Fruits Zipper in Tainan, Taiwan in 2022

The formation of Fruits Zipper was officially announced on February 14, 2022, and the group's line-up was revealed on February 22. They released their debut digital single, "Kimi no Akarui Mirai o Oikakete", on April 10. Their second digital single, "Watashi no Ichiban Kawaii Tokoro", was released on April 29, and later went viral on TikTok. On May 20, their third digital single, "Kanpeki Shugi de☆", was released. Their fourth digital single, "Radio Galaxy", which was produced by Yuc'e was released on July 29. From August to September, Fruits Zipper released four digital singles: "Skyfeelan", "Fre-Fru Summer!", "We are Frontier", and "Re→Try & Fly". On September 12, they held their first solo performance at Liquid Room in Tokyo. On November 11, they released their ninth digital single "Sekai wa Kimi kara Hajimaru" – the song was used as the theme song for CBC TV drama Link!. On December 31, Fruits Zipper performed overseas for the first time in Taiwan.

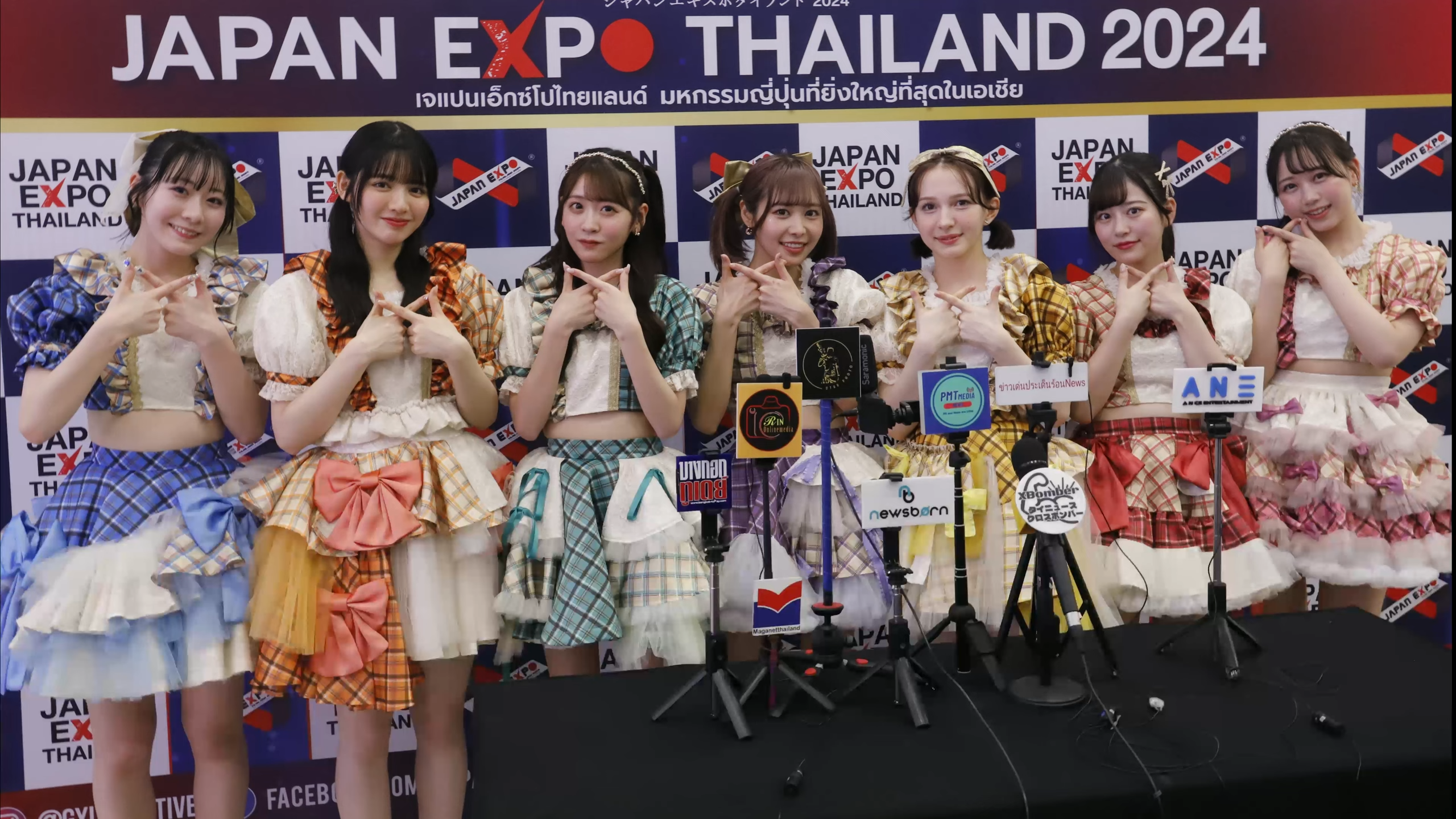
Fruits Zipper at the Japan Expo in Thailand 2024

Their tenth digital single, "Hapi Choco", was released on February 1, 2023. They embarked on their first tour in February. On April 5, they held their first overseas concert in Taiwan. On May 4, their eleventh digital single, "Chō Medetai Song ～Konna ni Shiawase de Ii no ka na?～", was released. On August 4, they released their twelfth digital single, "Pure in the World". They embarked on their first national tour in September. Their viral digital single "Watashi no Ichiban Kawaii tokoro" was re-released on September 13 as Fruits Zipper's first maxi-single. On October 4, they released their thirteenth digital single, "Co-Kosei", followed by their fourteenth digital single, "Kimikoi", on October 29. In December, they won the New Artist Award at the 65th Japan Record Awards.

On April 10, 2024, they released their first album New Kawaii. On May 18 and 19, they held their second anniversary concerts at the Nippon Budokan. They released their second maxi-single, "New Kawaii / Fruits Basket", on September 18. In December, they won the Excellent Work Award for their song "New Kawaii" at the 66th Japan Record Awards.

They released their fifteenth digital single, "Kagami", on January 17, 2025.

== Members ==
- Amane Tsukiashi (月足 天音)
- Karen Matsumoto (松本 かれん)
- Mana Manaka (真中 まな)
- Yui Sakurai (櫻井 優衣)
- Noel Hayase (早瀬 ノエル)
- Luna Nakagawa (仲川 瑠夏)
- Suzuka Chinzei (鎮西 寿々歌)

== Discography ==
=== Studio albums ===
Title	Album details	Peak chart positions	
Title	Album details	Oricon	Billboard
New Kawaii	Released: April 10, 2024; Label: Asobi Music; Formats: CD, digital download	2	2

=== Singles ===
Title	Year	Peak chart positions		Certifications	Album
Title	Year	JPN	JPN Hot	Certifications	Album
"Kimi no Akarui Mirai o Oikakete" (君の明るい未来を追いかけて)	2022	—	—		New Kawaii
"Watashi no Ichiban Kawaii Tokoro" (わたしの一番かわいいところ) (Note: "Watashi no Ichiban Kawaī tokoro" was re-released as a maxi-single on September 13, 2023.)	2022	4	13	RIAJ: 2× Platinum (st.)	New Kawaii
"Kanpeki Shugi de" (完璧主義で☆)	2022	—	—		Non-album single
"Radio Galaxy"	2022	—	—		New Kawaii
"Skyfeelan"	2022	—	—		Non-album single
"Fre-Fru Summer!" (ふれふるサマー！)	2022	—	—		New Kawaii
"We are Frontier"	2022	—	—		Non-album singles
"Re→Try & Fly"	2022	—	—		Non-album singles
"Sekai wa Kimi kara Hajimaru" (世界はキミからはじまる)	2022	—	—		Non-album singles
"Hapi Choco" (ハピチョコ)	2023	—	—		New Kawaii
"Chō Medetai Song (Konna ni Shiawase de Ii no kana?)" (超めでたいソング ～こんなに幸せでいいのかな？)	2023	—	—		New Kawaii
"Pure in the World" (ぴゅあいんざわーるど)	2023	—	—		New Kawaii
"Co-Kosei" (Co-個性)	2023	—	—		New Kawaii
"Kimikoi" (キミコイ)	2023	—	—		New Kawaii
"New Kawaii"	2024	3	10	RIAJ: Platinum (st.)	Non-album singles
"Fruits Basket" (フルーツバスケット)	2024	3	39		Non-album singles
"Kagami" (かがみ)	2025	—	48		Non-album singles
"Suki, Onegai" (好き、お願い)	2025	—	—		Non-album singles
"Sugarless Girl"	2025	—	—		Non-album singles
"Kawaitte Magic" (KawaiiってMagic)	2025	1	1	RIAJ: Platinum (phy.)	Non-album singles
"San" (さん)	2025	—	—		Non-album singles
"Hachamecha Wacha Life!" (はちゃめちゃわちゃライフ!)	2025	1	2	RIAJ: Platinum (phy.)	Non-album singles
"Jam"	2025	1	—	RIAJ: Platinum (phy.)	Non-album singles
"Power of Love" (ぱわーオブらぶ)	2026	1	4	RIAJ: Million (phy.)	Non-album singles
"Sensation" (センセーション)	2026	1	—	RIAJ: Million (phy.)	Non-album singles
"—" denotes releases that did not chart or were not released in that region.

== Awards and nominations ==
Award ceremony	Year	Category	Nominee(s)/work(s)	Result	Ref.
Japan Record Awards	2023	New Artist Award	Fruits Zipper	Won	
Japan Record Awards	2024	Excellent Work Award (Songs of the Year)	"New Kawaii"	Won	
MTV Video Music Awards Japan	2025	Best Breakthrough Video	"New Kawaii"	Won	
