= Knock On Vol.1 Tour =

2024–2025 concert tour by BoyNextDoor

- Tour by BoyNextDoor
- Promotional poster
- Location: Asia
- Associated album: Who!; Why..; How?; 19.99; No Genre
- Start date: December 14, 2024
- End date: July 27, 2025
- Legs: 2
- No. of shows: 23

BoyNextDoor concert chronology
- Knock On Vol.1 Tour (2024–2025); Knock On Vol.2 Tour (2026–2027)

The Knock On Vol.1 Tour was the debut concert tour by South Korean boy band BoyNextDoor, in support of their first four releases—Who!, Why.., How?, and 19.99. The tour began in Incheon, South Korea, on December 14, 2024, and ended on July 27, 2025, with its final tour date in Seoul, South Korea.

== Background and development ==
As this is our first concert, our goal was to show the team's authenticity as much as possible. We wanted to bring out fans' emotions when they first heard our music

— BoyNextDoor, describing their goals for the concert

On September 23, 2024, KOZ Entertainment announced BoyNextDoor's debut concert tour, the Knock On Vol.1 Tour. In an online poster, the band then announced 18 shows in 13 cities across Asia. Ticket sales for the Knock On Vol.1 Tour were handled by TicketNet in the Philippines and TixCraft in Taiwan.

In an interview published in The Korea Herald, the group explained that the tour's main title "Knock On" is an invitation for their fans to meet them at the "paradise" envisioned in the concert and an affirmation that the band would travel the world to reach their fans. In an interview with Teen Vogue, Sungho added that the tour aims to emphasize the group's originality and serve as a recall of their history. The set list consists of songs from their first four releases—Who! (2023), Why.. (2023), How? (2024) and 19.99 (2024)—with minimal changes to their arrangement.

On March 24, the band announced three additional concerts each in South Korea and Japan, including the show's final show at the Olympic Gymnastics Arena in Seoul.

== Concert synopsis ==
The concert begins with BoyNextDoor emerging from beneath the stage to perform "Earth, Wind & Fire" against a backdrop of pyrotechnics. Afterward, the band performs "Dangerous" against the backdrop of pulsating red lights and lasers.

== Promotion ==
Pop-up stores were set up in Tokyo and Osaka to commemorate the tour. In Harujuku, a promotional winter-themed event was held from December 20 to January 13 on Takeshita Street.

=== Spin-off media ===
During BoyNextDoor's opening weekend in Incheon on December 13 to 14, 2024, they announced their first digital single "If I Say, I Love You".

== Live album ==
BoyNextDoor Tour 'Knock On Vol.1' Final (Live)

Live album by BoyNextDoor
- Released: February 4, 2026
- Recorded: July 27, 2025
- Venue: KSPO Dome
- Length: 51:43
- Label: KOZ

BoyNextDoor chronology
The Action (2025)	BoyNextDoor Tour 'Knock On Vol.1' Final (Live) (2026)	Home (2026)

BoyNextDoor Tour 'Knock On Vol.1' Final (Live) is the first live album by BoyNextDoor, released on February 4, 2026, through KOZ Entertainment. The album contains recordings of from the tour's final stop at the KSPO Dome in Seoul, South Korea, on July 27, 2025, which featured band arrangements of the set list.

=== Track listing ===
No.	Title	Length
1.	"Nice Guy"	3:53
2.	"Serenade"	3:18
3.	"123-78"	3:10
4.	"OUR"	2:41
5.	"Life is Cool"	4:15
6.	"But I Like You"	3:09
7.	"One and Only"	2:56
8.	"Step by Step"	2:30
9.	"If I Say, I Love You"	4:16
10.	"I Feel Good"	2:46
11.	"Dangerous"	2:36
12.	"But Sometimes"	2:54
13.	"Crying"	3:46
14.	"Dear. My Darling"	2:18
15.	"Gonna Be a Rock"	3:35
16.	"Earth, Wind & Fire"	3:31
Total length:		51:43

== Set list ==
The set list is from the December 14, 2024, show in Incheon, South Korea. It is not intended to represent all concerts for the tour.

1. "Earth, Wind & Fire"
2. "Dangerous"
3. "But I Like You"
4. "Life is Cool"
5. "OUR"
6. "Call Me"
7. "Dear. My Darling"
8. "It's Beginning to Look a Lot Like Christmas" (cover of Perry Como and Bing Crosby)
9. "Lucky Charm"
10. "Fadeaway"
11. "ABCDLove"
12. "20"
13. "Amnesia"
14. "Crying"
15. "But Sometimes"
16. "Gonna Be a Rock"
17. "One and Only"
18. "Skit"
19. "Nice Guy"

Encore

20. "Serenade"
21. "400 Years"
22. "So Let's Go See the Stars"

== Tour dates ==
List of 2024 shows
Date	City	Country	Venue
December 14, 2024	Incheon	South Korea	Inspire Arena
December 15, 2024	Incheon	South Korea	Inspire Arena

List of 2025 shows
Date	City	Country	Venue
January 30, 2025	Tokyo	Japan	Tachikawa Stage Garden
February 2, 2025	Nagoya	Japan	Niterra Hall
February 8, 2025	Osaka	Japan	Osaka International Convention Center
February 9, 2025	Osaka	Japan	Osaka International Convention Center
February 15, 2025	Sendai	Japan	Sendai Sun Plaza Hall
February 18, 2025	Fukuoka	Japan	Fukuoka Sunplace
February 19, 2025	Fukuoka	Japan	Fukuoka Sunplace
February 22, 2025	Yokohama	Japan	Pacifico Yokohama National Conventional Hall
February 23, 2025	Yokohama	Japan	Pacifico Yokohama National Conventional Hall
February 24, 2025	Yokohama	Japan	Pacifico Yokohama National Conventional Hall
March 15, 2025	Singapore		Arena @ Expo
March 22, 2025	Quezon City (Note: Labeled as Manila in promotional material)	Philippines	Araneta Coliseum
April 3, 2025	New Taipei (Note: Labeled as Taipei in promotional material)	Taiwan	New Taipei City Exhibition Hall
April 6, 2025	Hong Kong	China	AsiaWorld-Expo Hall 10
April 12, 2025	Jakarta	Indonesia	Istora Senayan
June 28, 2025	Tokyo	Japan	Musashino Forest Sport Plaza
June 29, 2025	Tokyo	Japan	Musashino Forest Sport Plaza
June 30, 2025	Tokyo	Japan	Musashino Forest Sport Plaza
July 25, 2025	Seoul	South Korea	KSPO Dome
July 26, 2025	Seoul	South Korea	KSPO Dome
July 27, 2025	Seoul	South Korea	KSPO Dome

=== Cancelled shows ===
List of cancelled concerts
Date	City	Country	Venue	Reason
March 29, 2025	Pak Kret (Note: Labeled as Bangkok in promotional material)	Thailand	Thunder Dome	2025 Myanmar earthquake
