= Home (BoyNextDoor album) =

- Digital cover

Studio album by BoyNextDoor
- Released: June 8, 2026
- Length: 24:51
- Languages: Korean; English
- Label: KOZ
- Producers: Pop Time; Kako; Zico

BoyNextDoor chronology
BoyNextDoor Tour 'Knock On Vol.1' Final (Live) (2026)	Home (2026)

Singles from Home
- 1. "Ddok Ddok Ddok" Released: May 11, 2026; 2. "Viral" Released: June 8, 2026

Singles from Home: Deluxe
- 1. "Animal" Released: September 28, 2026

Home is the first studio album by South Korean boy band BoyNextDoor, released on June 8, 2026, through KOZ Entertainment. The group produced the album with Pop Time, Kako, and Zico, and envisioned its songs as reflections of themselves.

Home was promoted with the band's second headlining concert tour, Knock On Vol.2. Three singles were released from the album: the surprise-released lead single "Ddok Ddok Ddok", the title track "Viral", and "Animal", taken from the deluxe version of the album.

== Background ==
On October 20, 2025, BoyNextDoor released their fifth extended play (EP) The Action to commercial success, topping the Circle Album Chart and debuting at number 40 at the Billboard 200 chart. Continuing the group's collaboration with Pop Time and label head Zico, the EP revolved around themes of self-improvement and featured a fictitious film production crew of the same name portrayed by the members. Following the conclusion of their debut Knock On Vol.1 Tour (2024–25), the band released their first live album in February 2026.

In an interview following a photoshoot for fashion magazine Arena Homme + that March, leader Myung Jaehyun confirmed their plans of releasing a full-length album later in the year, hoping that the project would be a "place of comfort" for its listeners. The following month, media outlets including The Korea Herald reported that the band was preparing to release their first studio album in June, spearheaded by a pre-release single in May.

== Composition ==
=== Music and lyrics ===
"Since Home is about emotions and the moments that shaped us, not just a physical place, I think that perspective naturally came through and helped make the album feel more honest and cohesive."

— Leehan describing Home in a media interview

BoyNextDoor envisioned Home as a "very honest reflection" of themselves, seeking to show the group at their "most authentic and vulnerable". Woonhak described their self-presentation for the project as a departure from the "innocence" they had expressed in their previous works, instead choosing to emphasize "anxious feelings of living through youth and emotions" not previously explored in their work.

As with earlier releases in the group's discography, the production of Home was handled by Pop Time, Kako, and label head Zico, with active participation from the group, which received a collective writing credit for the first time in their career with the tracks "06070", "Forever You", "I Wonder", and "I Wonder, Always". According to Sungho, the album incorporates "unique K-pop musical colors" prevalent in their upbringing in their own style.

=== Songs ===
The opening track "06070" recalls the members' lives leading up to their debut as a boy band, beginning with Myung's experiences working at a number of part-time jobs at age 20.

Sungho described "Ddok Ddok Ddok" as a song about "showing up unannounced". A hip-hop track, the song references the band's earlier single "One and Only" (2023), which opened by "knocking on doors", through a heavy use of onomatopoeia imitating knocking sounds.

== Release and promotion ==
=== Marketing ===
On May 8, 2026, KOZ Entertainment launched a new website to announce Home as BoyNextDoor's first studio album. The website features an interactive house that features details about the album's release, including its release date. On May 11, the group surprise-released the music video for "Ddok Ddok Ddok" before releasing the track as the lead single later that day. The full track list for the album was released on May 20 with "Viral" denoted as the album's title track. A "track spoiler" titled "Homecoming" featuring series of snippets from the album's tracks was released on May 31.

On September 28, KOZ will release a deluxe edition of the album featuring four five additional tracks, including the third single from the album "Animal" and Korean versions of previous Japanese-language singles "Count to Love" and "Boom Boom Boom".

=== Touring ===
On May 13, KOZ announced the Knock On Vol.2 Tour in support of the album as the band's second headlining concert tour. The tour will begin with its domestic leg starting in Seoul, South Korea, in July followed by a Japan leg spanning from August to September. A North American leg will follow from October to November before concluding with its Asian leg from December to January 2027.

== Track listing ==
Standard edition
No.	Title	Lyrics	Music	Producer(s)	Length
1.	"06070"	Kako; BoyNextDoor; Zico	Pop Time; Kako; Myung Jaehyun; Woonhak; Zico; Mortal; Theevoni; Daily	Pop Time; Kako	3:23
2.	"Viral"	Kako; Zico; Myung Jaehyun; Woonhak; Hwang Se-hyeon	Pop Time; Kako; Zico; Woonhak; Daily; Haju; Shannon Bae; Pop Time; Kako; Zico; Woonhak; Daily; Haju; Shannon Bae	Pop Time; Kako	3:19
3.	"Ddok Ddok Ddok" (똑똑똑; lit. 'Knock Knock Knock')	Penomeco; Damian; Zico; Myung Jae-hyun; Taesan; Woonhak	Zico; Pop Time; Lil Moshpit; 25L (Area Lab); Myung; Taesan; Woonhak; Daily; Kurt	Zico; Pop Time	2:35
4.	"Adios!"	Kako; Myung; Taesan; Woonhak	Pop Time; Kako; Myung; Woonhak; Daily; Likey; Haju	Pop Time; Kako	2:47
5.	"Upside Down"	Kako; Riwoo; Taesan; Woonhak; Haju	Pop Time; Kako; Riwoo; Myung; Taesan; Leehan; Woonhak; Daily; Haju	Pop Time; Kako	2:38
6.	"Dive"	Kako; Myung; Taesan; Woonhak; Likey; Sapoh	Pop Time; Kako; Zico; Woonhak; Daily; Haju; Shannon Bae	Pop Time; Kako	3:07
7.	"Forever You" (기억해줘요; lit. 'Please Remember')	Kako; BoyNextDoor	Pop Time; Kako; Daily; Myung; Taesan; Leehan; Woonhak	Pop Time; Kako	3:44
8.	"I Wonder"	Kako; BoyNextDoor	Pop Time; Kako; Myung; Taesan; Woonhak; Daily; Kurt; Hwang Se-hyeon	Pop Time; Kako	3:18
Total length:					24:41

CD-exclusive track
No.	Title	Writer(s)	Producer(s)	Length
9.	"I Wonder, Always"	BoyNextDoor; Pop Time; Kako; Daily; Kurt	Pop Time; Kako
Total length:				30:42

Deluxe edition
No.	Title	Lyrics	Producer(s)	Length
1.	"Animal"	Pop Time; Kako; Zico; Myung; Taesan; Woonhak; Daily; Haju; Zeno Vibe	Pop Time; Kako
2.	"Cliche"	Pop Time; Kako; Myung; Taesan; Woonhak; Daily; Likey; Sapoh	Pop Time; Kako
11.	"Count to Love" (Korean version)	Pop Time; Kako; Roho; Taesan; Daily; Kanata Okajima	Pop Time
12.	"400 Years"	BoyNextDoor; Pop Time; Kako; Daily; Likey	Pop Time; Kako
13.	"Boom Boom Boom"	Rick Bridges; Steven Deevan; Dorlis	Artificial

=== Notes ===
- Deluxe places the standard tracks between "Cliche" and "Count to Love"

== Charts ==
=== Weekly charts ===
Weekly chart performance
Chart (2026)	Peak position
Austrian Albums (Ö3 Austria)	61
Belgian Albums (Ultratop Flanders)	70
Belgian Albums (Ultratop Wallonia)	41
Croatian International Albums (HDU)	11
French Albums (SNEP)	79
Greek Albums (IFPI)	12
Hungarian Physical Albums (MAHASZ)	18
Japanese Albums (Oricon)	1
Japanese Combined Albums (Oricon)	1
Japanese Hot Albums (Billboard Japan)	1
Portuguese Albums (AFP)	55
South Korean Albums (Circle)	1
Swedish Physical Albums (Sverigetopplistan)	18
US Billboard 200	16
US World Albums (Billboard)	1

Home: Deluxe
Chart (2026)	Peak position
French Physical Albums (SNEP)	41
Greek Albums (IFPI)	40
Japanese Albums (Oricon)	4
Japanese Combined Albums (Oricon)	4
South Korean Albums (Circle)	2

=== Monthly charts ===
Monthly chart performance
Chart (2026)	Position
Japanese Albums (Oricon)	2
South Korean Albums (Circle)	3

Home: Deluxe
Chart (2026)	Position
Japanese Albums (Oricon)	7
South Korean Albums (Circle)	4

== Certifications ==
Certifications
Region	Certification	Certified units/sales
Japan (RIAJ)	Gold	100,000^{^}
South Korea (KMCA)	Million	1,000,000^{^}
^{^} Shipments figures based on certification alone.

== Release history ==
Release dates and formats
Region	Date	Format	Editions	Label
Various	June 8, 2026	Digital download; streaming	Standard	KOZ
South Korea	June 8, 2026	CD	Standard	KOZ
Japan	June 10, 2026	CD	Standard	Hybe Japan
Various	June 8, 2026	CD; digital download; streaming	Deluxe	KOZ
