= If I Say, I Love You =

- Korean release digital cover

Single by BoyNextDoor

from the EP No Genre
- Language: Korean
- Released: January 6, 2025
- Genre: Dance-pop
- Length: 2:41
- Label: KOZ
- Composers: Pop Time; Kako; Ryo; Zico; Taesan; Woonhak
- Lyricists: Kako; Woonhak

BoyNextDoor singles chronology
"Nice Guy" (2024)	"If I Say, I Love You" (2025)	"I Feel Good" (2025)

Music video
- "If I Say, I Love You" on YouTube

Alternative cover
- Japanese release digital cover

"If I Say, I Love You" (Korean: 오늘만 I Love You; lit. 'Just for today I love you') is a song recorded by South Korean boy band BoyNextDoor. KOZ Entertainment released the song as the group's first digital single on January 6, 2025. Members Taesan and Woonhak wrote the song with co-writer Kako. Described as a dance-pop song, "If I Say, I Love You" revolves around the emotion of "patheticness", narrating the aftermath of a breakup in a self-deprecating fashion. The single was accompanied with a winter-themed music video with elements of a slice of life plot.

Commercially, "If I Say I Love You" became BoyNextDoor's first major hit in South Korea, their first ever song to enter the top ten of the Circle Digital Chart, and was the best performing song by a male group in 2025 on the chart. It received awards during its promotion in the music programs of South Korea. A Japanese version of the song was released as a digital single on January 31, 2025, through Universal Music Japan.

== Background ==
BoyNextDoor released their third extended play (EP) 19.99 in September 2024, which focused on self-expression and introspection, drawing from the group's experiences in their transition to adulthood. The EP was fronted by the singles "Dangerous" and "Nice Guy", which presented themes of rebellion and self-confidence respectively. In support of 19.99 and its preceding releases, BoyNextDoor embarked on their debut world tour, Knock On Vol.1 Tour. During their first show at the Inspire Arena in Incheon, the group announced their first digital single "If I Say, I Love You".

== Composition ==
Although the theme is about breakups, since it has a cheerful aspect, we focused on vocally expressing a middle ground — not too excited but not too depressed either.

— Riwoo, discussing the song's development

"If I Say, I Love You" is an upbeat dance-pop song with a runtime of two minutes and 41 seconds. Taesan and Woonhak wrote the song's lyrics, with Kako and Woonhak credited as co-writers. Frequent collaborators Pop Time, Kako, Ryo, and Zico composed the track with Pop Time, Daily, and Likely assisting with the song's arrangement.

Aiming for a "fresh new narrative" after the "confident and bold" themes of 19.99, the members explored the emotion of "patheticness" in the track. The lyrics narrate the aftermath of a breakup in a self-deprecating light from the perspective of the "younger generation". Member Riwoo noted that given the lyrical themes, the upbeat production commanded a vocal performance that balanced excitement and depression.

== Critical reception ==
Professional ratings
Review scores
Source	Rating
IZM	1.5/5 stars

Writing a 1.5-star review for the online magazine IZM, So Seung-geun opined that the track shares similarities with Choi Ye-na's 2024 single "Nemonemo". So added that KOZ's characteristic production styles and the track's "contrived melodies and unreasonable progressions" erode the members' vocals, describing the end product as a "slump".

Year-end lists for "If I Say I Love You"
Critic/Publication	List	Rank	Ref.
NME	The 25 Best K-pop Songs of 2025	22	

== Music video ==
The music video for "If I Say, I Love You" follows a narrative structure, depicting the six members as different personalities of the same boy dealing with the aftermath of a rejection. With a length of four minutes and eight seconds, the video follows a slice of life plot set in the backdrop of winter.

== Accolades ==
"If I Say, I Love You" won its first music program win in the January 16, 2025, episode of M Countdown and its second on the January 19, 2025, episode of Inkigayo.

Program	Date	Ref.
M Countdown	January 16, 2025	.
Inkigayo	January 19, 2025	

== Release and promotion ==
"If I Say, I Love You", alongside its music video, was released on January 6, 2025. The single was promoted with a winter concept, with accompanying promotional images released on December 27 and 28. The band collaborated with the department store franchise Shinsegae to screen the release of the music video on the landmark digital billboard of its flagship store in the Myeong-dong neighborhood in Seoul. A Japanese version of the song followed as a digital single on January 31.

The inclusion of the Japanese phrase for "I love you" (愛してる, aishiteru) in the chorus prompted KOZ to change the line in English to "I want you" in some promotions for terrestrial television. A broadcasting official interviewed by The Dong-a Ilbo attributed the change to the ambiguity of regulations on the use of the Japanese language in Korean songs following the January 2004 lifting of the Japanese pop culture instituted by former President Kim Dae-jung.

== Charts ==
=== Weekly charts ===
Weekly chart performance for "If I Say, I Love You"
Chart (2025)	Peak position
Global 200 (Billboard)	188
Japan (Japan Hot 100)	25
Japan Combined Singles (Oricon)	17
South Korea (Circle)	6
Taiwan (Billboard)	14

=== Monthly charts ===
Monthly chart performance for "If I Say, I Love You"
Chart (2025)	Peak position
South Korea (Circle)	7

=== Year-end charts ===
Year-end chart performance for "If I Say, I Love You"
Chart (2025)	Position
South Korea (Circle)	10

== Release history ==
Release history for "If I Say, I Love You"
Region	Date	Format	Version	Label
Various	January 6, 2025	Digital download; streaming	Original	KOZ
Various	January 31, 2025	Digital download; streaming	Japanese	KOZ; Universal Japan
