= Nice Guy =

A nice guy is an informal term describing a man who is agreeable, gentle, compassionate, sensitive, and vulnerable.

Nice Guy may also refer to:

- Nice Guy (album), a 2020 album by Eric Paslay
- "Nice Guy" (Eminem and Jessie Reyez song), 2018
- Nice Guy (Cardi B song), 2025
- "Nice Guy", a 2024 song by BoyNextDoor from the EP 19.99
- "Nice Guy", a 2012 song by Lukas Graham from the album Lukas Graham
- Nice Guy, an alternative title for the South Korean TV series The Innocent Man

== See also ==
- Nice Guys (disambiguation)
- Mr. Nice Guy (disambiguation)
