= Count to Love =

- Maxi single digital cover

Single by BoyNextDoor
- Language: Japanese
- B-side: "I Feel Good" (Japanese version); "Nice Guy" (Japanese version); "Dangerous" (Japanese version)
- Released: August 18, 2025
- Genre: J-pop
- Length: 2:38
- Label: KOZ
- Composers: Pop Time; Roho; Daily; Kako; Taesan
- Lyricists: Kanata Okajima; Roho; Taesan
- Producers: Pop Time; Kako

BoyNextDoor singles chronology
"I Feel Good" (2025)	"Count to Love" (2025)	"Hollywood Action" (2025)

Music video
- Count to Love on YouTube

"Count to Love" is a song recorded by South Korean boy band BoyNextDoor. It was released on August 18, 2025, through KOZ Entertainment as the lead track of their second Japanese maxi single "Boylife".

== Background and release ==
BoyNextDoor began their first concert tour Knock On Vol.1 Tour in December 2024. During their June 30, 2025 concert in Tokyo, they announced their second Japanese single "Boylife". Their label, KOZ Entertainment, confirmed the news the following day, in concurrence with the launch of pre-orders for the physical single.

The music video for "Count to Love" was released on August 18, featuring Japanese actor Rihito Itagaki in his first appearance in a foreign artist's music video. The maxi single "Boylife" was then released as a whole on streaming platforms and CDs on August 20.

== Commercial performance ==
"Boylift" debuted at the top of the Oricon Albums Chart in the chart issue dated August 18–24, 2025. 340,000 copies of the single were sold in Japan in the first week, almost double the sales count within the same timeframe as their first Japanese single "And,". "Count to Love" also debuted at the top of the Billboard Japan Hot 100, making it the first song by the group to top the chart.

== Track listing ==
Track listing for "Boylife"
No.	Title	Lyrics	Music	Arrangement	Length
1.	"Count to Love"	Kanata Okajima; Roho; Taesan	Pop Time; Roho; Daily; Kako; Taesan	Pop Time; Roho; Daily	2:38
2.	"I Feel Good" (Japanese version)	Zico; Kako; Taesan; Woonhak	Pop Time; Zico; Kako; Jaehyun; Taesan; Woonhak; Nathan; HoHo	Pop Time; Nathan; HoHo	2:35
3.	"Nice Guy" (Japanese version)	Kako; Jaehyun; Taesan; Woonhak; Zico	Pop Time; Kako; Taesan; Woonhak; Daily; Likey	Pop Time; Daily; Likey	2:44
4.	"Dangerous" (Japanese version)	Jaehyun; Taesan; Woonhak; Kako; Pop Time	Jaehyun; Taesan; Woonhak	Pop Time	2:24
Total length:					10:22

== Charts ==
=== Weekly charts ===
Weekly chart performance for "Boylife"
Chart (2025)	Peak position
Japan (Oricon)	1
Japan Combined Singles (Oricon)	1
Japan Top Singles Sales (Billboard Japan)	1
South Korea Retail (Circle)	9

Weekly chart performance for "Count to Love"
Chart (2025)	Peak position
Japan (Japan Hot 100)	1
Japan Streaming (Oricon)	47
South Korea (Circle)	127

=== Monthly charts ===
Monthly chart performance for "Boylife"
Chart (2025)	Position
Japan (Oricon)	2
South Korea Retail (Circle)	15

=== Year-end charts ===
Year-end chart performance for "Boylife"
Chart (2025)	Position
Japan Top Singles Sales (Billboard Japan)	21
Japan (Oricon)	23

== Certifications ==
Certifications for "Boylife"
Region	Certification	Certified units/sales
Japan (RIAJ)	2× Platinum	500,000^{^}
^{^} Shipments figures based on certification alone.

== Release history ==
Release history for "Count to Love"
Region	Date	Format	Label
Various	August 18, 2025	Digital download; streaming	KOZ
South Korea	August 20, 2025	CD	KOZ
Japan	August 20, 2025	CD	KOZ; Universal Japan
