= No More Mr. Nice Guy =

No More Mr. Nice Guy may refer to:

== Music ==
- "No More Mr. Nice Guys", a 1971 song by Sparks from Halfnelson
- "No More Mr. Nice Guy" (song), a 1973 song by Alice Cooper, later covered by Megadeth
- No More Mr. Nice Guy (Gang Starr album), 1989
- No More Mr. Nice Guy (Steve Wariner album), 1996
- In a Metal Mood: No More Mr. Nice Guy, a 1997 album by Pat Boone
- "No More Mr. Nice Guy", a 1994 song from The Swan Princess: Music From The Motion Picture

== Film and television ==
- No More Mr. Nice Guy (film), a 1993 German film
- "No More Mr. Nice Guy", an episode of Welcome Back, Kotter
- "No More Mr. Nice Guy", an episode of Dukes of Hazzard
- "No More Mr. Nice Guy" (Freddy's Nightmares), an episode of Freddy's Nightmares
- "No More Mr. Nice Guy" (House), an episode of House

== Other uses ==
- No More Mr. Nice Guy, a 1998 novel by Howard Jacobson
- No More Mr. Nice Guy, a 2000 self-help book by Robert A. Glover

== See also ==
- Mr. Nice Guy (disambiguation)
