= BoyNextDoor =

South Korean boy band

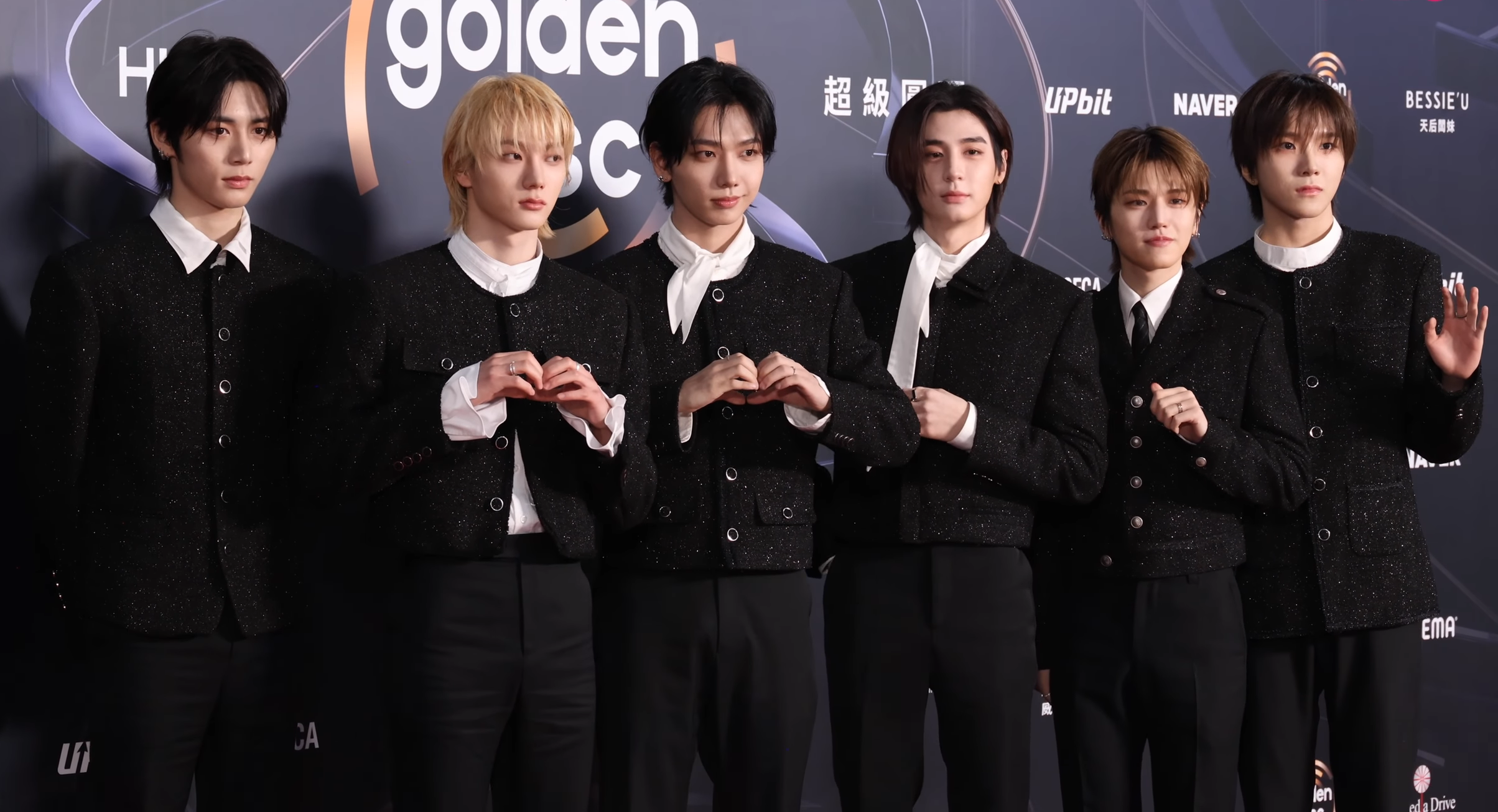
- BoyNextDoor in 2026; L–R: Taesan, Sungho, Myung Jaehyun, Leehan, Riwoo, Woonhak

Background information
- Origin: Seoul, South Korea
- Genre: K-pop
- Years active: 2023–present
- Labels: KOZ; Universal Japan
- Members: Sungho; Riwoo; Myung Jaehyun; Taesan; Leehan; Woonhak
- Website: boynextdoor-official.com

BoyNextDoor (Korean: 보이넥스트도어; stylized in all caps) is a South Korean boy band formed by KOZ Entertainment in 2023. The group consists of six members: Sungho, Riwoo, Myung Jaehyun, Taesan, Leehan, and Woonhak. Characterized by its eponymous "boy next door" image, the group defines their work as easy listening with themes drawn from daily life.

BoyNextDoor debuted in May 2023, with the single album Who!, which formed the first installment in the "First Love" trilogy that defined the group's first releases. The extended play (EP) Why.. followed the same year and marked the group's first appearance on the Billboard 200 chart. The group's second EP, How? (2024), became the group's first release to top the Circle Album Chart.

The group debuted in Japan later that year through Universal Music Japan with the maxi single "And,", which was followed by their third EP 19.99 (2024). They embarked on their debut Knock On Vol.1 Tour in December 2024 and released their first digital single "If I Say, I Love You" in January 2025. The group's fourth EP, No Genre, was released in May to commercial success, followed by The Action in October.

In June 2026, the group released their first studio album, Home, followed by their second Japanese digital single "Boom Boom Boom" in August.

== Name ==
The logo of BoyNextDoor

The group name is derived from the boy next door trope, which KOZ Entertainment related to the group's "casual, friendly" approach to the public.

== History ==
=== 2019–2023: Formation and introduction ===
On January 11, 2019, rapper-producer Zico of Block B founded the label KOZ Entertainment after departing with Seven Seasons. Hybe Corporation would later acquire the label as a subsidiary in 2020 and included KOZ in its joint auditions in March 2022.

Zico announced his plans to debut a boy band under the agency in February 2023. Media outlets reported that the group will debut in May of that year. The group, named BoyNextDoor, was formally introduced on April 16, through the release of an animated video on YouTube. The members were introduced on May 14, through a series of GIFs depicting each member released across the band's social media platforms.

=== 2023–2024: Debut and first love trilogy ===
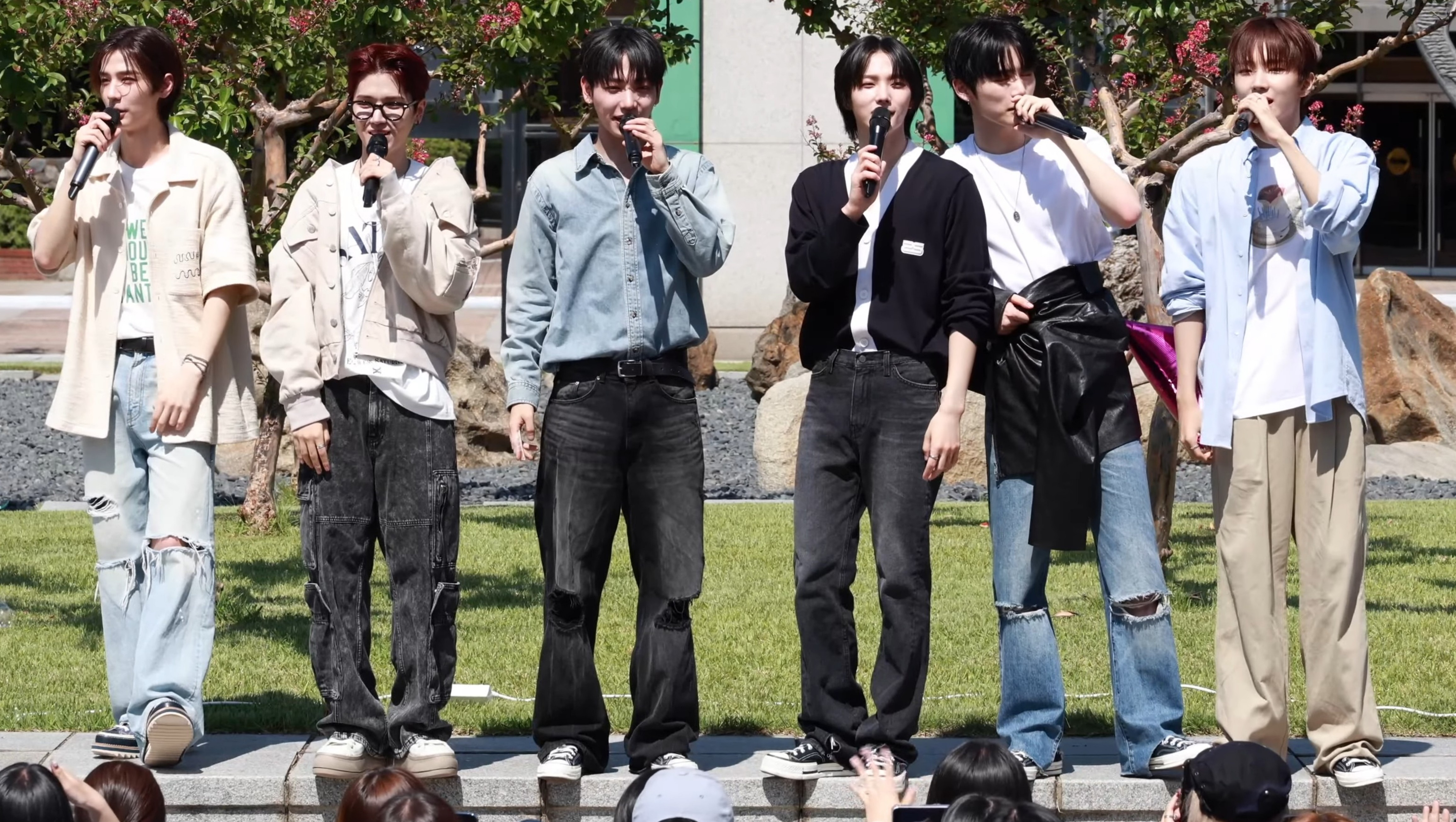
BoyNextDoor during promotions for Who! in September 2023

On May 8, 2023, KOZ announced that BoyNextDoor would debut with a three-track single album titled Who!, with all three tracks being promoted as singles, which publications deemed uncommon. Promotions for the album began with the release of the single "But I Like You", on May 23, followed by "One and Only" on May 26. The band marked their debut with the official release of the album on May 30, alongside the single "Serenade". The single album sold 110,442 copies in its first week of release.

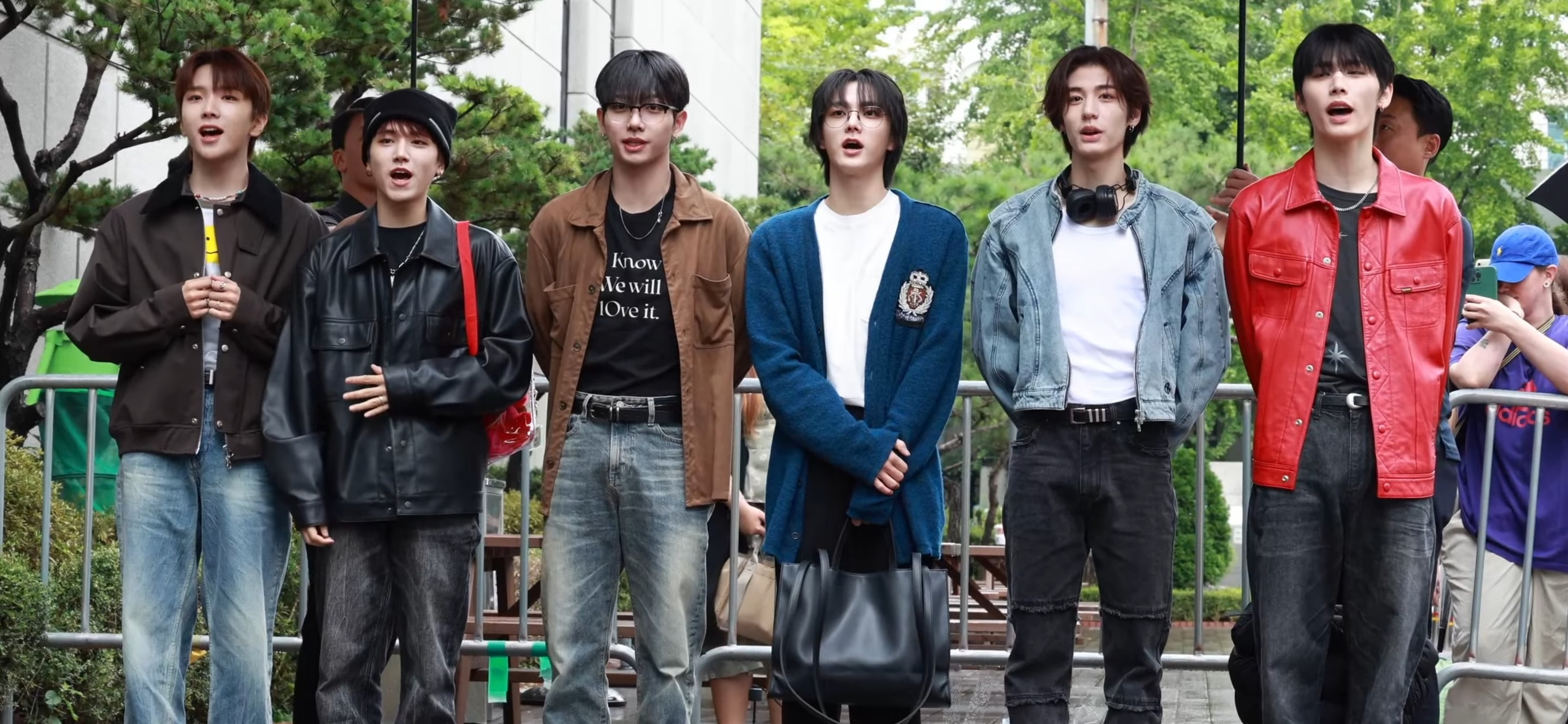
BoyNextDoor in September 2023, during promotions for Why..

On July 13, KOZ announced that the band would return with a new release in September 2023. Their first extended play (EP) titled Why.. was released on September 30, alongside its lead single "But Sometimes". The EP debuted at number 162 in the Billboard 200, marking the group's first appearance on the chart.

On November 1, the group's fandom name, "OneDoor", was announced. The group released the promotional single "Fadeaway" on November 7, as the theme for the Naver webtoon Garbage Time. At the 2023 Melon Music Awards, BoyNextDoor won the special award for Global Rising Artist.

On February 13, 2024, KOZ announced that BoyNextDoor would release new music in April 2024. On March 18, the agency announced the band's second EP, titled How?, through a teaser video titled "How Can This Happen?". How? completes the group's trilogy of releases chronicling the story of a "first love". The EP was released on April 15, alongside the single "Earth, Wind & Fire". How? debuted atop the Circle Album Chart for the issue dated April 20, marking the group's first number one album. On April 23, the group received their first music show win in The Show.

BoyNextDoor held their first fan meeting, titled "OneDoorful Day", at the Olympic Hall in Seoul from June 1 to 2. The group released the promotional single "Lucky Charm" on June 29 as part of the original soundtrack for the JTBC television series Miss Night and Day.

=== 2024: Japanese debut and 19.99 ===
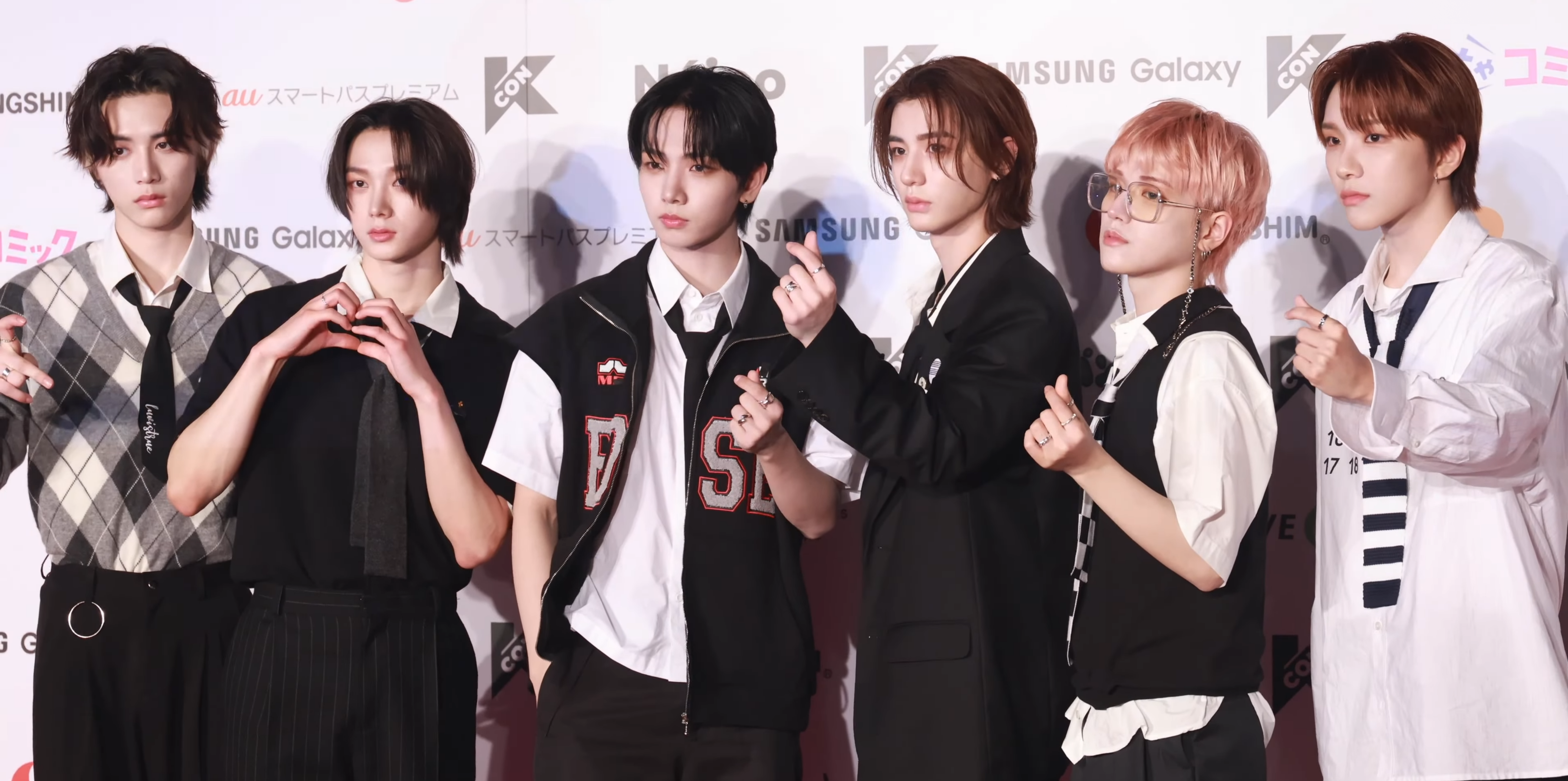
BoyNextDoor at KCON Japan in May 2024

On July 10, 2024, BoyNextDoor debuted in Japan with the maxi single "And,", which features Japanese re-recordings of the group's past singles and the Japanese-language song "Good Day". The single was released to commercial success, entering the Daily Single Ranking for the Oricon Chart dated July 10, marking the band's third number one single in the chart. The band was represented in a K-pop exhibit at the Grammy Museum in Los Angeles, California, United States, alongside 78 other artists under Hybe and its sublabels from August 2 to September 15.

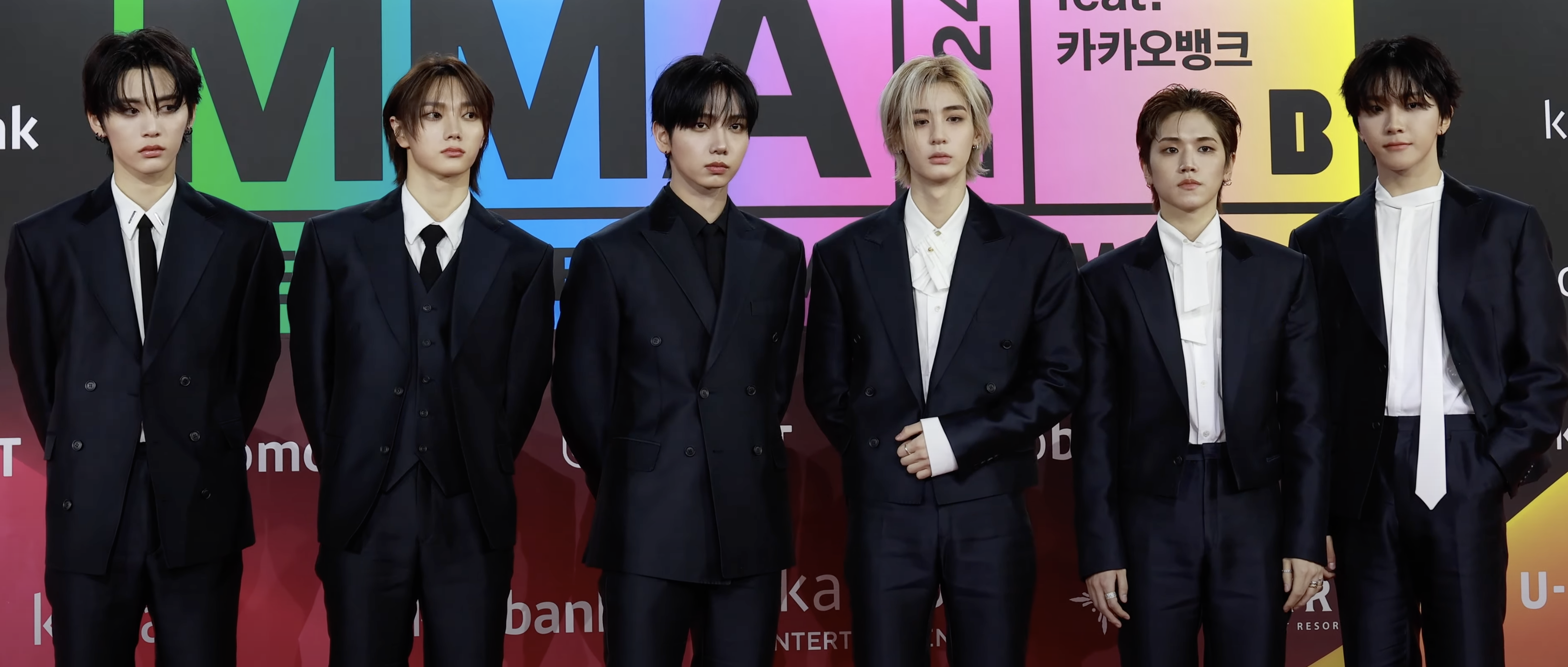
BoyNextDoor at the Melon Music Awards in November 2024

On July 24, The Chosun Ilbo reported that BoyNextDoor was finalizing a new album, set for release in September. On August 12, KOZ revealed the title of their third EP 19.99, through a teaser trailed titled "The Beginning of Countdown: 19.99". The EP was released on September 9 and was supported by two singles—"Dangerous", released on September 2, and "Nice Guy", which was released in conjunction with the EP. On October 25, the EP surpassed one million copies in cumulative sales based on YG Plus statistics. On October 31, BoyNextDoor released a cover of "It's Beginning to Look a Lot Like Christmas" exclusively on Apple Music.

=== 2025: Knock On Vol.1 Tour, No Genre, The Action ===
In support of their first four releases, BoyNextDoor embarked on their first world tour, the Knock On Vol.1 Tour, beginning with two shows at the Inspire Arena in Incheon in December 2024. While on tour, the band released their first digital single "If I Say, I Love You", on January 6, 2025. The group released the promotional single "Never Loved This Way Before", a reworking of the 2021 Cheeze song of the same name, on March 14 as part of the original soundtrack for the Naver webtoon Odd Girl Out. In March 28, the Bangkok show of the tour scheduled for the following day was cancelled in the aftermath of the 2025 Myanmar earthquake, which impacted Thailand.

BoyNextDoor released their fourth EP, No Genre on May 13. The EP was supported by two singles: the lead single "I Feel Good", released alongside the EP, and the preceding digital single "If I Say, I Love You". The EP went on to sell 1.16 million copies in its opening week and debut atop the Circle Album Chart, marking the band's highest first-week sales. On August 20, the band released their second maxi single, "Boylife", which includes Japanese re-recordings of three of their past singles and the Japanese-language song "Count to Love".

On September 12, the band performed at the 2025 FIVB Men's Volleyball World Championship in Pasay on September 12 as "global celebrity ambassadors". Later that month, they announced their fifth EP, The Action, scheduled for release on October 20, supported by the single "Hollywood Action". The band released the promotional single "Say Cheese" on November 11, in collaboration with Warner Bros., to commemorate the 85th anniversary of the Tom and Jerry franchise.

=== 2026–present: Home ===
BoyNextDoor released their first studio album Home, on June 8, 2026, which includes the singles "Ddok Ddok Ddok" and "Viral". In August, they released the Japanese-language single "Boom Boom Boom", which was followed by a deluxe version of Home in September 28, led by the single "Animal".

== Artistry ==
=== Public image ===
With each member debuting in their late teens, BoyNextDoor was envisioned with a "boy next door" image. While the group initially drew comparisons to the similarly conceptualized girl group NewJeans, such comparisons were later discredited upon their debut, owing to the group's "self-produced" nature and their dance styles. Kim Jae-heun of The Korea Herald attributed the group's success to their "engaging storytelling, strong performances, and TV variety show appeal", which he deemed as defining characteristics of the group.

=== Music styles ===
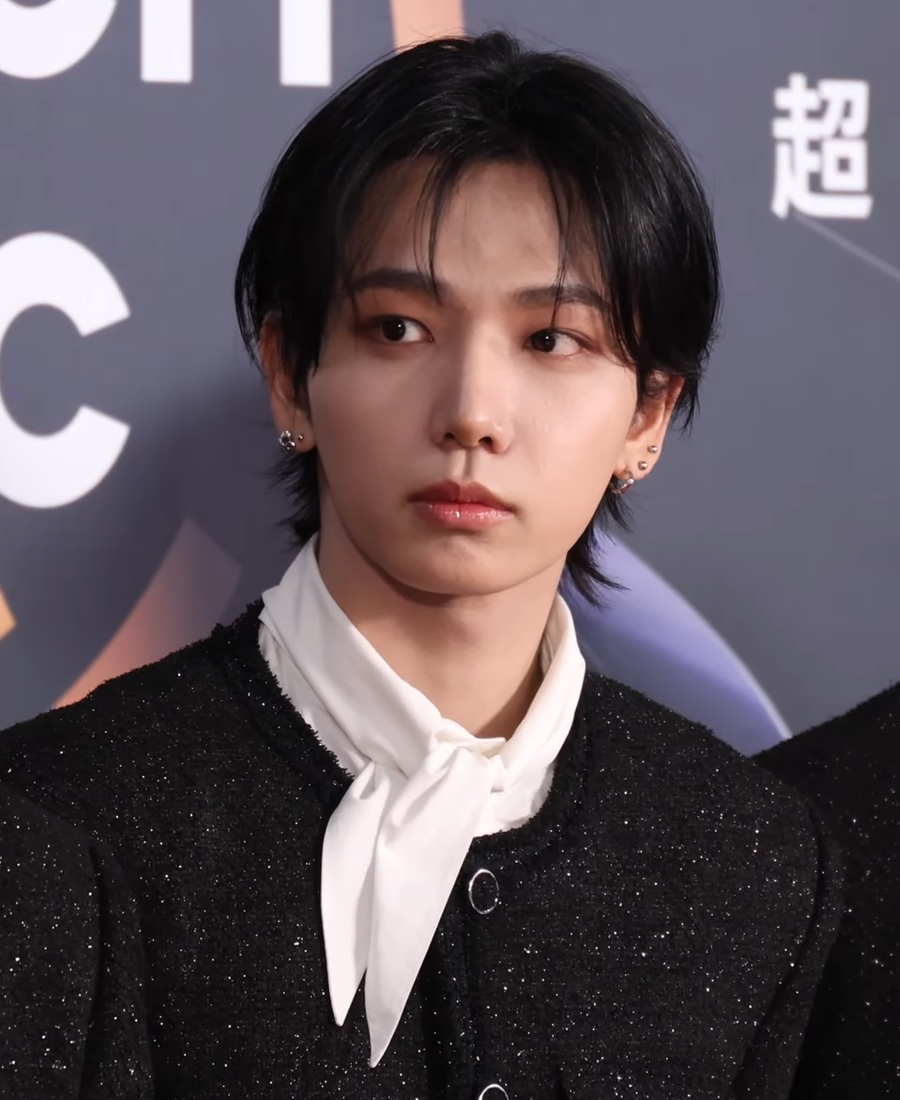
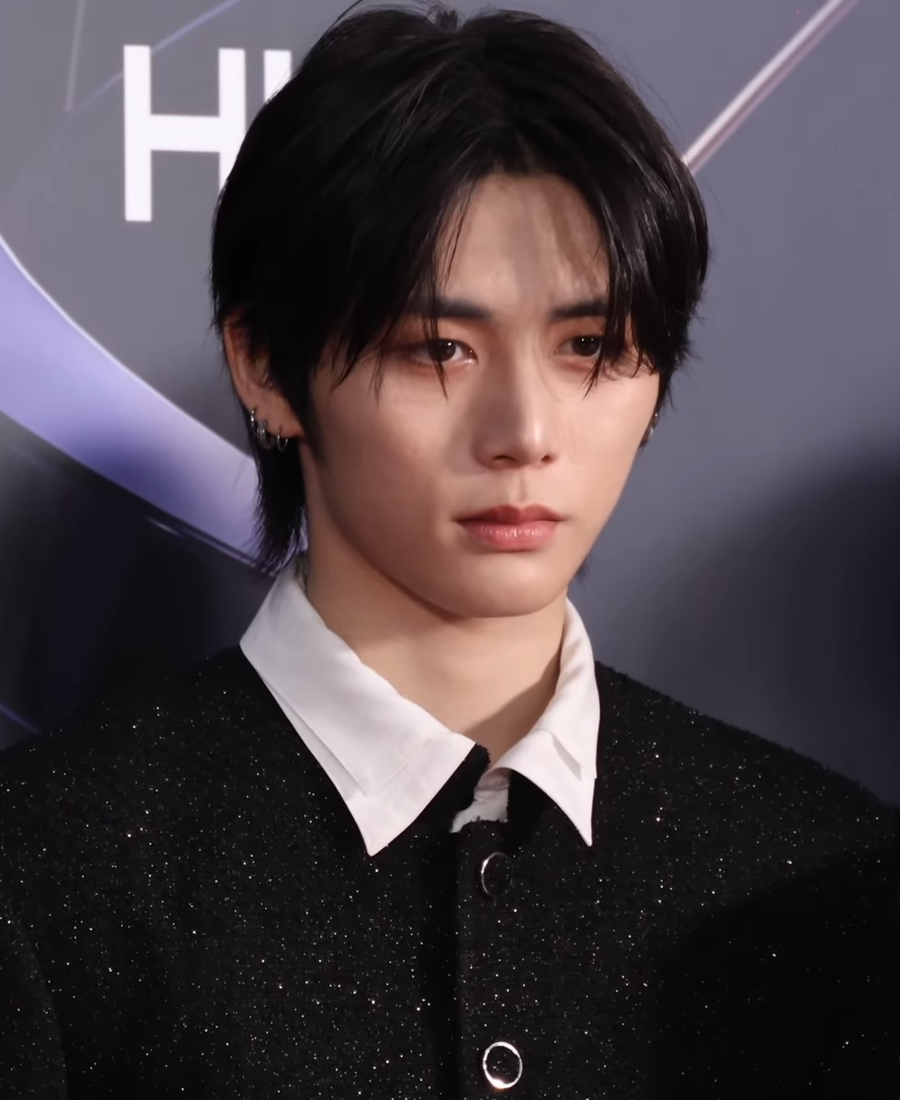
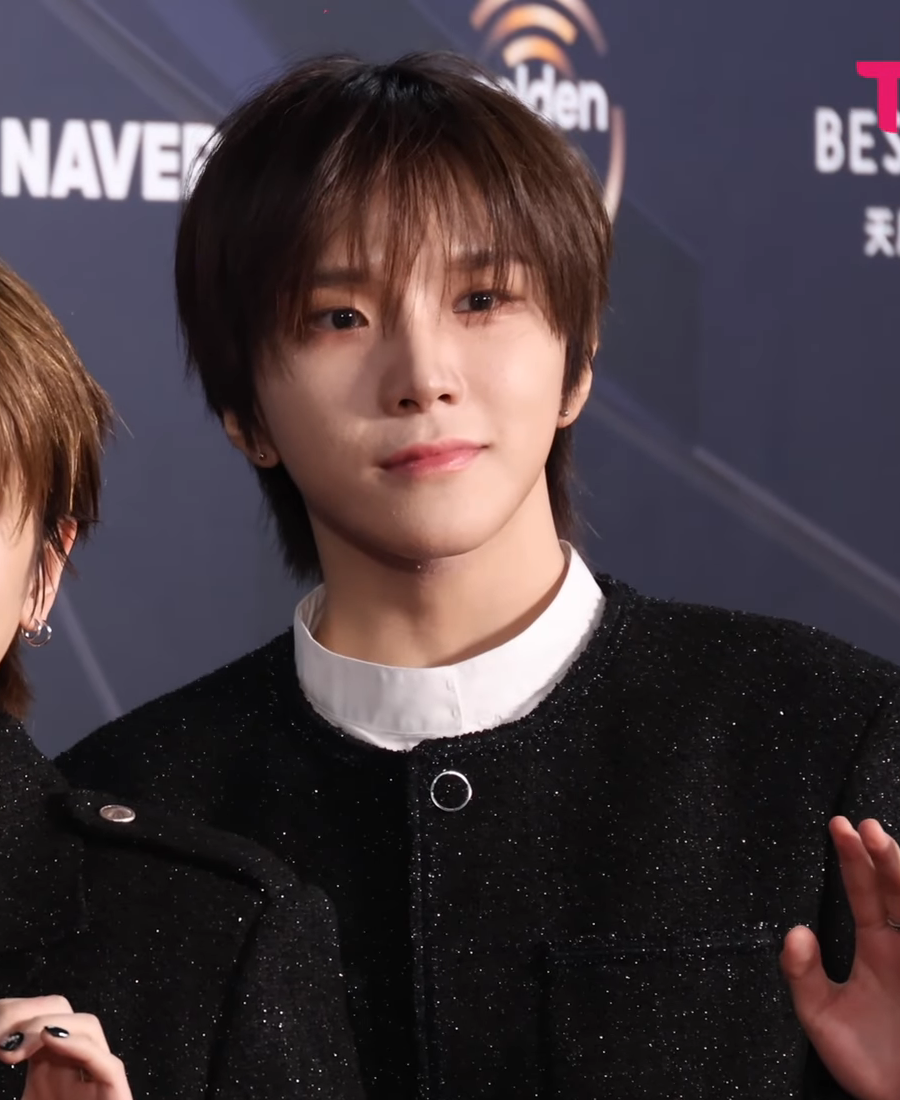
Members Myung Jaehyun (pictured left), Taesan (pictured middle), and Woonhak (pictured right) actively participate in the production of the group's music.

BoyNextDoor's music has been self-described as "easy listening and natural". Members Jaehyun, Taesan, and Woonhak actively involve themselves with the production of the group's music and largely aim to create music about "the daily lives of their peers". In the group's First love trilogy of Who!, Why.., and How?, BoyNextDoor explored a narrative of "first love and heartbreak", with Who! serving as an exposition, Why.. detailing the story's ending, and How? bridging the narrative between the two releases. The tracks from the trilogy were largely influenced by rock, teen pop, hip hop, hyperpop, and synth-pop.

In 19.99, the group began to focus on self-expression and introspection, reflecting on their experiences and anxieties around toward growing up. The following release, No Genre, was characterized by homages to the group's musical influences. While the group maintained an emphasis on storytelling with emotional depth, the EP explored pop subgenres including pop-soul and city pop.

== Members ==
Adapted from official website.

- Sungho (성호)
- Riwoo (리우)
- Myung Jaehyun (명재현) – leader
- Taesan (태산)
- Leehan (이한)
- Woonhak (운학)

== Discography ==
=== Studio albums ===
List of studio albums, showing selected details, chart positions, sales figures, and certifications
Title	Details	Peak chart positions				Sales	Certifications
Title	Details	KOR	JPN	JPN Hot	US	Sales	Certifications
Home	Released: June 8, 2026; Label: KOZ Entertainment; Formats: CD, digital download, streaming	1	1	1	16	KOR: 1,099,240; JPN: 159,073	RIAJ: Gold

=== Live albums ===
List of live albums, showing selected details, chart positions, sales figures, and certifications
Title	Details
BoyNextDoor Tour 'Knock On Vol.1' Final (Live)	Released: February 4, 2026; Label: KOZ Entertainment; Formats: Digital download, streaming

=== Extended plays ===
List of extended plays, showing selected details, chart positions, sales figures, and certifications
Title	Details	Peak chart positions				Sales	Certifications
Title	Details	KOR	JPN	JPN Hot	US	Sales	Certifications
Why..	Released: September 4, 2023; Label: KOZ Entertainment; Formats: CD, digital download, streaming	3	3	3	162	KOR: 621,828; JPN: 45,708	KMCA: 2× Platinum
How?	Released: April 15, 2024; Label: KOZ Entertainment; Formats: CD, digital download, streaming	1	1	1	93	KOR: 894,434; JPN: 83,748	KMCA: 2× Platinum
19.99	Released: September 9, 2024; Label: KOZ Entertainment; Formats: CD, digital download, streaming	1	1	1	40	KOR: 1,089,834; JPN: 155,708	KMCA: 3× Platinum; RIAJ: Gold
No Genre	Released: May 13, 2025; Label: KOZ Entertainment; Formats: CD, digital download, streaming	1	1	1	62	KOR: 1,395,342; JPN: 239,289	KMCA: Million; RIAJ: Platinum
The Action	Released: October 20, 2025; Label: KOZ Entertainment; Formats: CD, digital download, streaming	1	2	2	40	KOR: 1,229,832; JPN: 152,128	KMCA: Million; RIAJ: Platinum

=== Single albums ===
List of single albums, showing selected details, chart positions, sales figures, and certifications
Title	Details	Peak chart positions		Sales	Certifications
Title	Details	KOR	JPN	Sales	Certifications
Who!	Released: May 30, 2023; Label: KOZ Entertainment; Formats: CD, digital download, streaming	5	8	KOR: 383,131; JPN: 20,782	KMCA: Platinum

=== Singles ===
==== Korean singles ====
List of Korean singles, showing year released, selected chart positions, sales figures, and name of the album
Title	Year	Peak chart positions						Sales	Album
Title	Year	KOR	KOR Songs	JPN Cmb.	JPN Hot	TWN	WW	Sales	Album
"But I Like You" (돌아버리겠다)	2023	— (Note: "But I Like You" did not enter on the Circle Digital Chart but appeared at number 70 on the component Circle Download Chart.)	—	—	—	—	—	—N/a	Who!
"One and Only"	2023	— (Note: "One and Only" did not enter on the Circle Digital Chart but appeared at number 61 on the component Circle Download Chart.)	—	—	—	—	—	—N/a	Who!
"Serenade"	2023	— (Note: "Serenade" did not enter on the Circle Digital Chart but appeared at number 73 on the component Circle Download Chart.)	—	—	—	—	—	—N/a	Who!
"But Sometimes" (뭣 같아)	2023	96	—	—	—	—	—	—N/a	Why..
"Earth, Wind & Fire"	2024	85	—	—	—	—	—	—N/a	How?
"Dangerous" (부모님 관람불가)	2024	65	—	—	—	—	—	—N/a	19.99
"Nice Guy"	2024	42	24	—	53	—	—	—N/a	19.99
"If I Say, I Love You" (오늘만 I Love You)	2025	6	15	17	25	14	188	JPN: 1,285 (dig.)	No Genre
"I Feel Good"	2025	33	—	36	29	—	— (Note: "I Feel Good" did not enter on the Billboard Global 200 but appeared at number 181 on the Global Excl. US.)	—N/a	No Genre
"Hollywood Action"	2025	11	—	47	22	—	—	—N/a	The Action
"Ddok Ddok Ddok" (똑똑똑)	2026	79	—	—	—	—	—	—N/a	Home
"Viral"	2026	23	—	—	—	17	—	—N/a	Home
"Animal"	2026	107	—	—	93	—	—	—N/a	Home: Deluxe
"—" denotes releases that did not chart or were not released in that region.

==== Japanese singles ====
List of Japanese singles, showing year released, selected chart positions, sales figures, certifications, and name of the album
Title	Year	Peak chart positions			Sales	Certifications	Album
Title	Year	KOR	JPN	JPN Hot	Sales	Certifications	Album
"Earth, Wind & Fire" (Japanese version) (Note: Released under the title "And,".)	2024	—	2	—	JPN: 226,119 (phy.)	RIAJ: Platinum (phy.)	Non-album singles
"Count to Love" (Note: Released under the title "Boylife".)	2025	127	1	1	KOR: 22,677; JPN: 386,381 (phy.)	RIAJ: 2× Platinum (phy.)	Non-album singles
"—" denotes releases that did not chart or were not released in that region.

=== Promotional singles ===
List of promotional singles
Title	Year	Peak chart positions	Album
Title	Year	JPN Hot	Album
"It's Beginning to Look a Lot Like Christmas"	2024	—	Non-album single
"Say Cheese!"	2025	43	Non-album single
"Boom Boom Boom"	2026	64	Non-album single

=== Soundtrack appearances ===
List of soundtrack appearances
Title	Year	Peak chart positions		Album
Title	Year	KOR	JPN DL	Album
"Fadeaway"	2023	—	—	Garbage Time OST
"Lucky Charm"	2024	—	—	Miss Night and Day OST
"Never Loved This Way Before"	2025	36	60	Odd Girl Out OST
"Ruin My Life"	2025	— (Note: "Ruin My Life" did not enter on the Circle Digital Chart but appeared at number 68 on the component Circle Download Chart.)	—	Exchange 4 Part.1 OST
"One More Time, One More Chance"	2026	—	—	5 Centimeters per Second x Sungho (BoyNextDoor)
"No Doubt"	2026	—	—	Perfect Crown OST
"—" denotes releases that did not chart or were not released in that region.

=== Other charted songs ===
List of other charted songs
Title	Year	Peak chart positions		Album
Title	Year	KOR	JPN Hot	Album
"Crying"	2023	— (Note: "Crying" did not enter on the Circle Digital Chart but appeared at number 51 on the component Circle Download Chart.)	—	Why..
"ABCDLove"	2023	— (Note: "ABCDLove" did not enter on the Circle Digital Chart but appeared at number 52 on the component Circle Download Chart.)	—	Why..
"Our"	2024	— (Note: "Our" did not enter on the Circle Digital Chart but appeared at number 26 on the component Circle Download Chart.)	—	How?
"Amnesia"	2024	— (Note: "Amnesia" did not enter on the Circle Digital Chart but appeared at number 32 on the component Circle Download Chart.)	—	How?
"So Let's Go See the Stars"	2024	— (Note: "So Let's Go See the Stars" did not enter on the Circle Digital Chart but appeared at number 27 on the component Circle Download Chart.)	—	How?
"Life Is Cool"	2024	— (Note: "Life Is Cool" did not enter on the Circle Digital Chart but appeared at number 31 on the component Circle Download Chart.)	—	How?
"Dear. My Darling"	2024	— (Note: "Dear. My Darling" did not enter on the Circle Digital Chart but appeared at number 33 on the component Circle Download Chart.)	—	How?
"Earth, Wind & Fire" (English version)	2024	— (Note: "Earth, Wind & Fire" (English version) did not enter on the Circle Digital Chart but appeared at number 38 on the component Circle Download Chart.)	—	How?
"One and Only" (Japanese version)	2024	—	4	"And,"
"Gonna Be a Rock" (돌멩이)	2024	118	—	19.99
"Skit"	2024	— (Note: "Skit" did not enter on the Circle Digital Chart but appeared at number 13 on the component Circle Download Chart.)	—	19.99
"20" (스물)	2024	128	—	19.99
"Call Me"	2024	156	—	19.99
"Nice Guy" (English version)	2024	— (Note: "Nice Guy" (English version) did not enter on the Circle Digital Chart but appeared at number 17 on the component Circle Download Chart.)	—	19.99
"123-78"	2025	35	—	No Genre
"Step by Step"	2025	86	—	No Genre
"Is That True?" (장난쳐?)	2025	90	—	No Genre
"Next Mistake"	2025	100	—	No Genre
"Live in Paris"	2025	97	—	The Action
"Jam!"	2025	112	—	The Action
"Bathroom"	2025	105	—	The Action
"As Time Goes By" (있잖아)	2025	71	—	The Action
"06070"	2026	137	—	Home
"Adios!"	2026	95	—	Home
"Upside Down"	2026	115	—	Home
"Dive"	2026	135	—	Home
"Forever You" (기억해줘요)	2026	132	—	Home
"I Wonder"	2026	142	—	Home
"—" denotes releases that did not chart or were not released in that region.

== Videography ==
=== Music videos ===
Title	Year	Director(s)	Ref.
"But I Like You"	2023	Han Sa-min (Dextor-Lab)	
"One and Only"	2023	Seo Dong-hyeok (Flipevil)	
"Serenade"	2023	Han Sa-min (Dextor-Lab)	
"But Sometimes"	2023	Rima Yoon, DJ Jang (Rigend Film)	
"ABCDLove"	2023	Ha Jung-hoon, Lee Hye-sung (Hattrick)	
"Earth, Wind & Fire"	2024	Rima Yoon, DJ Jang (Rigend Film)	
"Earth, Wind & Fire" (Japanese ver.)	2024	Rima Yoon, DJ Jang (Rigend Film)	
"Dangerous"	2024	Hattrick	
"Nice Guy"	2024	725 (Sl8ight Visual Lab)	
"If I Say, I Love You"	2025	Lee Han-gyeol	
"Ddok Ddok Ddok"	2026	Oui Kim	

== Filmography ==
=== Reality shows ===
Year	Title	Notes	Ref.
2023	BoyNextDoor Tonight	Debut show	
2023–2025	Fun Next Door	Season 1–3	
2026	BoyNextDoor Tomodachi Base	Variety show	

== Tours and live performances ==
=== Headlining tours ===
- Knock On Vol.1 Tour (2024–2025)
- Knock On Vol.2 Tour (2026–2027)

=== Fan meetings ===
Date	Title	City	Country	Venue	Ref.
June 1, 2024	2024 Boynextdoor Fanmeeting OneDoorful Day	Seoul	South Korea	Olympic Hall	
June 2, 2024	2024 Boynextdoor Fanmeeting OneDoorful Day	Seoul	South Korea	Olympic Hall	

=== Festivals ===
Date	Title	City	Country	Venue	Ref.
April 15, 2024	KCON	Hong Kong		AsiaWorld–Expo	
May 10, 2024	KCON	Chiba	Japan	Makuhari Messe	
August 3, 2025	Lollapalooza	Chicago	USA	Grant Park (Chicago)	

== Accolades ==
=== Awards and nominations ===
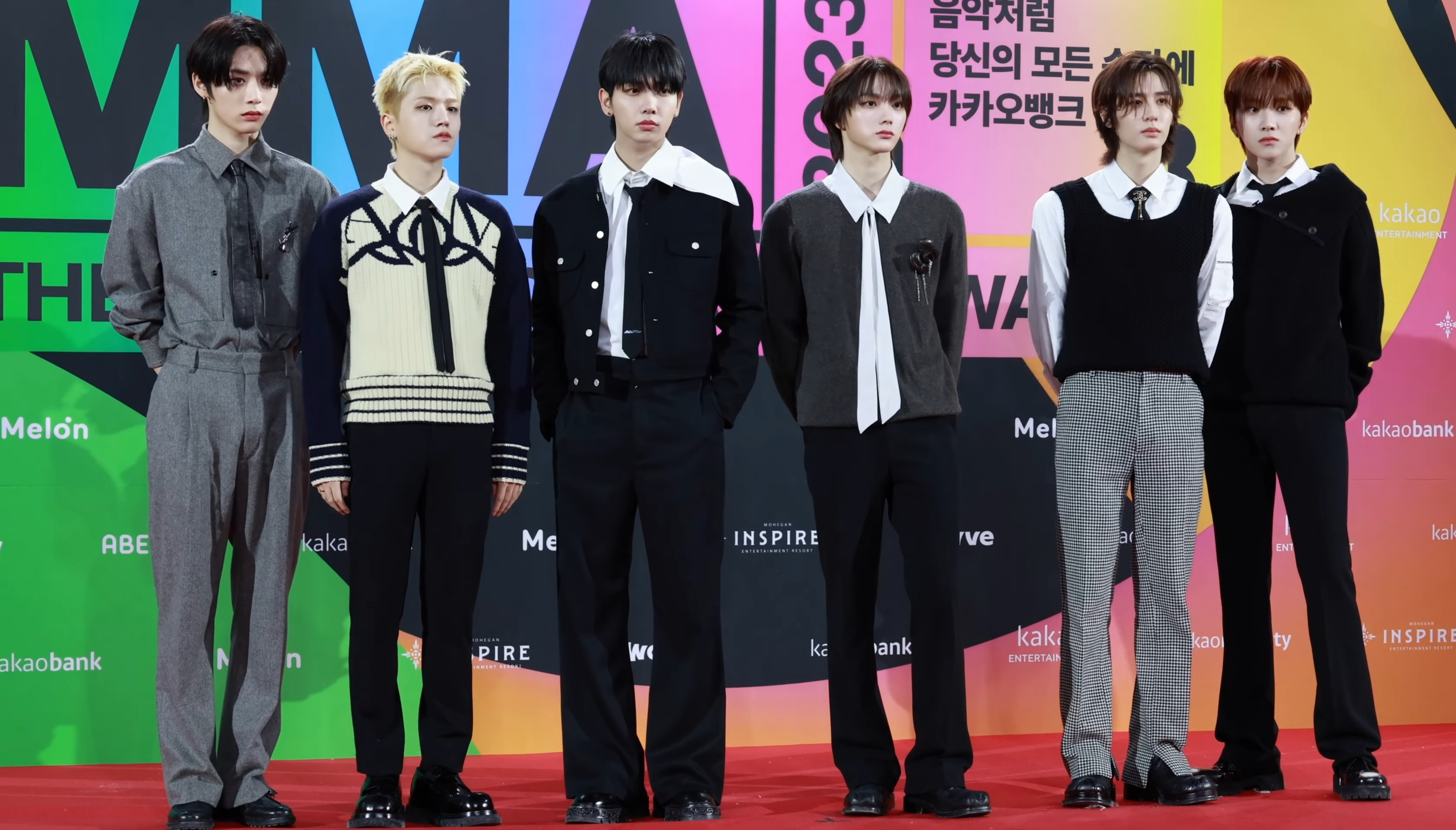
BoyNextDoor at the 2023 Melon Music Awards in December 2023

Name of the award ceremony, year presented, category, nominee of the award, and the result of the nomination
Award ceremony	Year	Category	Nominee / Work	Result	Ref.
Asia Artist Awards	2023	Best Choice Award	BoyNextDoor	Won	
Asia Artist Awards	2023	Best Emotive Award – Music	BoyNextDoor	Won	
Asia Artist Awards	2026	Popularity Award – Group (Male)	BoyNextDoor	Pending	
Asian Pop Music Awards (Note: Hosted by the Hong Kong Asia Pacific International Group and Sunway Records, the Asian Pop Music Awards bases its winners on the "Asian Pop Music Chart" which opened in September 2019.)	2023	Best New Artist (Overseas)	Why..	Nominated	
Brand of the Year Awards	2023	Rookie Male Idol	BoyNextDoor	Won	
Circle Chart Music Awards	2023	Rookie of the Year – Global Streaming	"But Sometimes"	Nominated	
Circle Chart Music Awards	2023	Rookie of the Year – Streaming Unique Listeners	"But Sometimes"	Nominated	
The Fact Music Awards	2023	Global Hottest Award	BoyNextDoor	Won	
The Fact Music Awards	2025	Artist of the Year (Bonsang)	BoyNextDoor	Won	
The Fact Music Awards	2025	World Best Wave	BoyNextDoor	Won	
Golden Disc Awards	2023	Rookie of the Year	BoyNextDoor	Nominated	
Golden Disc Awards	2024	Album Bonsang	19.99	Nominated	
Golden Disc Awards	2024	Most Popular Artist – Male	BoyNextDoor	Nominated	
Golden Disc Awards	2025	Digital Song Bonsang	"If I Say, I Love You"	Won	
Golden Disc Awards	2025	Digital Daesang (Song of the Year)	"If I Say, I Love You"	Nominated	
Golden Disc Awards	2025	Naver AI Choice	BoyNextDoor	Won	
Golden Disc Awards	2025	Most Popular Artist – Male	BoyNextDoor	Nominated	
Hanteo Music Awards	2023	Artist of the Year (Bonsang)	BoyNextDoor	Nominated	
Hanteo Music Awards	2023	Rookie of the Year – Male	BoyNextDoor	Nominated	
iHeartRadio Music Awards	2024	Best New K-pop Artist	BoyNextDoor	Nominated	
K-Global Heart Dream Awards	2023	K-Global Super Rookie Award	BoyNextDoor	Won	
Korea Grand Music Awards	2025	Best Artist 10	BoyNextDoor	Won	
Korea Grand Music Awards	2025	Grand Performer (Daesang)	BoyNextDoor	Won	
MAMA Awards	2023	Artist of the Year	BoyNextDoor	Nominated	
MAMA Awards	2023	Best New Male Artist	BoyNextDoor	Nominated	
MAMA Awards	2023	Worldwide Fans' Choice Top 10	BoyNextDoor	Nominated	
MAMA Awards	2024	Favorite Dance Performance – Male Group	BoyNextDoor	Won	
MAMA Awards	2024	Worldwide Fans' Choice Top 10	BoyNextDoor	Nominated	
MAMA Awards	2025	Best Male Group	BoyNextDoor	Nominated	
MAMA Awards	2025	Best Dance Performance – Male Group	BoyNextDoor	Nominated	
MAMA Awards	2025	Best OST	"Never Loved this Way Before" (from Odd Girl Out)	Nominated	
MAMA Awards	2025	Fans' Choice Top 10 – Male	BoyNextDoor	Nominated	
MAMA Awards	2025	Worldwide KCONER's Choice	BoyNextDoor	Nominated	
MAMA Awards	2025	Visa Super Stage Artist	BoyNextDoor	Nominated	
MAMA Awards	2025	Favorite Male Group	BoyNextDoor	Won	
Melon Music Awards	2023	Global Rising Artist	BoyNextDoor	Won	
Melon Music Awards	2023	Rookie of the Year	BoyNextDoor	Nominated	
Melon Music Awards	2024	Best Performance – Male	BoyNextDoor	Won	
Melon Music Awards	2024	Millions Top 10 Artist	19.99	Longlisted	
Melon Music Awards	2025	Millions Top 10 Artist	No Genre	Won	
Melon Music Awards	2025	Top 10 Artist	BoyNextDoor	Won	
Melon Music Awards	2025	Best Male Group	BoyNextDoor	Won	
Melon Music Awards	2025	Japan Favorite Artist by U-Next	BoyNextDoor	Won	
Melon Music Awards	2025	Artist of the Year	BoyNextDoor	Nominated	
Melon Music Awards	2025	Song of the Year	"If I Say, I Love You"	Nominated	
Melon Music Awards	2025	Berriz Global Fans' Choice	BoyNextDoor	Nominated	
Seoul Music Awards	2024	Rookie of the Year	BoyNextDoor	Nominated	
Seoul Music Awards	2025	Main Prize (Bonsang)	BoyNextDoor	Nominated	
Seoul Music Awards	2025	Popularity Award	BoyNextDoor	Nominated	
Seoul Music Awards	2025	K-Wave Special Award	BoyNextDoor	Nominated	
Seoul Music Awards	2025	K-pop World Choice – Group	BoyNextDoor	Nominated	

=== Listicles ===
Name of publisher, year listed, name of listicle, and placement
Publisher	Year	Listicle	Placement	Ref.
Forbes Korea	2025	K-Idol of the Year 30	21st	
