= Nice Guys =

Nice Guys may refer to:

- Nice Guys (film), a 2005 film directed by Joe Eckardt
- The Nice Guys, a 2016 film directed by Shane Black
  - The Nice Guys (soundtrack), the soundtrack for the 2016 film of the same name
- Nice Guys (album), a 1978 album by the Art Ensemble of Chicago
- "Nice Guys" (song), a 2010 song by We Are Scientists
- "Nice Guys", a 2021 song by Beach Bunny from Blame Game (EP)

== See also ==
- Nice Guy (disambiguation)
