= Mr. Nice Guy =

Mr. Nice Guy may refer to:

- Nice guy, a man who is agreeable, gentle, compassionate, sensitive, and vulnerable
- Mr. Nice Guy (1987 film), a Canadian comedy film
- Mr. Nice Guy (1997 film), a Hong Kong action comedy film
- Mr. Nice Guy (album), a 1983 album by Ronnie Laws
- Mr. Nice Guy (EP), a 2004 EP by Trine Dyrholm

== See also ==
- Nice Guy (disambiguation)
- No More Mr. Nice Guy (disambiguation)
