= No Genre (EP) =

- Digital cover

EP by BoyNextDoor
- Released: May 13, 2025
- Length: 17:28
- Languages: Korean; English
- Label: KOZ
- Producers: Pop Time; Kako; Zico

BoyNextDoor chronology
19.99 (2024)	No Genre (2025)	The Action (2025)

Singles from No Genre
- 1. "If I Say, I Love You" Released: January 6, 2025; 2. "I Feel Good" Released: May 13, 2025

No Genre is the fourth extended play (EP) by South Korean boy band BoyNextDoor, released on May 13, 2025, through KOZ Entertainment. Titled with an assertion of the band's approach to music, the EP seeks to embrace the band's creative freedom and artistry.

No Genre was produced by perennial collaborators Pop Time, Kako, and Zico, with active contributions from members Jaehyun, Taesan, and Woonhak. With the goal of the band's versatility, the EP was conceptualized as an exploration of several genres, including tracks with influences of city pop, pop-soul, funk, and hip-hop. The tracks also paid homage to past musical acts and emphasized emotional storytelling.

No Genre was preceded by the digital single "If I Say, I Love You", which was included in the track list for the EP. "I Feel Good" was released as the primary single.

== Background ==
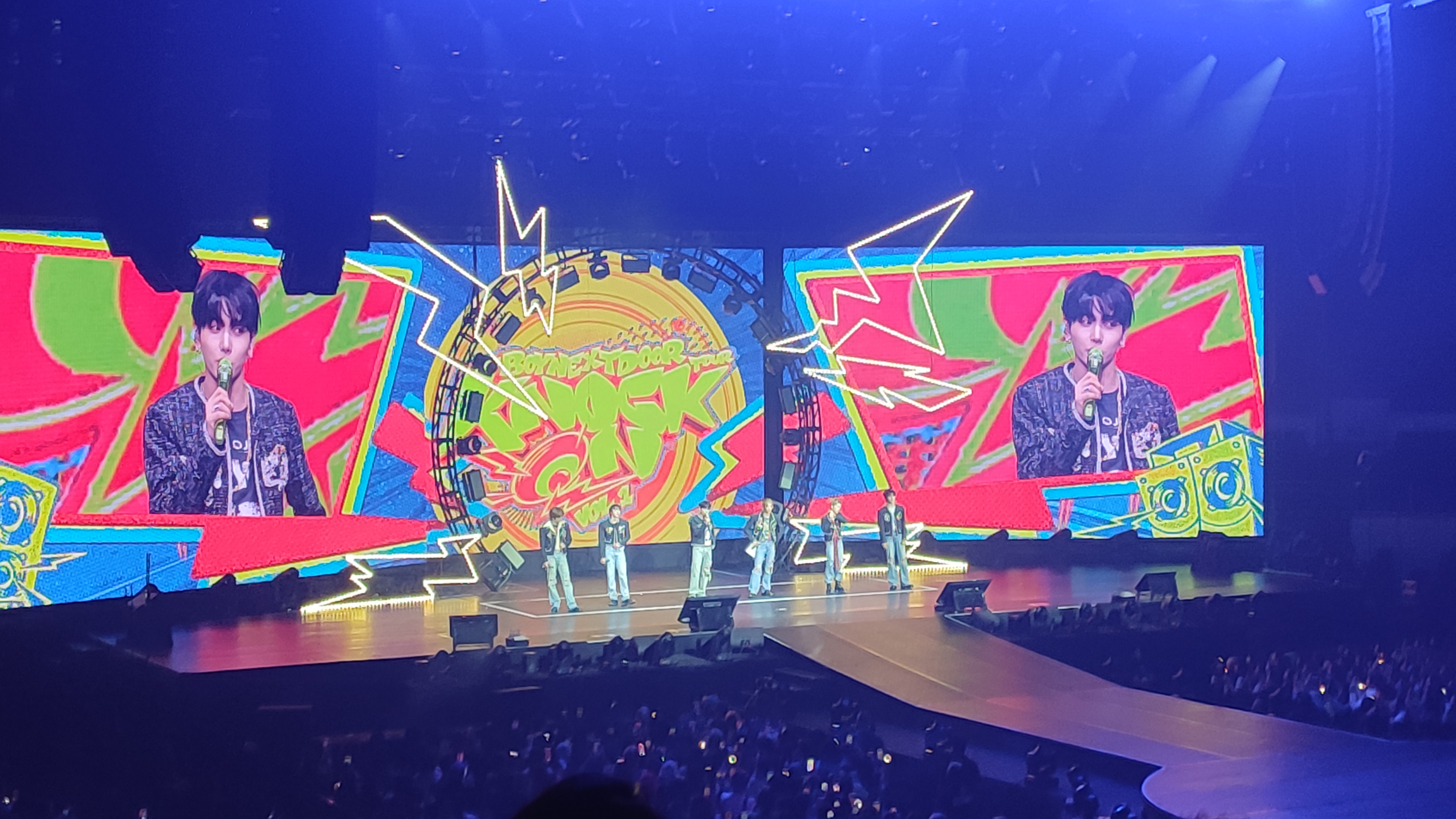
Details of the EP were initially announced during the Manila show of BoyNextDoor's Knock On Vol.1 Tour.

BoyNextDoor released their third extended play (EP), 19.99, in September 2024, which focused on self-expression and introspection, drawing from the group's experiences in their transition to adulthood. In support of 19.99 and its preceding releases, the band embarked on their first headlining concert tour, the Knock On Vol.1 Tour. While on tour, the band released the digital single, "If I Say, I Love You", to lukewarm critical reception.

== Music and lyrics ==
"There are two messages to 'No Genre,' which is to show the free-spirited fluidity of BoyNextDoor along with the broad range of our skill sets."

— Jaehyun, discussing the EP's themes

No Genre consists of seven tracks with a runtime of 17 minutes and 28 seconds. The EP's title seeks to reflect the band's creative freedom and resolute artistry, asserting an uncompromising approach to their work. Members Jaehyun, Taesan, and Woonhak contributed to the development of each track, with Woonhak participating in the production of all seven tracks.

Member Taesan billed the No Genre as a statement of the band's versatility for its exploration of several genres. The EP's tracks emphasized storytelling with emotional depth while paying homage to musical legacies that influenced the group.

=== Songs ===
The opening track, "123-78", is a love song with influences of the pop-soul stylings of the 1960s. The primary single "I Feel Good" expresses themes of carefree confidence with influences of hip-hop and funk. "Step by Step" is a city pop song with layered synth melodies. The following track, "Is That True?", is characterized by a bouncy beat with a funk-influenced rhythm. "Next Mistake" carries melancholic themes with subtle funk influences. The penultimate track, "If I Say, I Love You", is an upbeat dance-pop song that explores the emotion of "patheticness" as it reflects on the aftermath of a breakup in a self-deprecating light from the perspective of the "younger generation".

== Release and promotion ==
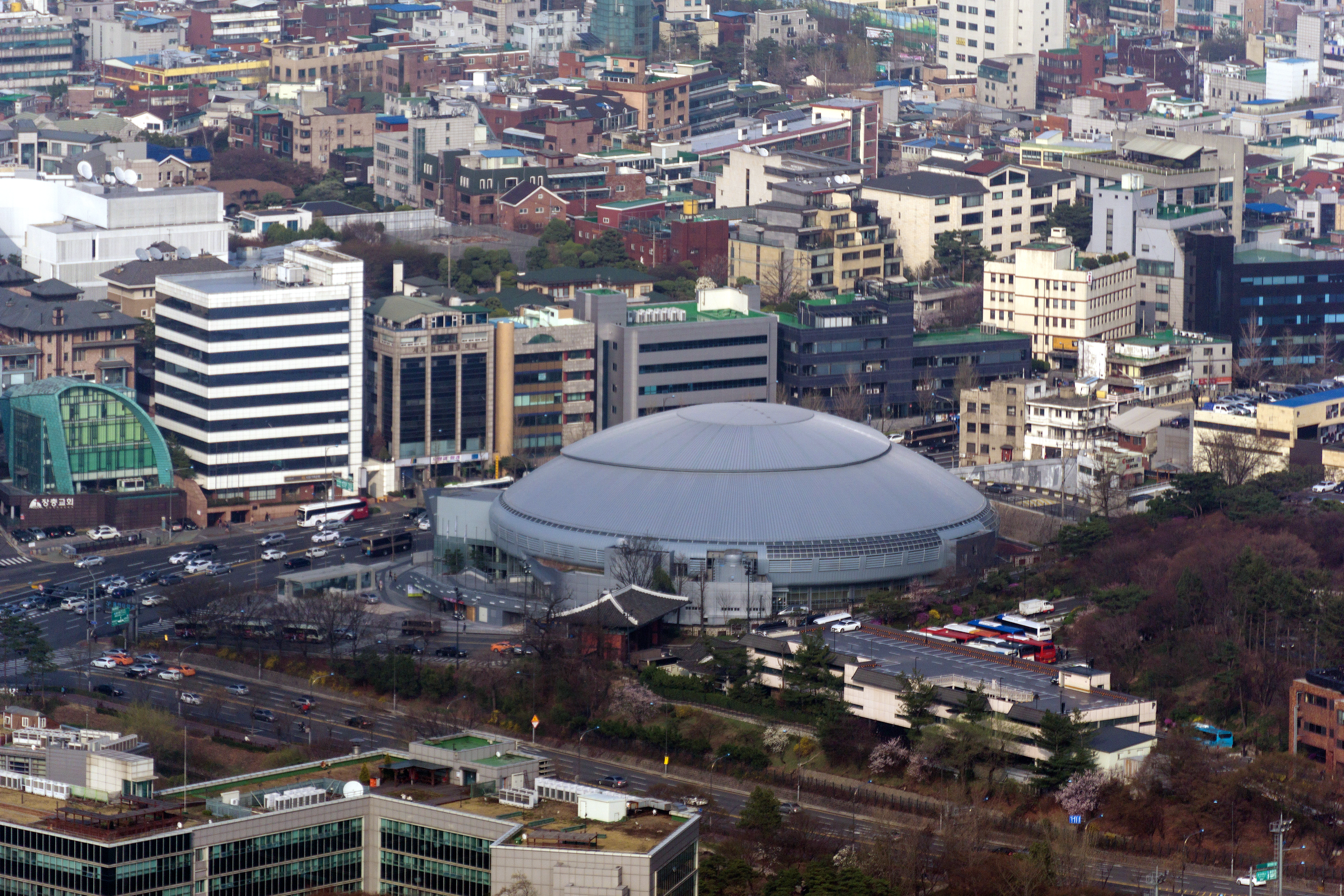
Jangchung Arena (pictured in 2015) will be the venue for the EP's comeback showcase.

No Genre was released on May 13, 2025, as BoyNextDoor's fourth extended play, eight months following the preceding EP 19.99. "I Feel Good" was released as a single alongside the EP. The single was the second of two tracks promoted in support of the EP, following "If I Say, I Love You", which was promoted in January as a digital single.

KOZ unveiled the record’s title and release date on April 14 through a purple-tinted animated clip featuring a character's silhouette in motion. A trailer film presented in an omnibus format followed on April 18, featuring the members in six different plotlines that correspond with a particular theme: "No Shame", No Pain", "No Harm", "No Drama", "No Feelings", and "No Posing".

The track listing was revealed on April 21. A promotional "sound check" will be released on May 1, followed by a "Sound Tour" track spoiler featuring snippets of the EP's tracks on May 5. Concept films and photos for the album's three themes—"No Matter", "No Route", "No Limit"—were sequentially published from April 23 to 29. The EP's release will be followed by a comeback showcase the following day at the Jangchung Arena in Jung District, Seoul.

== Commercial performance ==
In South Korea, No Genre sold 1,166,419 copies after five days from its release, marking the band's highest opening week sales, surpassing the preceding 19.99. The EP debuted on top of the Circle Album Chart for the issue dated May 22. In the United States, the EP debuted at number 62 on the Billboard 200 chart.

== Track listing ==
No Genre track listing
No.	Title	Writer(s)	Producer	Length
1.	"123-78"	Pop Time; Kako; Woonhak; Daily; Likey; Roho	Pop Time; Kako	2:40
2.	"I Feel Good"	Pop Time; Zico; Kako; Myung Jaehyun; Taesan; Woonhak; Nathan; Hoho	Pop Time; Zico; Kako	2:35
3.	"Step by Step"	Pop Time; Kako; Myung; Taesan; Woonhak; Coll' 8va (644ultramarine); Hyojin (644ultramarine)	Pop Time; Kako	2:29
4.	"Is That True?" (장난쳐?)	Pop Time; Kako; Taesan; Woonhak; Daily; Likey	Pop Time; Kako	2:09
5.	"Next Mistake"	Pop Time; Kako; Myung; Woonhak; Hey Farmer; Roho	Pop Time; Kako	2:19
6.	"If I Say, I Love You" (오늘만 I Love You)	Pop Time; Kako; Taesan; Woohak; Daily; Ryo; Likey; Zico	Pop Time; Kako	2:41
7.	"I Feel Good" (English version)	Pop Time; Zico; Kako; Myung; Taesan; Woonhak; Nathan; Hoho	Pop Time; Zico; Kako	2:35
Total length:				17:28

== Charts ==
=== Weekly charts ===
Weekly chart performance for No Genre
Chart (2025)	Peak position
Belgian Albums (Ultratop Flanders)	151
Belgian Albums (Ultratop Wallonia)	172
Croatian International Albums (HDU)	33
Greek Albums (IFPI)	17
Japanese Albums (Oricon)	1
Japanese Combined Albums (Oricon)	1
Japanese Hot Albums (Billboard Japan)	1
Scottish Albums (Official Charts)	29
South Korean Albums (Circle)	1
UK Albums Sales (OCC)	44
US Billboard 200	62
US World Albums (Billboard)	2

=== Monthly charts ===
Monthly chart performance for No Genre
Chart (2025)	Position
Japanese Albums (Oricon)	3
South Korean Albums (Circle)	3

=== Year-end charts ===
Year-end chart performance for No Genre
Chart (2025)	Position
Japanese Albums (Oricon)	24
Japanese Top Albums Sales (Billboard Japan)	28
South Korean Albums (Circle)	12

== Certifications ==
Certifications for No Genre
Region	Certification	Certified units/sales
Japan (RIAJ) Physical	Platinum	250,000^{^}
South Korea (KMCA)	Million	1,000,000^{^}
^{^} Shipments figures based on certification alone.

== Release history ==
Release dates and formats for No Genre
Region	Date	Format	Label
Various	May 13, 2025	CD; digital download; streaming	KOZ
