= How? (EP) =

- Digital cover

EP by BoyNextDoor
- Released: April 15, 2024
- Genres: Hip hop; synth-pop; hyperpop; rock ballad
- Length: 19:46
- Language: Korean
- Labels: KOZ; YG Plus
- Producers: AdelMade; Daily; Jez Dior; Kako; Likey; Myung Jae-hyun; PanDa (AdeMade); Pop Time; Ryo; Taesan; Chris Wallace; Woonhak; Xeno Vibe; Zico

BoyNextDoor chronology
Why.. (2023)	How? (2024)	19.99 (2024)

Singles from How?
- 1. "Earth, Wind & Fire" Released: April 15, 2024

How? is the second extended play (EP) by South Korean boy band BoyNextDoor, released on April 15, 2024, through KOZ Entertainment. The EP is the third and final installment of a trilogy of releases, following Who! (2023) and Why.. (2023). Introduced as a "kitschcore" album, How? looks back on a tumultuous first love narrated on the band's previous releases and examines why the subject relationship ended.

With members Jaehyun, Taesan, and Woonhak credited for writing, the EP contains seven tracks led by the single "Earth, Wind & Fire".

== Background ==
BoyNextDoor debuted on May 30, 2023, with the single album Who!, followed by the extended play Why.., released on September 4, 2023. The releases form part of a trilogy chronicling a love story, culminating with the third release of the band. On February 13, 2024, KOZ Entertainment released a statement confirming that preparations for the group's next release were underway, with a target release date set for April of that year.

== Music and lyrics ==
"Who! told the story of a crush, while Why.. detailed a breakup that followed. We wanted fans to wonder what happened in between the two albums."

— Sungho in a media showcase for How?

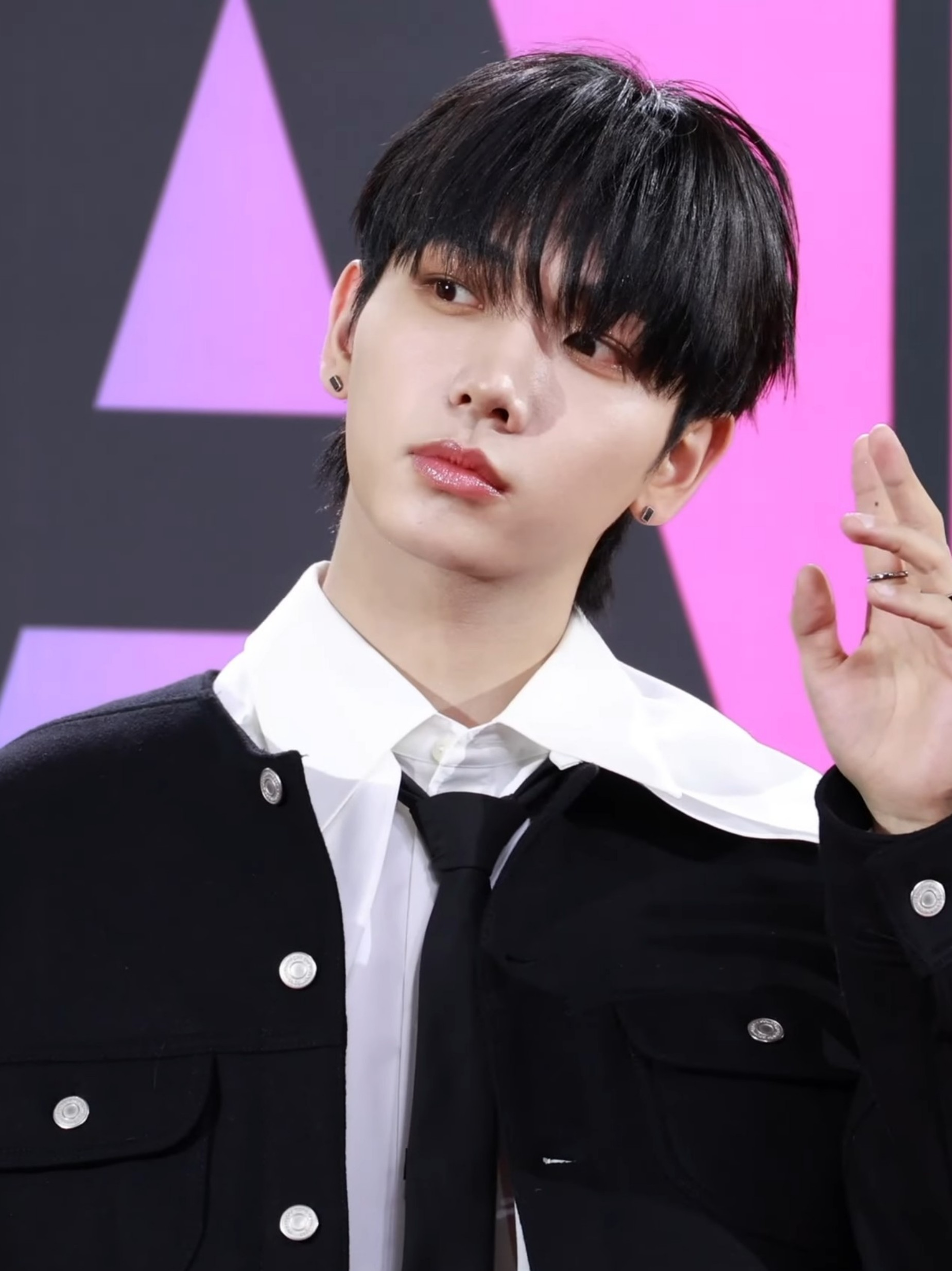
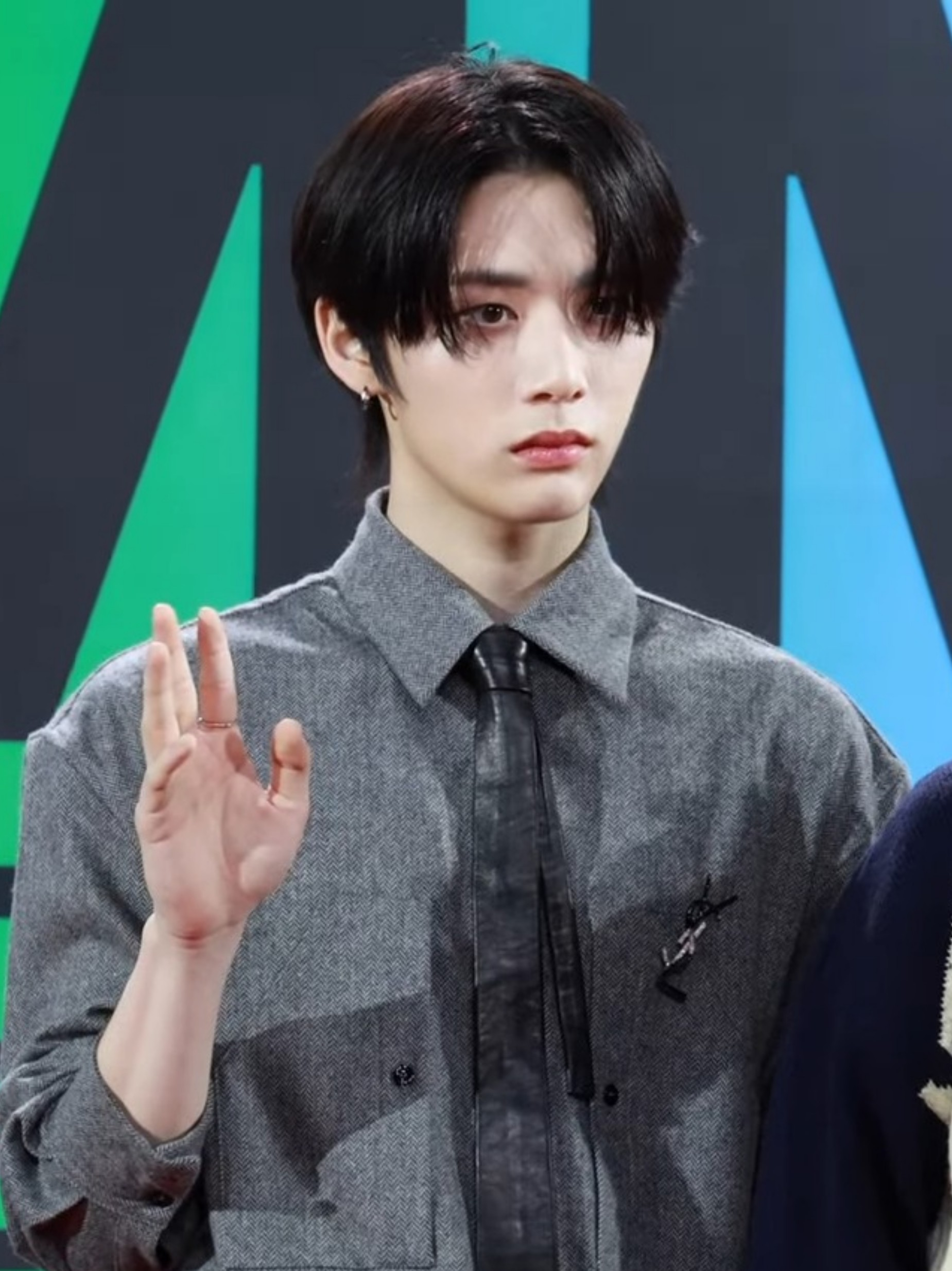
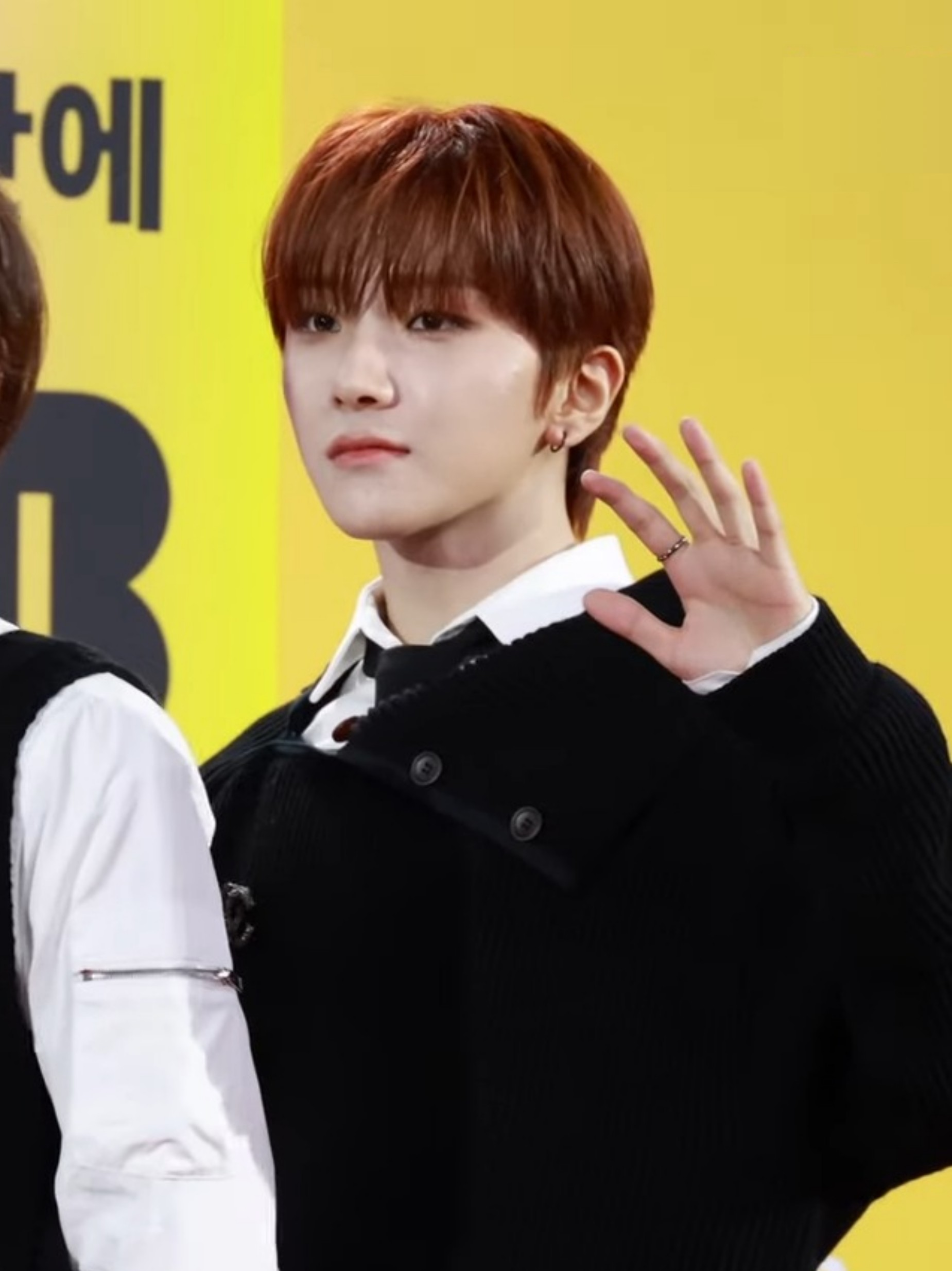
Members Jaehyun (pictured left), Taesan (pictured middle), and Woonhak (pictured right) are credited with writing and composing most of the EP's tracks.

How? has a runtime of 19 minutes and 46 seconds and consists of seven tracks. Members Jaehyun, Taesan, and Woonhak participated in composing and writing lyrics for the EP. Conceived as kitschcore (portmanteau for kitsch and normcore), the release's tracks are themed with a "kitsch style" in addition to the band's established "familiar, friendly image". Member Leehan explained that the style aims to be "effortlessly cool".

The songs written for the EP continue the story of a tumultuous "first love and heartbreak" chronicled in Who! and Why... Member Taesan explained that How? fills the gap between the two releases, where the former expressed the "heart-fluttering excitement of first love" while the latter narrated a "heartbreaking breakup". As the final installment in the group's "first love" trilogy, the EP looks back on the "stories between the band's first two releases" and examines "why the split took place".

=== Songs ===
The EP opens with the hip-hop song "Our", which discusses a "nervous and exciting first date". "Amnesia" compares a repeated cycle of quarrels and reconciliation to amnesia. The song is characterized by a "guitar riff and rhythmic drum beat". "So Let's Go See the Stars" is a synth-pop song envisioning a romantic first date. The lead single, "Earth, Wind & Fire", is a hyperpop song that narrates a "love that does not go as planned", comparing love to nature and the classical elements referenced in the title. The track "Life Is Cool" then discusses a youthful perspective on "love and life". The penultimate track, "Dear. My Darling", is a rock ballad sung as a letter to a lover that "accepts a breakup in a calm manner". The English version of "Earth, Wind & Fire" serves as the album's closing track.

== Release and promotion ==
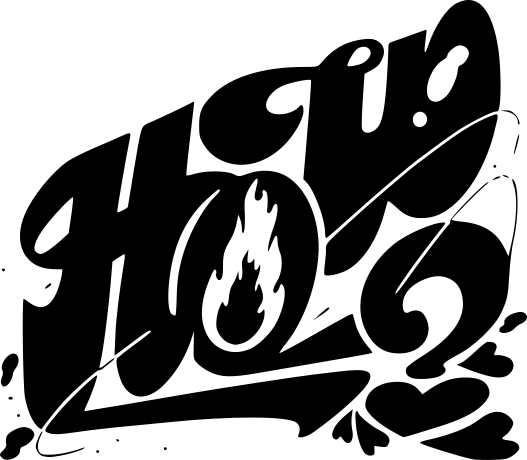
Logo used in promotional materials

On March 19, 2024, KOZ Entertainment announced the band's second extended play, titled How?, through a teaser video titled "How Can This Happen?", depicting the members experiencing a "strange phenomenon" as they go on with their daily lives. The track list of the EP was released on March 29, unveiling seven tracks with "Earth, Wind & Fire" as the lead single. BoyNextDoor unveiled the opening track "Our" in their performance at 2024 KCON Hong Kong on March 30, more than two weeks before the EP's release.

Concept images were released sequentially in the run-up to the album's release. For the album's "Earth" concept, the band is depicted "enjoying free time in an empty school". The "Wind" concept sees the band run around a house as a playground. In concept images for the "Fire" concept, the last set of concept images to be released, the members are depicted freely roaming the streets at night. A "track spoiler" previewing the album through a series of snippets was released on April 8.

KOZ Entertainment released How? on April 15, 2024, marking the band's first release in seven months. The release of the album was accompanied by a press showcase at the Yes24 Live Hall. In support of the EP, the television special BoyNextDoor Toni3ht aired on Mnet on the night of the album's release.

== Commercial performance ==
On April 12, 2024, three days before the release, YG Plus reported that How? had exceeded 571,600 pre-orders, reflecting a 40% increase from the preceding release Why... According to the Hanteo Chart, the EP sold 531,911 copies in its first week. How? debuted at number one at the Circle Album Chart for the issue dated April 20.

== Accolades ==
=== Listicles ===
Name of publisher, year listed, name of listicle, and placement
Publisher	Year	Listicle	Placement	Ref.
Billboard	2024	The 20 Best K-Pop Albums of 2024 (So Far): Staff Picks	17th	

== Track listing ==
How? track listing
No.	Title	Lyrics	Music	Producer	Length
1.	"Our"	Zico	Zico; Pop Time; Xeno Vibe	Zico; Pop Time (Zico, Pop TIme, Xeno Vibe)	2:36
2.	"Amnesia"	Kako; Taesan; Woonhak	Pop Time; Kako; Taesan; Woonhak; Ryo	Pop Time; Kako (Pop Time, Kako, Taesan, Woonhak, Ryo)	2:50
3.	"So Let's Go See the Stars"	Kako; Taesan; Woonhak	Pop Time; Kako; Taesan; Woonhak	Pop Time; Kako (Pop Time, Kako, Taesan, Woohhak, Ryo)	3:22
4.	"Earth, Wind & Fire"	Kako; Myung Jae-hyun; Taesan; Woonhak; Zico	Pop Time; Kako; Myung; Taesan; Zico	Pop Time; Kako; Zico; Myung; Taesan; Woonhak; Dally; Likey	2:59
5.	"Life Is Cool"	Kako; Myung; Taesan; Woonhak	Pop Time; Kako; Myung; Taesan; Woonhak	Pop Time; Kako (Pop Time, Kako, Myung, Taesan, Woonhak)	3:18
6.	"Dear. My Darling"	Kako; Myung; Taesan	Pop Time; Kako; Taesan; Ryo	Pop Time; Kako (Pop Time, Kako, Myung, Taesan, Ryo, Dunk)	1:40
7.	"Earth, Wind & Fire" (English version)			Pop Time; Kako; Zico; Myung; Taesan; Woonhak; Daly; Likey; Jez Dior; Chris Wallace; PanDa (AdeMade); AdelMade	2:59
Total length:					19:46

== Charts ==
=== Weekly charts ===
Weekly chart performance for How?
Chart (2024)	Peak position
Belgian Albums (Ultratop Flanders)	83
Greek Albums (IFPI)	62
Hungarian Physical Albums (MAHASZ)	9
Japanese Albums (Oricon)	1
Japanese Combined Albums (Oricon)	1
Japanese Hot Albums (Billboard Japan)	1
South Korean Albums (Circle)	1
US Billboard 200	93
US World Albums (Billboard)	3

=== Monthly charts ===
Monthly chart performance for How?
Chart (2024)	Peak position
Japanese Albums (Oricon)	3
South Korean Albums (Circle)	6

=== Year-end charts ===
Year-end chart performance for How?
Chart (2024)	Position
Japanese Albums (Oricon)	52
Japanese Hot Albums (Billboard Japan)	60
South Korean Albums (Circle)	33

== Certifications ==
Certifications for How?
Region	Certification	Certified units/sales
South Korea (KMCA)	2× Platinum	500,000^{^}
^{^} Shipments figures based on certification alone.

== Release history ==
Release dates and formats for How?
Region	Date	Format	Label	Ref.
Various	April 15, 2024	CD; digital download; streaming	KOZ; YG Plus	
