= 19.99 (EP) =

- Digital cover

EP by BoyNextDoor
- Released: September 9, 2024
- Length: 18:04
- Language: Korean
- Labels: KOZ; YG Plus
- Producers: Kako; Pop Time

BoyNextDoor chronology
How? (2024)	19.99 (2024)	No Genre (2025)

Singles from 19.99
- 1. "Dangerous" Released: September 2, 2024; 2. "Nice Guy" Released: September 9, 2024

19.99 is the third extended play (EP) by South Korean boy band BoyNextDoor, released on September 9, 2024, through KOZ Entertainment, five months following the preceding EP How? (2024). Reflecting on the process of coming of age, the EP departed from the narrative explored in the preceding three releases and focused on self-expression and introspection.

With members Jaehyun, Taesan, and Woonhak credited for writing the EP's tracks, 19.99 explores the anxieties of the youth before they turn twenty. The EP was supported by two singles: "Dangerous" and "Nice Guy".

== Background ==
BoyNextDoor defined their first three releases—Who! (2023), Why.. (2023), and How? (2024)—as part of the First Love trilogy, which explored a narrative of "first love and heartbreak". With the trilogy's culmination with How?, member Taesan remarked that the group would continue exploring "very relatable" topics on their next release. On July 24, 2024, The Chosun Ilbo reported that the group was finalizing its forthcoming release, with a release set for September.

== Music and lyrics ==
The album contains all the complicated feelings that you come across as you close in on the age of 20

— Jaehyun, in a showcase for 19.99

19.99 consists of seven tracks with a runtime of 18 minutes and four seconds. Exploring the anxieties of youth before they turn twenty, the EP departs from the narratives explored in the group's previous releases and focuses on self-expression and introspection. Drawing from personal experiences, members explored the "pivotal moment of a 19-year-old transitioning into 20 years old [sic]" with an autobiographical approach.

=== Songs ===
19.99 opens with the raucous hip-hop track "Dangerous", which narrates a nighttime escape and expresses themes of rebellion and youth. "Gonna Be a Rock" explores a heartache. Inspired by hip-hop albums, an interlude titled "Skit" precedes the single "Nice Guy". "Nice Guy" is a synth-pop number that expresses declarative self-confidence with an anthemic tone. The following track "20" is dedicated to the youth, with lyrics developed during Jaehyun's visit to his old neighborhood. The closing track, "Call Me", was heavily inspired by a "comforting text" that Taesan received from his father, which later became the basis of the song's chorus.

An English version of "Nice Guy" is also featured on the EP.

== Release and promotion ==
KOZ Entertainment announced the EP's title and release date on August 12 through a teaser trailer titled "The Beginning of Countdown: 19.99". The 16-second teaser trailer features a push-button telephone lying on a puddle, rapidly counting down before being picked up by the members who then walk away. 19.99 was released on September 9, 2024, as BoyNextDoor's third extended play (EP), with "Nice Guy" marketed as the EP's main single. The album's release was preceded by the pre-release single "Dangerous" on September 2.

Two skits related to the album's theme were released in the lead-up to the EP's release: "Starting Your 20s" on August 16 and "How to Flirt" on September 6. Images from themed photoshoots depicting an album concept—"Nice", "Dangerous", and "Twenty"—were released and featured in promotional material for the EP.

== Commercial performance ==
According to the Hanteo Chart, the 19.99 sold 759,156 copies in its first week, surpassing the first-week tally of the band's preceding release How?. The EP debuted atop the Oricon Albums Chart for the week succeeding its release with 134,000 copies sold. The EP debuted at number three at the Billboard Top Album Sales chart with 16,500 copies sold, marking the group's third and best appearance on the chart. On October 24, 2024, the EP surpassed one million copies in cumulative sales, per data published by YG Plus.

== Track listing ==
All tracks are produced by Pop Time and Kako.

19.99 track listing
No.	Title	Writer(s)	Length
1.	"Dangerous" (부모님 관람불가; lit. 'Restricted to Parents')	Pop Time; Kako; Myung Jae-hyun; Taesan; Woonhak	2:23
2.	"Gonna Be a Rock" (돌멩이)	Pop Time; Kako; Myung; Taesan; Woonhak; Nathan	3:17
3.	"Skit"	Pop Time; Kako	1:06
4.	"Nice Guy"	Pop Time; Kako; Zico; Myung; Taesan; Woonhak; Daily; Likey	2:44
5.	"20" (스물)	Pop Time; Kako; Myung; Taesan; Woonhak; Daily; Likey	2:48
6.	"Call Me"	Pop Time; Kako; Myung; Taesan; Woonhak; Daily; Likey; Roho	2:58
7.	"Nice Guy" (English version)	Pop Time; Kako; Zico; Myung; Taesan; Woonhak; Daily; Likey; Jez Dior; Chris Wallace; Kkannu (AdeMade); Dian J (AdeMade); AdeMade	2:44
Total length:			18:04

== Credits and personnel ==
Studio

- HYBE Studio – recording (all tracks), digital editing (tracks 2, 6–7)
- Dream Studio – recording (track 3)
- Klang Studio – mixing (track 3), digital editing (track 1)
- 821 Sound Mastering – mastering (all tracks)

Personnel

- Pop Time – lyrics (tracks 1–2, 4–6), composition (tracks 1–2, 4–6), arrangement (tracks 1–6), keyboard (track 3)
- Kako – lyrics (tracks 2, 6–7), composition (tracks 2, 6–7), keyboard (tracks 3, 6–7), chorus (tracks 2, 7)
- Nathan – lyrics (track 2), composition (track 2), arrangement (track 2), keyboard (track 2), chorus (track 2)
- Moon Seol-ri – lyrics (track 5)
- Roho – lyrics (track 6)
- Zico – lyrics (tracks 1, 4, 7)
- Daley – composition (tracks 4, 6–7), arrangement (tracks 4, 6–7)
- Likey – composition (tracks 4, 6–7), arrangement (tracks 4, 6–7)
- Daily – composition (tracks 4, 6–7), arrangement (tracks 4, 6–7)
- Kim Seong-hun (ASST. Kim Gwi-seon) – recording, mixing (track 3)
- Kim Bo-seong – recording (tracks 1–2, 4, 6–7), digital editing (track 2)
- Jeong Jae-wook – recording (track 2)
- Lee Yong-sang – recording (track 2)
- Jeon Ji-hwan – digital editing (tracks 2, 6–7)
- Kim Gwi-seon – digital editing (track 1)
- Kwon Nam-woo – mastering (all tracks)
- Jvde – chorus (track 1)
- Young Chance – chorus (track 6)
- Gesture – chorus (track 6)
- Rip – guitar (tracks 2, 4, 6)
- Chris Wallace – lyrics (track 7)
- Khamari (aka Khamari) – lyrics (track 7)
- Disa (aka Disa) – lyrics (track 7)

== Charts ==
=== Weekly charts ===
Weekly chart performance for 19.99
Chart (2024)	Peak position
Belgian Albums (Ultratop Flanders)	83
Croatian International Albums (HDU)	7
French Albums (SNEP)	78
Greek Albums (IFPI)	35
Hungarian Physical Albums (MAHASZ)	10
Japanese Albums (Oricon)	1
Japanese Combined Albums (Oricon)	1
Japanese Hot Albums (Billboard Japan)	1
South Korean Albums (Circle)	1
Swedish Physical Albums (Sverigetopplistan)	20
US Billboard 200	40
US World Albums (Billboard)	1

=== Monthly charts ===
Monthly chart performance for 19.99
Chart (2024)	Peak position
Japanese Albums (Oricon)	1
South Korean Albums (Circle)	2

=== Year-end charts ===
Year-end chart performance for 19.99
Chart (2024)	Position
Japanese Albums (Oricon)	26
Japanese Hot Albums (Billboard Japan)	33
South Korean Albums (Circle)	27

== Certifications ==
Certifications for 19.99
Region	Certification	Certified units/sales
Japan (RIAJ)	Gold	100,000^{^}
South Korea (KMCA)	3× Platinum	750,000^{^}
^{^} Shipments figures based on certification alone.

== Release history ==
Release dates and formats for 19.99
Region	Date	Format	Label
Various	September 9, 2024	CD; digital download; streaming	KOZ; YG Plus
