= The Action (EP) =

- Digital cover

EP by BoyNextDoor
- Released: October 20, 2025
- Length: 12:56
- Languages: Korean; English
- Label: KOZ
- Producers: Pop Time; Kako; Zico

BoyNextDoor chronology
| No Genre (2025) | The Action (2025) | BoyNextDoor Tour 'Knock On Vol.1' Final (Live) (2026) |

Singles from The Action
- 1. "Hollywood Action" Released: October 20, 2025

The Action is the fifth extended play (EP) by South Korean boy band BoyNextDoor. It was released on October 20, 2025, through KOZ Entertainment. Produced with Pop Time, Kako, and Zico, the EP revolves around the members' aspirations for self-improvement.

The Action is composed of five tracks, with the lead single "Hollywood Action" to be released concurrently with the EP. BoyNextDoor conceptualized and portrayed the fictitious Chicago-based film production crew "Team the Action" in promotional media for the release.

== Background ==
On May 13, 2025, BoyNextDoor released their fourth extended play (EP), No Genre, which they conceived as a statement of their artistry and homage to the group's musical influences. During promotions for the EP, the band performed at the music festival Lollapalooza in Chicago, marking their debut appearance at the annual event. In September, the band confirmed to music magazine Ize that they were in the final stages of preparation for their next release, which they slated for October.

== Music and lyrics ==
The Action is composed of five tracks and has a runtime of 12 minutes and 56 seconds. Members Jaehyun, Taesan, and Woonhak wrote and produced the album with frequent collaborators Pop Time, Kako, and Zico, together with Chance Park, Daily, Likey, and Roho. According to Hybe and KOZ Entertainment, the EP's themes revolve around the members' aspirations for self-improvement toward becoming "better versions of themselves".

=== Songs ===
The opening track, "Live in Paris", utilizes the time difference between South Korea and Paris to narrate the all-nighters taken by the band. "Hollywood Action" expresses the confident, assertive attitude typical of a Hollywood film star. "Jam!" is inspired by the experiences of holding a jam session among friends. "Bathroom" narrates the emotional turmoil in a conflict between lovers. The EP closes with "As Time Goes By", a ballad about a narrator who struggles to leave a relationship.

== Marketing ==
=== Concept ===
The Action is titled after "Team The Action", a fictitious film production crew portrayed by members of BoyNextDoor. Promotional media follows the crew's endeavors in filming a movie in Chicago—a location decided by a game of darts—for an entry to the Chicago Film Festival. The storyline concludes in the music video for "Hollywood Action", where the crew achieves a win in the competition.

=== Promotion ===
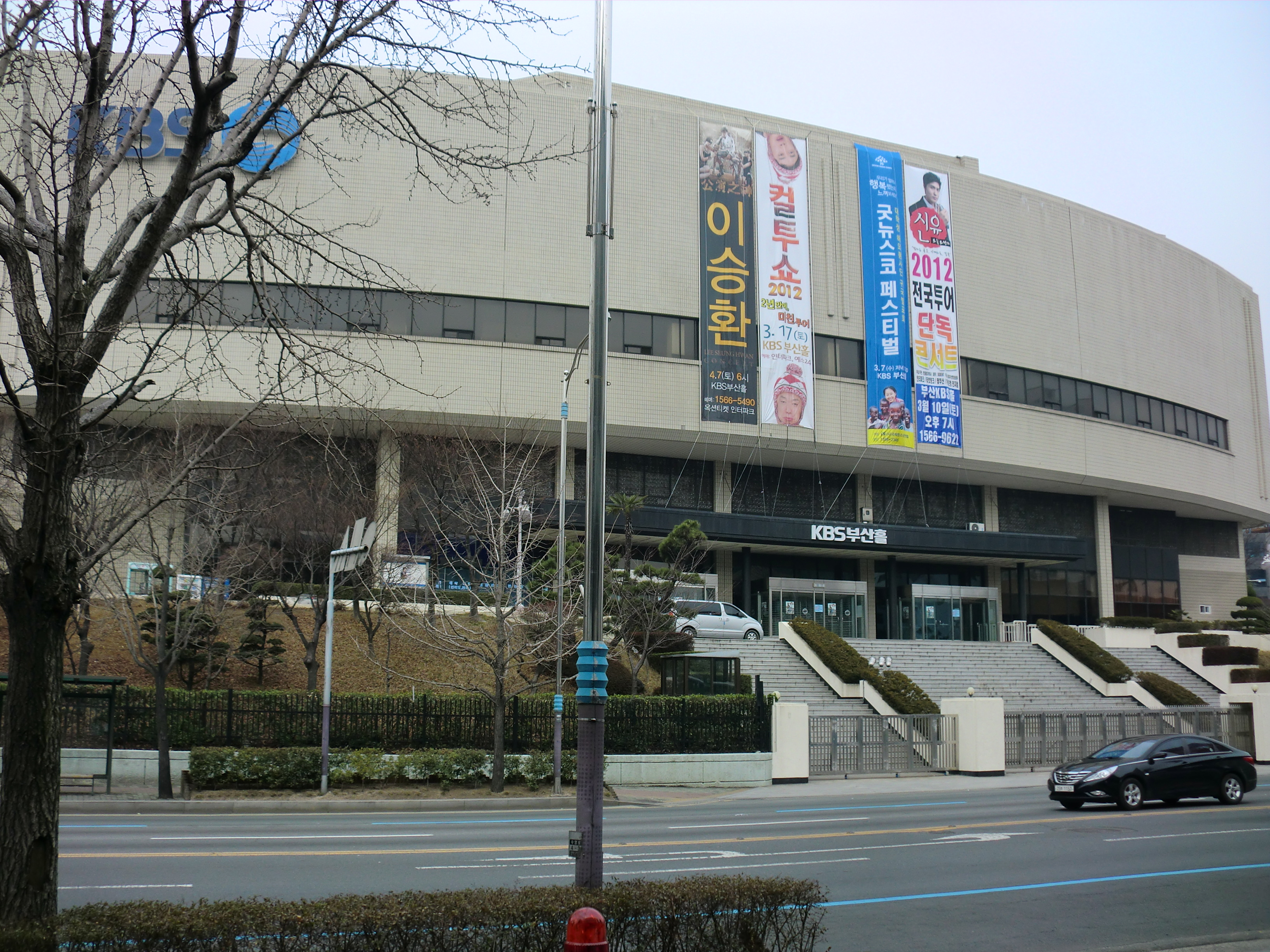
KBS Hall (pictured in 2013), venue for the EP's comeback showcase

Hybe and KOZ Entertainment announced The Action on September 23, 2025, as BoyNextDoor's fifth extended play. The same day, the band released a trailer for the EP, depicting themselves as Team The Action for the first time. A website for EP went live the following day, displaying its promotion schedule superimposed on a stylized satellite navigation map.

On September 26, the band released a vlog-style video as Team The Action, depicting the lives of the fictional film production crew. Concept films and photos for the album's three themes—"Play", "Loading", and "Pause"—were sequentially released from September 29 to October 10. The EP's track listing was announced through a street view-inspired trailer on October 3.

Hybe and KOZ Entertainment released The Action on October 20, 2025, concurrently with the lead single "Hollywood Action". The same day, the band held a comeback showcase for the EP at the KBS Hall.

== Track listing ==
The Action track listing
| No. | Title | Writer(s) | Producer | Length |
|---|---|---|---|---|
| 1. | "Live in Paris" | Pop Time; Kako; Chance Park; Taesan; Woonhak | Pop Time; Kako | 1:57 |
| 2. | "Hollywood Action" | Pop Time; Kako; Daily; Myung Jae-hyun; Taesan; Woonhak; Leehan | Pop Time; Zico; Kako | 2:28 |
| 3. | "Jam!" | Pop Time; Zico; Taesan; Woonhak | Pop Time; Zico | 2:28 |
| 4. | "Bathroom" | Pop Time; Kako; Daily; Likey; Myung; Taesan; Woonhak | Pop Time; Kako | 2:20 |
| 5. | "As Time Goes By" (있잖아) | Pop Time; Kako; Myung; Taesan; Woonhak; Roho | Pop Time; Kako | 3:43 |
| Total length: | | | | 12:56 |

== Charts ==
=== Weekly charts ===
Weekly chart performance
| Chart (2025) | Peak position |
|---|---|
| Belgian Albums (Ultratop Flanders) | 103 |
| Croatian International Albums (HDU) | 19 |
| Greek Albums (IFPI) | 6 |
| Japanese Albums (Oricon) | 2 |
| Japanese Combined Albums (Oricon) | 2 |
| Japanese Hot Albums (Billboard Japan) | 2 |
| South Korean Albums (Circle) | 1 |
| US Billboard 200 | 40 |
| US Independent Albums (Billboard) | 5 |
| US World Albums (Billboard) | 1 |

=== Monthly charts ===
Monthly chart performance
| Chart (2025) | Position |
|---|---|
| Japanese Albums (Oricon) | 4 |
| South Korean Albums (Circle) | 2 |

=== Year-end charts ===
Year-end chart performance
| Chart (2025) | Position |
|---|---|
| Japanese Albums (Oricon) | 42 |
| Japanese Top Albums Sales (Billboard Japan) | 43 |
| South Korean Albums (Circle) | 16 |

== Certifications ==
Certifications
| Region | Certification | Certified units/sales |
|---|---|---|
| Japan (RIAJ) Physical | Platinum | 250,000^{^} |
| South Korea (KMCA) | Million | 1,000,000^{^} |
^{^} Shipments figures based on certification alone.

== Release history ==
Release dates and formats
| Region | Date | Format | Version | Label |
|---|---|---|---|---|
| Various | October 20, 2025 | CD; digital download; streaming; Weverse album | Standard (Note: The physical variants are titled "Play", "Loading", "Pause", and "Frame".) | KOZ |
