= Earth, Wind & Fire (song) =

2024 single by BoyNextDoor

- Japanese version single cover

Single by BoyNextDoor

from the EP How?
- Language: Korean
- Released: April 15, 2024
- Genre: Hyperpop
- Length: 2:59
- Label: KOZ
- Composers: Pop Time; Kako; Myung Jae-hyun; Taesan; Zico
- Lyricists: Kako; Myung Jae-hyun; Taesan; Woonhak; Zico

BoyNextDoor singles chronology
| "But Sometimes" (2023) | "Earth, Wind & Fire" (2024) | "Earth, Wind & Fire" (Japanese version) (2024) |

Music video
- Earth, Wind & Fire on YouTube

"Earth, Wind & Fire" is a song recorded by South Korean boy band BoyNextDoor for their second extended play (EP) How? (2024). It was released on April 15, 2024, through KOZ Entertainment as the EP's lead single. Members Jaehyun, Taesan, and Woonhak wrote the song alongside producers Zico and Kako. Described as a hyperpop song, the lyrics narrate on a love story compared to the classical elements.

A Japanese version of the song was released on June 19, 2024, through Universal Music Japan as part of the group's debut Japanese maxi single "And,".

== Background and release ==
On March 19, 2024, KOZ Entertainment announced BoyNextDoor's second extended play (EP) How?, marking their first release in seven months and forming the final part of their trilogy of releases narrating a story of a "first love".

On March 29, the track list for the EP was released, with "Earth, Wind & Fire" marked as the lead single". A snippet of the track was released on April 8, as part of a "track spoiler" preview for the EP. A 23-second teaser for the single's music video was released on April 12, three days before the EP's release.

On February 13, 2026, the group released a remixed version of the song as part of their collaboration with South Korean instant noodle brand Buldak Ramen.

== Composition ==
"The killer part of the lead single is the sped-up section and the chorus where we spit out the lyrics at machine gun speed"

— Sungho, in a media showcase for How?

"Earth, Wind & Fire" has a runtime of two minutes and 59 seconds. The song was written by members Jaehyun, Taesan, and Woonhak, alongside producers Zico and Kako. A hyperpop song, the track discusses a "love that does not go as planned". Member Sungho remarked that the song's lyrics narrates a plot that "develops and changes constantly". Lyrically, the song likens love to the "unpredictable nature" of the classical elements.

Member Jaehyun drew inspiration from the British film franchise Kingsman in writing the song. Envisioning a character "exuding confidence and charm yet revealing vulnerability in intimate moments", Jaehyun aimed to "infuse a sense of gentleness" into the song. Member Riwoo stated that the song expresses the "frustration that runs through your mind when you're in love but nothing goes as planned". The track features a "sped-up" section that delivers the lines in a fast-pace.

At a media showcase, the members clarified that the song's title bears no relation to the American band Earth, Wind & Fire. An English version of the track is featured on the EP, and serves as its closing track.

== Music video ==
The music video for "Earth, Wind & Fire" was released in conjunction with the single and the EP. Themed after the kitschcore aesthetic of How?, the music video conveys the "unpredictable twists and turns of first love" and visualizes the song in constantly shifting landscapes set in Earth and outer space. Member Riwoo was credited for contributing to the choreography for the song.

== Accolades ==
On South Korean music programs, "Earth, Wind & Fire" achieved first place wins on the April 23 episode of The Show, April 24 episode of Show Champion, and April 26 episode of Music Bank.

== Credits and personnel ==
- Daily – arrangement
- Kako – lyrics, composition
- Likey – arrangement
- Myung Jae-hyun – lyrics, composition
- Pop Time – composition, arrangement
- Taesan – lyrics, composition
- Woonhak – lyrics
- Zico – lyrics, composition

== Charts ==
=== Weekly charts ===
Weekly chart performance for "Earth, Wind & Fire"
| Chart (2024) | Peak position |
|---|---|
| South Korea (Circle) | 85 |

=== Monthly charts ===
Monthly chart performance for "Earth, Wind & Fire"
| Chart (2025) | Position |
|---|---|
| South Korea (Circle) | 120 |

== Japanese version ==
"Earth, Wind & Fire" (Japanese version)
- Maxi single release cover

Single by BoyNextDoor
- Language: Japanese
- B-side: "One and Only" (Japanese ver.); "But Sometimes" (Japanese ver.); "Good Day"
- Released: June 19, 2024
- Genre: Hyperpop
- Length: 2:59
- Label: KOZ; Universal Japan
- Composers: Pop Time; Kako; Jaehyun; Taesan; Zico; Daily; Likey
- Lyricists: Kako; Jaehyun; Kanata Okajima; Taesan; Woonhak; Zico

BoyNextDoor singles chronology
| "Earth, Wind & Fire" (2024) | "Earth, Wind & Fire" (Japanese version) (2024) | "Dangerous" (2024) |

Music video
- Earth, Wind & Fire (Japanese version) on YouTube

A Japanese-language version of "Earth, Wind & Fire" was recorded for BoyNextDoor's debut Japanese maxi single "And,". It was released on June 19, 2024, through Universal Music Japan, with the full single being released on July 10. Japanese songwriter Kanata Okajima provided lyrics for the translated version of the song, with members Jaehyun, Taesan, and Woonhak, and producers Kako and Zico also credited for writing.

=== Background and release ===
The "First love trilogy" of Who!, Why.., and How? earned BoyNextDoor steady commercial success in Japan, culminating with How? debuting at number one on the Oricon Albums Chart. On May 6, 2024, KOZ Entertainment announced that BoyNextDoor would debut in Japan with the release of their debut Japanese maxi single "And,". The maxi single release included Japanese re-recordings of select tracks from the trilogy as well as the Japanese-language song "Good Day". The Japanese version of "Earth, Wind & Fire" fronted the single and was released on June 19, ahead of the single's release. The full single was released on July 10, alongside an alternate music video for the Japanese version of "Earth, Wind & Fire".

=== Promotion ===
BoyNextDoor began promotional activities for "And," on June 19, with a surprise appearance at a listening party held at the Club Quattro in Shibuya, Tokyo, where the song "Good Day" was announced and the Japanese version of "Earth, Wind & Fire" was performed. The band previously opened a photo exhibit on June 14 in collaboration with the retail chain Parco while pre-orders for the physical single began on May 8.

BoyNextDoor accompanied the single's release with a showcase held at the Roppongi Hills Arena in Tokyo. The band appeared in several Japanese programs to promote the single, including the TBS late-night music television program CDTV Live! Live! on July 9; the NTV news program DayDay on July 13 and the TBS music program Music Day the same day.

Concept photos were released in the run-up to the single's release. For the "syōyo" (逍遥; lit. 'walking') concept, the images depict the members aimlessly wandering the streets of Japan as they share personal stories. In the "yakō" (逍遥; lit. 'night train') concept photos, the members are depicted running around in a Japanese train station and entering a convenience store.

=== Commercial performance ===
"And," entered the Daily Single Ranking for the Oricon Chart dated July 10, marking the band's third number one single in the chart. The single cumulatively sold 163,482 copies in two days, double the number sold by How? in 2024.

=== Track listing ===
1. "One and Only" (Japanese version) – 2:48
2. "Earth, Wind & Fire" (Japanese version) – 2:59
3. "But Sometimes" (Japanese version) – 2:54
4. "Good Day" – 2:52

=== Credits and personnel ===
- Daily – composition (track 2), arrangement (track 2–3)
- Jaehyun – lyrics (track 2–3), composition (track 2–3)
- Kako – lyrics (track 2–3), composition (track 2–3), arrangement (track 3)
- Kentz – lyrics (track 4), music (track 4), arrangement (track 4)
- Likey – composition (track 2), arrangement (track 2–3)
- Noizewave – composition (track 4)
- Kanata Okajima – lyrics (track 2)
- Pop Time – composition (track 2–3), arrangement (track 1–3)
- Roho – composition (track 3)
- Taesan – lyrics (track 2–3), music (track 2–3)
- Woonhak – lyrics (track 2–3), music (track 2–3)
- Zico – lyrics (track 1–3), composition (track 1–2)

=== Charts ===
==== Weekly charts ====
Weekly chart performance for And,
| Chart (2024) | Peak position |
|---|---|
| Japan (Oricon) | 2 |
| Japan Combined Singles (Oricon) | 2 |

==== Monthly charts ====
Monthly chart performance for And,
| Chart (2024) | Position |
|---|---|
| Japan (Oricon) | 7 |

=== Certifications ===
Certifications for And,
| Region | Certification | Certified units/sales |
|---|---|---|
| Japan (RIAJ) | Platinum | 250,000^{^} |
^{^} Shipments figures based on certification alone.

== Release history ==
Release history for "Earth, Wind & Fire"
| Region | Date | Format | Version | Label |
|---|---|---|---|---|
| Various | April 15, 2024 | Digital download; streaming | Original | KOZ |
| Various | June 19, 2024 | Digital download; streaming | Japanese | KOZ; Universal Japan |
| Various | February 13, 2026 | Digital download; streaming | "Hotter Than My Ex Ver." | KOZ |
