= Why.. =

- Digital cover

EP by BoyNextDoor
- Released: September 4, 2023
- Length: 16:45
- Language: Korean
- Labels: KOZ; YG Plus

BoyNextDoor chronology
Who! (2023)	Why.. (2023)	How? (2024)

Singles from Why..
- 1. "But Sometimes (뭣 갈아)" Released: September 4, 2023

Why.. is the first extended play (EP) by the South Korean boy band BoyNextDoor, released on September 4, 2023, through KOZ Entertainment, three months following the release of the group's debut single album Who! (2023). The EP consists of six tracks, including the three singles from Who!, and the lead single "But Sometimes (뭣 갈아)".

== Background ==
BoyNextDoor debuted in May 2023 with the release of their debut single album Who!, which was preceded by the release of music videos for the singles "But I Like You", "One and Only" and "Serenade". Upon debut, the songs for both Who! and Why.. have been completed. The physical CDs of the single album contained a 13-second long hidden track which hinted at the group's next release. KOZ Entertainment announced on July 13, 2023, that the group would be releasing new music in September.

== Music and lyrics ==
"The three songs that were previously unveiled depict the boys in first love, while the new tracks capture the emotions they feel after a break-up"

— KOZ Entertainment, via a press release

Why.. has a runtime of 16 minutes and 45 seconds and consists of six tracks. Members Jaehyun, Taesan, and Woonhak, and the label's founder, Zico, participated in writing the songs for the EP.

The songs written for the EP explore the themes of "experiencing a breakup for the first time", serving as the culmination of the three tracks from the group's previous release Who!, which were collectively described as being about the "fresh excitement of boys who fell in love with their first love". In a showcase for the EP ahead of its release, Riwoo explained "We prepared both albums together and we treat them as one [big] album". The songs written for the EP features frank lyrics; Woonhak stated in an interview with The Korea Herald that they "used the daily language and gestures of the members in the lyrics", aiming to have the songs to "sound like talking to a friend".

=== Songs ===
The EP reprises "But I Like You", "One and Only", and "Serenade", as its first three tracks. The fifth track, "But Sometimes", serves as the EP's lead single. Member Taesan described the track as a "breakup song that directly expresses the complex feelings about the first love that ended in vain". Leader Jaehyun added that the track "conveys the complex emotions of your first love that ultimately didn't work out", aiming to capture the "raw emotion" that arises from such situation. The closing track "ABCDLove" discusses the themes surrounding feelings from love to separation and afterwards.

== Release and promotion ==
Why.. was released on September 4, 2023. The release of the EP was accompanied by the television special BoyNextDoor 2Night, which aired on Mnet and M2.

=== Marketing ===
On August 8, 2023, the group released a teaser image depicting a carousel ride in black and white to announce Why.., the group's first extended play. The announcement of the EP was accompanied by the release of a promotion schedule patterned after the ending credits of a movie. Teaser films for the EP were released on August 14. The teasers depict the members' "emotional changes in the start and end of a relationship". The track list of the EP was revealed on August 17. Concept photos depicting the members were released on August 20. A "track spoiler" previewing snippets of the EP's tracks was released online on August 27.

=== Music videos ===
A music video for the lead single, "But Sometimes", was released in conjunction with the album's release. The video depicts the members being unable to "maturely accept the breakup they experience for the first time". The music video sees the neighborhood in the music video for "Serenade" burn to ruin, with the members sinking in water.

== Commercial performance ==
On August 12, 2023, YG Plus, a distributor of the extended play, reported that the pre-orders for the EP exceeded 300,000 pre-orders within three days.

== Track listing ==
Why.. track listing
No.	Title	Lyrics	Music	Arrangement	Length
1.	"But I Like You" (돌아버리겠다)	Pop Time; Kako; Jaehyun; Taesan; Woonhak; Nmore	Pop Time; Kako; Ryo; Jaehyun; Taesan; Woonhak	Pop Time; Kako; Nmore	2:17
2.	"One and Only"	Zico; Pop Time	Zico; Pop Time; Ryo; VILLAIN	Zico; Pop Time	2:48
3.	"Serenade"	Pop Time; Kako; Jaehyun; Taesan; Woonhak	Pop Time; Kako; Daily; Likey; Taesan	Pop Time; Daily; Likey; Kako	3:03
4.	"Crying"	Kako; Jaehyun; Taesan; Woonhak; Sapoh	Pop Time; Kako; Jaehyun; Taesan; Woonhak; Daily; Likey; Ryo	Pop Time; Kako; Daily; Likey	3:03
5.	"But Sometimes" (뭣 갈아)	Kako; Jaehyun; Taesan; Woonhak; Roho; Zico	Pop Time; Kako; Jaehyun; Taesan; Woonhak; Roho; Ryo	Pop Time; Kako; Daily; Likey	2:55
6.	"ABCDLove"	Kako; Jaehyun; Taesan; Woonhak; Ryo	Pop Time; Ryo; Jaehyun; Taesan; Woonhak	Pop Time; Ryo; Kako	2:37
Total length:					16:45

== Charts ==
=== Weekly charts ===
Weekly chart performance for Why..
Chart (2023)	Peak position
French Albums (SNEP)	193
Japanese Albums (Oricon)	3
Japanese Combined Albums (Oricon)	3
Japanese Hot Albums (Billboard Japan)	3
Scottish Albums (Official Charts)	64
South Korean Albums (Circle)	3
UK Albums Sales (OCC)	74
UK Physical Albums (OCC)	65
US Billboard 200	162
US World Albums (Billboard)	3

=== Monthly charts ===
Monthly chart performance for Why..
Chart (2023)	Position
Japanese Albums (Oricon)	8
South Korean Albums (Circle)	3

=== Year-end charts ===
Year-end chart performance for Why..
Chart (2023)	Position
Japanese Albums (Oricon)	85
Japanese Hot Albums (Billboard Japan)	98
South Korean Albums (Circle)	52

== Certifications ==
Certifications for Why..
Region	Certification	Certified units/sales
South Korea (KMCA)	2× Platinum	500,000^{^}
^{^} Shipments figures based on certification alone.

== Release history ==
Release dates and formats for Why..
Region	Date	Format	Version	Label	Ref.
Various	September 4, 2023	CD; digital download; streaming	Dazed; Moody	KOZ; YG Plus	
Various	September 4, 2023	CD; digital download; streaming	Letter	KOZ; YG Plus	
