= Who! (single album) =

- Digital cover

Single album by BoyNextDoor
- Released: May 30, 2023
- Genre: Pop
- Length: 8:08
- Language: Korean
- Label: KOZ; YG Plus
- Producer: Zico; Pop Time; Kako; Nmore; Daily; Likey

BoyNextDoor chronology
| Who! (2023) | Why.. (2023) |

Singles from Who!
- 1. "But I Like You" Released: May 22, 2023; 2. "One and Only" Released: May 25, 2023; 3. "Serenade" Released: May 30, 2023

Who! is the debut single album by South Korean boy band BoyNextDoor. It was released on May 30, 2023, by KOZ Entertainment, a subsidiary of Hybe Corporation. The single album contains three tracks, "But I Like You", "One and Only", and "Serenade", which were all released as singles.

== Background and release ==
On April 12, 2023, KOZ Entertainment announced the formation of their first boy group through the release of clips on YouTube. A few days later on April 16, the group's logo was published on YouTube through the Hybe Label's official channel, revealing their name as BoyNextDoor.

The following month on May 2, KOZ announced that the group would debut with their first single album titled Who!. Then on May 14, KOZ released a series of each member's moving profile on the group's social media platforms.

== Composition ==
As alluded to by their name, BoyNextDoor defined their songs from Who! as "easy listening" and "natural" that the public can sing along to. The single album opens with "But I Like You", a rock-based teen pop song expressing the excitement of falling in love. Members Jaehyun, Taesan, and Woonhak participated in writing and composing the song. "One and Only" describes both the group's uniqueness and determination to confess to their crush with a cheerful rhythm. The song is produced by the label's owner and rapper Zico. The final track "Serenade" has been described as a "lovelorn" song about the group approaching their crush and confessing to them. Member Jaehyun participated in writing lyrics for this track and cites his parents' love story as the inspiration behind the lyrics.

== Promotion ==
Who! was announced on May 22, 2023, that the group would have their own debut show titled "BoyNextDoor Tonight" which aired on Mnet and M2 on the day of the album's release. On June 1, the group held their debut stage on Mnet's M Countdown where they performed "One and Only" and promotions continued through June 10 where the group performed at the 2023 Weverse Con Festival in Seoul.

== Track listing ==
Who! track listing
| No. | Title | Lyrics | Music | Arrangement | Length |
|---|---|---|---|---|---|
| 1. | "But I Like You" (돌아버리겠다) | Pop Time; Kako; Jaeyhun; Taesan; Woonhak; Nmore | Pop Time; Kako; Jaeyhun; Taesan; Woonhak | Pop Time; Kako; Nmore | 2:17 |
| 2. | "One and Only" | Zico; Pop Time | Zico; Pop Time | Zico; Pop Time | 2:48 |
| 3. | "Serenade" | Pop Time; Kako; Daily; Likey; Jaehyun; Taesan; Woonhak | Pop Time; Kako; Daily; Likey | Pop Time; Kako; Daily; Likey | 3:03 |
| Total length: | | | | | 08:08 |

== Charts ==
=== Weekly charts ===
Weekly chart performance for Who!
| Chart (2023) | Peak position |
|---|---|
| Japan (Oricon) | 8 |
| Japan Top Singles Sales (Billboard Japan) | 9 |
| South Korean Albums (Circle) | 5 |

=== Monthly charts ===
Monthly chart performance for Who!
| Chart (2023) | Position |
|---|---|
| Japan (Oricon) | 28 |
| South Korean Albums (Circle) | 13 |

=== Year-end charts ===
Year-end chart performance for Who!
| Chart (2023) | Position |
|---|---|
| South Korean Albums (Circle) | 91 |

== Certifications ==
Certifications for Who!
| Region | Certification | Certified units/sales |
|---|---|---|
| South Korea (KMCA) | Platinum | 250,000^{^} |
^{^} Shipments figures based on certification alone.

== Release history ==
Release dates and formats for Who!
| Region | Date | Format | Label | Ref. |
|---|---|---|---|---|
| Various | May 30, 2023 | CD; digital download; streaming | KOZ; YG Plus | |
