= Melon Music Awards =

South Korean annual music awards

- Current: 2026 Melon Music Awards
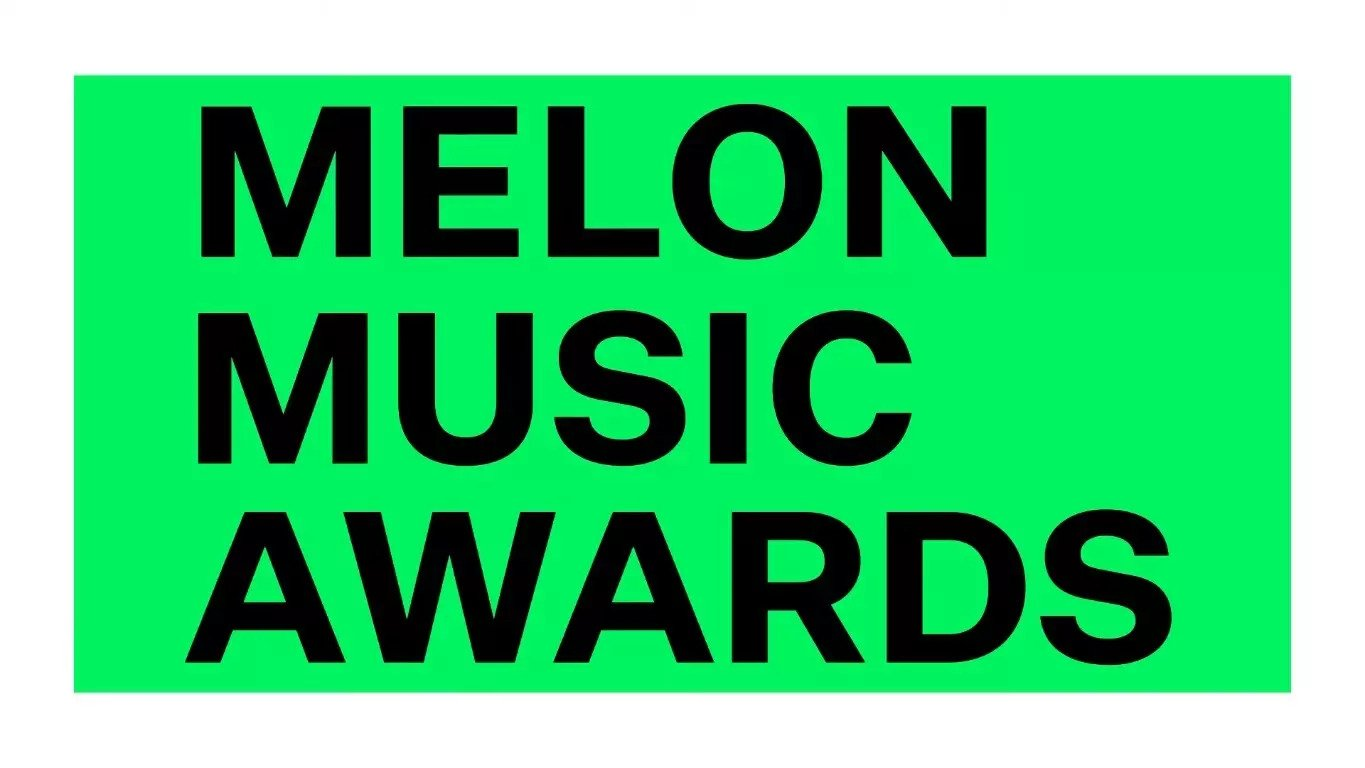
- Awarded for: Exceptional digital performance
- Country: South Korea
- Presented by: Kakao Entertainment
- First award: 2005 (online); December 16, 2009; 16 years ago (live)
- Website: www.melon.com/mma/index.htm

Television/radio coverage
- Network: K-Star (2009); MBC Plus channels (2010–2017); JTBC Plus channels (2018); KakaoTV (2017–present); Melon (2019–present); KakaoTalk (2020–present)

The Melon Music Awards (Korean: 멜론 뮤직어워드) is a major music awards show that is held annually by Kakao Entertainment (a Kakao company) through its online music store Melon. The event was initially a fan-voted award conducted entirely online from 2005 through 2008, and has been officially held offline in Seoul since 2009.

The award show uses digital data from the Melon music platform, online voting and judges' evaluation—to base its awards on artists who have performed exceptional during the year.

== History ==
The awards show underwent a logo rebranding starting with the 2019 edition. The 2020 Melon Music Awards was held for 4 days from December 2 to 5, dubbed as "MMA Week," and was broadcast online due to government restrictions imposed by the ongoing COVID-19 pandemic.

== Host venues ==
Year	Date	Venue	City	Ref.
2009	December 16, 2009	Olympic Hall	Seoul	
2010	December 15, 2010	Kyung Hee University Hall of Peace	Seoul	
2011	November 24, 2011	Olympic Gymnastics Arena	Seoul	
2012	December 14, 2012	Olympic Gymnastics Arena	Seoul	
2013	November 14, 2013	Olympic Gymnastics Arena	Seoul	
2014	November 13, 2014	Olympic Gymnastics Arena	Seoul	
2015	November 7, 2015	Olympic Gymnastics Arena	Seoul	
2016	November 19, 2016	Gocheok Sky Dome	Seoul	
2017	December 2, 2017	Gocheok Sky Dome	Seoul	
2018	December 1, 2018	Gocheok Sky Dome	Seoul	
2019	November 30, 2019	Gocheok Sky Dome	Seoul	
2020	December 2–5, 2020	Virtual event	—N/a	
2021	December 4, 2021	Virtual event	—N/a	
2022	November 26, 2022	Gocheok Sky Dome	Seoul	
2023	December 2, 2023	Inspire Arena	Incheon	
2024	November 30, 2024	Inspire Arena	Incheon	
2025	December 20, 2025	Gocheok Sky Dome	Seoul	
2026	November 14–15, 2026	Gocheok Sky Dome	Seoul	

== Judging criteria ==
Division	Online Voting	Digital Sales	Judge Score
Grand prizes^{[a]}	20%	60%	20%
Best New Artist	20%	60%	20%
Main prizes^{[b]}	20%	80%	—
Genre Awards^{[c]}	30%	40%	30%
Popularity Awards^{[d]}	60%	40%	—
Special Awards^{[e]}	—	—	100%
^{^[a]} Artist of the Year, Album of the Year, Song of the Year; ^{^[b]} Top 10 Artist, Millions Top 10 Album; ^{^[c]} Rap/Hip Hop, Ballad, R&B, Rock, OST, Trot, Pop, Dance, Folk/Blues, Indie; ^{^[d]} Netizen's Choice Award, Hot Trend Award; ^{^[e]} Record of The Year, Music Video Award, Song Writer Award, MBC Music Star Award, Performing Arts Award, Global Star Award, QQ Asia Artist Award, Hall of Fame Award, Kakao Hot Star Award

== Grand prizes ==
The five grand prizes (known as daesangs):

=== Record of the Year ===
Year	Winner
2018	Wanna One
2019	BTS
2020	-
2021	aespa
2022	BTS
2023	NCT Dream
2024	(G)I-dle
2025	Jennie
2026	CORTIS

=== Global K-Artist of the Year ===
Year	Winner
2026	Aespa

== Main prizes ==
=== Top 10 Artist Award ===
Year	Winners									
2009	2PM	Girls' Generation	Kara	K.Will	G-Dragon	8eight	Super Junior	2NE1	Brown Eyed Girls	Davichi
2010	2PM	Girls' Generation	2AM	IU	DJ DOC	CNBLUE	Lee Seung-gi	2NE1	T-ara	4Men
2011	f(x)	Secret	Beast	IU	Big Bang	Sistar	Super Junior	2NE1	Leessang	Lena Park
2012	Psy	Busker Busker	Beast	IU	Big Bang	Sistar	Infinite	2NE1	T-ara	Huh Gak
2013	Shinee	Busker Busker	Beast	IU	G-Dragon	Sistar	Exo	Ailee	Dynamic Duo	Davichi
2014	g.o.d	Winner	Beast	IU	Taeyang	Sistar	Exo	2NE1	Girl's Day	AKMU
2015	Shinee	Girls' Generation	Hyukoh	Apink	Big Bang	Sistar	Exo	San E	Zion.T	Toy
2016	Bewhy	Taeyeon	BTS	GFriend	Mamamoo	Zico	Exo	Twice	Red Velvet	AKMU
2017	Heize	Winner	BTS	IU	Big Bang	Wanna One	Exo	Twice	Red Velvet	Bolbbalgan4
2018	iKon	BtoB	BTS	Apink	Mamamoo	Wanna One	Exo	Twice	Blackpink	Bolbbalgan4
2019	Heize	Taeyeon	BTS	Chungha	Mamamoo	MC the Max	Exo	Jannabi	Jang Beom-june	Bolbbalgan4
2020	Kim Ho-joong	Baek Ye-rin	BTS	IU	Oh My Girl	Zico	Baekhyun	Lim Young-woong	Blackpink	Iz*One
2021	Heize	Lee Mu-jin	BTS	IU	Lil Boi	NCT Dream	Aespa	Lim Young-woong	Ash Island	AKMU
2022	(G)I-dle	NewJeans	BTS	IU	MeloMance	NCT Dream	Be'O	Lim Young-woong	Ive	Seventeen
2023	(G)I-dle	NewJeans	BTS	Le Sserafim	Jung Kook	NCT Dream	Aespa	Lim Young-woong	Ive	Seventeen
2024	(G)I-dle	NewJeans	Riize	IU	Jung Kook	Plave	Aespa	Day6	TWS	Seventeen
2025	Rosé	BoyNextDoor	Riize	Jennie	G-Dragon	Plave	Aespa	Lim Young-woong	Ive	NCT Wish
2026	AKMU	Cortis	BTS	Hearts2Hearts	I.O.I	Illit	Ive	KiiiKiii	NCT Wish	Plave

=== Millions Top 10 Album Award ===
Year	Winners									
2023	(G)I-dle – I Feel	Aespa – My World	BSS – Second Wind	Ive – I've Ive	Jung Kook – "Seven" (feat. Latto)	Le Sserafim – Unforgiven	Lim Young-woong – "Do or Die"	NCT Dream – ISTJ	NewJeans – Get Up	Seventeen – FML
2024	Taeyeon – To. X	Aespa – Armageddon	Plave – Asterum 134-1	Ive – Ive Switch	Jung Kook – Golden	IU – The Winning	Lim Young-woong – "Warmth"	Riize – Riizing	NewJeans – How Sweet	Day6 – Band Aid
2025	Jennie – Ruby	Rosé – Rosie	Plave – "Caligo Pt. 1"	Ive – Ive Empathy	G-Dragon – Übermensch	IU – A Flower Bookmark 3	Lim Young-woong – "Im Hero 2"	Riize – Odyssey	BoyNextDoor – No Genre	Seventeen – Happy Burstday

=== Global Top 10 ===
Year	Winners									
2026	Riize	BTS	Rescene	G-Dragon	Aespa	Hearts2Hearts	Cortis	Illit	NCT Wish	Ive

== Genre Awards ==
=== Best Rap/Hip Hop ===
Year	Winner	Song
2010	Supreme Team	"Dang Dang Dang"
2011	GD & TOP	"Oh Yeah" (feat. Park Bom)
2012	Dynamic Duo	"Without You"
2013	Baechigi	"Shower of Tears" (feat. Ailee)
2014	San E & Raina	"A Midsummer Night's Sweetness"
2015	Mad Clown	"Fire" (feat. Jinsil)
2016	Zico	"Eureka" (feat. Zion.T)
2017	Dynamic Duo & Chen	"Nosedive"
2018	BTS	"Fake Love"
2019	Epik High	"Lovedrunk" (feat. Crush)
2020	Yumdda, Paloalto, The Quiett, Deepflow, Simon Dominic	"I'mma Do" (feat. Woo Won-jae, Keem Hyo-eun, Nucksal, Huckleberry P)

=== Best Ballad ===
Year	Winner	Song
2010	Gummy	"Because You're A Man"
2011	Kim Bum-soo	"Please"
2012	K.Will	"Please Don't"
2013	Huh Gak	"Monodrama" (with Yoo Seung-woo)
2013	K.Will	"Love Blossom"
2014	M.C the Max	"Wind That Blows"
2015	Baek Ah Yeon	"Shouldn't Have" (feat. Young K)
2016	Jung Eun-ji	"Hopefully Sky"
2016	Im Chang-jung	"The Love I Committed"
2017	Yoon Jong-shin	"Like It"
2018	Roy Kim	"Only Then"
2019	Taeyeon	"Four Seasons"
2020	Davichi	"Dear"

=== Best R&B ===
Year	Winner	Song
2014	Fly to the Sky	"You You You"
2015	Naul	"Living in the Same Time"
2016	Baekhyun & Suzy	"Dream"
2017	Suran	"Wine"
2018	IU	"Bbibbi"
2019	Heize	"We Don't Talk Together"
2020	Baek Ye-rin	"Square (2017)"

=== Best Rock ===
Year	Winner	Song
2010	Hot Potato	"Confession"
2011	CNBLUE	"Intuition"
2012	Nell	"The Day Before"
2013	Cho Yong-pil	"Bounce"
2014	CNBLUE	"Can't Stop"
2015	Kim Sunggyu	"The Answer"
2016	Ha Hyun-woo	"Don't Cry"
2017	Kim Hee-chul & Min Kyung-hoon	"Sweet Dream"
2018	Kim Hee-chul & Min Kyung-hoon	"Falling Blossoms"
2019	N.Flying	"Rooftop"
2020	IU	"Eight" (feat. Suga)

=== Best Trot ===
Year	Winner	Song
2010	Jang Yoon-jeong	"Come On"
2015	Hong Jin Young	"Love Wifi"
2016	Hong Jin Young	"Thumbs Up"
2017	Hong Jin Young & Kim Young Chul	"Ring Ring (Composer ver.)"
2018	Hong Jin Young	"Goodbye"
2019	Hong Jin Young	"Love Tonight"
2020	Lim Young-woong	"Trust in Me"

=== Best Pop ===
Year	Winner	Song
2012	Maroon 5	"Payphone" (feat. Wiz Khalifa)
2013	Bruno Mars	"Young Girls"
2015	Mark Ronson	"Uptown Funk" (feat. Bruno Mars)
2016	Justin Bieber	"Love Yourself"
2017	Ed Sheeran	"Shape of You"
2018	Camila Cabello	"Havana" (feat. Young Thug)
2019	Billie Eilish	"Bad Guy"
2020	Sam Smith	"To Die For"
2022	Charlie Puth	"That's Hilarious"
2023	Charlie Puth	"That's Not How This Works" (feat. Dan + Shay)
2024	Benson Boone	"Beautiful Things"
2025	Ed Sheran	"Azizam"
2026	Bruno Mars	"Risk It All"

=== Best Dance ===
Year	Winner		Song
2014	Male	Block B	"Her"
2014	Female	Apink	"Mr. Chu"
2015	Male	BTS	"I Need U"
2015	Female	Red Velvet	"Ice Cream Cake"
2016	Male	Exo	"Monster"
2016	Female	GFriend	"Rough"
2017	Male	Exo	"Ko Ko Bop"
2017	Female	Twice	"Knock Knock"
2018	Male	Wanna One	"Boomerang"
2018	Female	Blackpink	"Ddu-Du Ddu-Du"
2019	Male	BTS	"Boy with Luv" (feat. Halsey)
2019	Female	Chungha	"Gotta Go"
2020	Male	BTS	"Dynamite"
2020	Female	Blackpink	"How You Like That"

=== Best Folk/Blues ===
Year	Winner	Song
2014	Akdong Musician	"200%"
2015	10cm	"Sseudam Sseudam"
2016	10cm	"What The Spring??"
2017	Jung Eun-ji	"The Spring"
2018	Hong Jin-young	"Good Bye"

=== Best Indie ===
Year	Winner	Song
2014	Standing Egg	"Lean on Me" (feat. Park Se-young)
2015	Standing Egg	"The Sunlight Hurts" (feat. Wheein & Obroject Yundak)
2016	Bolbbalgan4	"Galaxy"
2017	MeloMance	"Gift"
2018	MeloMance	"Fairy Tale"
2019	MeloMance	"You&I"
2020	Bolbbalgan4	"Leo" (feat. Baekhyun)

=== Best OST ===
Year	Winner	Song	Drama/TV Show/Film
2009	Future Liger	"Let's Dance"	Infinite Challenge
2010	Lee Seung-gi	"Losing My Mind"	My Girlfriend Is a Nine-Tailed Fox
2011	Sunny Hill	"Pit-a-Pat"	The Greatest Love
2012	Seo In-guk & Jung Eun-ji	"All For You"	Reply 1997
2013	Yoon Mi-rae	"Touch Love"	Master's Sun
2014	Lyn	"My Destiny"	My Love from the Star
2015	Loco & Yuju of GFriend	"Spring is Gone By Chance"	A Girl Who Sees Smells
2016	Yoon Mi-rae	"Always"	Descendants of the Sun
2017	Ailee	"I Will Go to You Like the First Snow"	Goblin
2018	Paul Kim	"Every Day, Every Moment"	Should We Kiss First?
2019	Gummy	"Remember Me"	Hotel del Luna
2020	Jo Jung-suk	"Aloha"	Hospital Playlist
2021	Lee Mu-jin	"Rain and You"	Hospital Playlist 2
2022	MeloMance	"Love, Maybe"	Business Proposal
2023	Lim Jae-hyun	"Heaven"	It Was Spring
2024	Eclipse (Byeon Woo-Seok)	"Sudden Shower"	Lovely Runner
2025	Huntrix (Ejae, Audrey Nuna, and Rei Ami) & KPop Demon Hunters Cast	"Golden"	KPop Demon Hunters
2026	Kim Minseok	"love language"	"Can This Love Be Translated?"

=== Best Performance ===
Year	Winner	
2020	Male	Monsta X
2021	Male	The Boyz
2022	Male	Tomorrow X Together
2022	Female	Le Sserafim
2023	Male	Seventeen
2023	Female	Aespa
2024	Male	BoyNextDoor
2024	Female	Aespa
2025	Male	Riize
2025	Female	Illit
2026	Male	Riize
2026	Male	Ateez
2026	Female	KiiiKiii
2026	Female	Illit

== Popularity awards ==
=== Netizen's Choice Award ===
Year	Winner	Song
2010	Super Junior	"Bonamana"
2011	Super Junior	"Mr. Simple"
2012	Beast	"Midnight"
2013	Exo	"Growl"
2014	Beast	"Good Luck"
2015	Big Bang	"Bang Bang Bang"
2016	Exo	"Monster"
2017	Exo	"Ko Ko Bop"
2018	BTS	"Idol"
2019	BTS	"Boy with Luv"
2020	BTS	"Dynamite"
2021	BTS	"Butter"
2022	Lim Young-woong	"If We Ever Meet Again"

=== Hot Trend Award ===
Year	Winner	Work	Topic
2010	Girls' Generation	"Hoot"	Music
2011	Infinite Challenge	"West Coast Expressway Music Festival"	Variety Series
2012	Trouble Maker	"Trouble Maker"	Collaboration
2013	Crayon Pop	"Bar Bar Bar"	Music
2013	Rose Motel	"Longtime Lovers"	Music
2014	Soyou & Junggigo	"Some"	Collaboration
2015	Infinite Challenge	"Yeongdong Expressway Music Festival"	Variety Series
2016	Zico	"I Am You, You Are Me"	Radio Star
2017	Suran & Suga	"Wine"	Singer and Producer
2018	Loco & Hwasa	"Don't"	Collaboration
2019	AB6IX	—	Produce 101 Alumni
2020	Mr. Trot 6	—	Reality Show
2021	Brave Girls	"Rollin'"	Music
2022	Le Sserafim	"Fearless"	Music
2023	Jung Kook	"Seven"	Soloist & Unit
2024	QWER	—	Music
2025	Woodz	"Drowning"	Music
2026	Ateez	"Bad"	Music
2026	Rescene	"runaway"	Music

== Special awards ==
=== Music Video Award ===
Year	Winner	Music Video
2010	Hwang Soo-ah	Ga-in's "Irreversible"
2011	Cha Eun-taek	T-ara's "Roly-Poly"
2012	Cho Soo-hyun	Psy's "Gangnam Style"
2013	Lee Gi-baek (Tiger Cave Studio)	Beast's "Shadow"
2014	Won Tae-yeon (LOEN Entertainment)	Melody Day's "Another Parting"
2015	Naive Creative Production	Park Jin-young's "Who's Your Mama?" (feat. Jessi)
2016	Shin Hee-won	Red Velvet's "Russian Roulette"
2017	Choi Yong-su (Lumpens)	BTS' "DNA"
2018	Ko Yoo-jeong (Lumpens)	GFriend's "Time for the Moon Night"
2019	VM Project Architecture	Kang Daniel's "What Are You Up To"
2021	Yong Seok Choi, Guzza (Lumpens)	TXT's "0X1=Lovesong (I Know I Love You)" (feat. Seori)
2022	Samson (Highqualityfish)	(G)I-dle's "Tomboy"
2023	Naive Creative Production	STAYC's "Bubble"
2024	Yoon Seung-rim, Jang Dong-ju (Rigend Film)	Ive's "Heya"
2025	Jinooya Makes	KiiiKiii's "I Do Me"
2026	Bang Jaeyeob (BANGJAEYEOBFILM)	Ive's "Bang Bang"

=== Songwriter Award ===
Year	Winner	Song
2009	Hitman Bang	8eight's "Without A Heart" & "Goodbye My Love"
2010	Lee Min-soo & Kim Eana	IU and Im Seulong's "Nagging"
2011	Jeon Hye-sung	Davichi's "Don't Say Goodbye", Baek Ji-young's "That Woman"
2012	Duble Sidekick	Sistar's "Loving U", Baek Ji-young's "Voice", "Good Boy"
2013	Shinsadong Tiger	Ailee's "U&I", Apink's "NoNoNo", Trouble Maker's "Now"
2014	Kim Do-hoon	Soyou & Junggigo's "Some", Mad Clown's "Without You", Ailee's "Don't Touch Me"
2015	Teddy Park	BigBang's "Loser", "Bae Bae", "Bang Bang Bang", "We Like 2 Party", "Sober", "Zutter" (GD & TOP), and "Let's Not Fall In Love"
2016	Hitman Bang	BTS' "Fire", "Save Me", and "Blood Sweat & Tears"
2017	IU	IU's "Through the Night", "Can't Love You Anymore", "Palette", and "Ending Scene"
2018	B.I	iKon's "Love Scenario", "Killing Me", and "Goodbye Road"
2019	Pdogg	BTS' "Boy with Luv", "Dionysus", "Mikrokosmos", "Make It Right", and TXT's "Angel or Devil"
2020	Young Tak	Lee Daewon's "Champion", Jang Minho's "Read and Ignored", Jung Dongwon and Nam Seungmin's "Hit It Off", Young & Wild's "Thirsty", Ko Jaegeun's "Love Cowboy", Sungwonee's "Because of Money", and Han Leejae's "Knock Knock Knock"
2021	IU	IU's "Strawberry Moon", "Lilac", "Celebrity", "Coin", "My Sea" and "Hi Spring Bye"
2022	Jeon So-yeon	(G)I-dle's "Tomboy", "My Bag" and "Nxde"
2023	Ryan S. Jhun	Ive's "I Am", "Kitsch", "I Want", "Off the Record", "Baddie" & "Either Way", Monsta X's "Beautiful Liar", Hwang Min-hyun's "Hidden Side", Queendom Puzzle's "SNAP", "Bad Blood" & "I Do", Fromis_9's "#menow", Ren's "Ready to Move", Oh My Girl's "Summer Comes", Infinite's "New Emotion", Cignature's "Smooth Sailing", Weeekly's "Good Day (Special Daileee)", D.O's "I Do", Just B's "Medusa", Viviz's "Untie" & Enhypen's "Orange Flower (You Complete Me)"
2024	Jeon So-yeon	(G)I-dle's "Super Lady", "Fate", "Wife" and "Klaxon", QWER's "My Name Is Malgeum"
2025	G-Dragon	G-Dragon's "Home Sweet Home", "Power" and "Too Bad"
2026	Lee Chan-hyuk (AKMU)	AKMU's "Paradise of Rumours", "Joy, Sorry, A Beautiful Heart", "Spring Colors", "Paid With Bugs", "Sunshine Bless You", "Tent", "Young and Married", "The Right Person", "Graceful Breakfast", "Festival of Refugees" and "Stains", BABO's "Wah", "Beautiful Mannequin", "Sexy Dance", "Baboo", "Thriller", "Born King" & "B-Day Party"

=== Best Performance Director ===
Year	Winner
2020	Son Seung-duk
2021	Son Seung-duk

=== Best Music Style ===
Year	Winner
2021	Homies
2022	Big Naughty
2023	Silica Gel
2024	Bibi & Lee Young-ji
2025	10cm & AllDay Project
2026	I.O.I

=== Best Solo ===
Year	Winner	
2021	Male	Lim Young-woong
2021	Female	IU
2022	Male	Lim Young-woong
2022	Female	IU
2023	Male	Jung Kook
2023	Female	Lee Young-ji
2024	Male	Jung Kook
2024	Female	IU
2025	Male	G-Dragon
2025	Female	Rosé
2026	Male	Lim Young-woong
2026	Female	Choi Ye-na

=== Best Group ===
Year	Winner	
2021	Male	BTS
2021	Female	Aespa
2022	Male	BTS
2022	Female	Ive
2023	Male	NCT Dream
2023	Female	NewJeans
2024	Male	Riize
2024	Female	aespa
2025	Male	Boynextdoor
2025	Female	Ive
2026	Male	BTS
2026	Female	Ive

=== Best Collaboration ===
Year	Winner	Song
2021	Coldplay & BTS	"My Universe"
2022	10cm & Big Naughty	"Beyond Love"
2023	Jung Kook & Latto	"Seven"

=== Global Artist Award ===
Year	Winner	Song
2011	Girls' Generation	"The Boys"
2012	Psy	"Gangnam Style"
2013	Psy	"Gentleman"
2017	BTS	"DNA"
2018	BTS	"Fake Love"
2022	Monsta X	"Love"
2023	aespa	—
2024	Ateez	—
2024	Ive	—
2025	aespa	—

=== Global Rising Artist ===
Year	Winner	Song
2021	Enhypen	"Drunk Dazed"
2022	STAYC	"Beautiful Monster"
2023	Boynextdoor	"But Sometimes"
2024	Riize	"Impossible"
2025	IDID	—
2026	Tuide	And2ble

=== Kakao Hot Star Award ===
Year	Winner
2016	Exo
2017	Wanna One
2018	BTS
2019	BTS

=== Stage of the Year ===
Year	Winner
2017	Park Hyo Shin
2018	Lee Sun-hee
2019	Seventeen
2022	IU - The Golden Hour
2023	Shinee – Shinee World VI: Perfect Illumination
2024	IU – IU HEREH World Tour
2025	Aespa – Synk: Aexis Line
2026	BTS – ARIRANG World Tour

=== 1theK Performance Award ===
Year	Winner
2015	Monsta X
2017	GFriend
2018	Momoland
2019	The Boyz

=== 1theK Original Contents ===
Year	Winner
2020	The Boyz
2021	STAYC

=== 1theK Global Icon ===
Year	Winner
2022	Enhypen
2023	Kiss of Life
2024	TripleS
2025	KiiiKiii
2026	hrtz.wav

== Other awards ==
=== 2009 ===
- Star: TVXQ
- Mania: TVXQ - "Mirotic"
- Current Stream: Kim Tae-woo – "Love Rain"
- Smart Radio: Girls' Generation
- Odyssey: Girls' Generation – "Gee"
- Mobile Music: Girls' Generation
- Sudden Rise: Leessang
- Y-STAR Live: Lee Seung-chul

=== 2010 ===
- Best Dressed Singer: Girls' Generation
- Best MBC Radio Singer: Jung Yeop – "Without You"

=== 2016 ===
- Hall of Fame Award: Sechs Kies
- Tencent-QQ Music Asia Star Award: iKon

=== 2020 ===
- Best Drum: Shin Seok Cheol
- Best Bass: Choi Hoon
- Best Synthesizer: Hong So Jin
- Best Guitar: Juk Jae
- Best Chorus: Kim Hyun Ah

=== 2021 ===
- Project Music: MSG Wannabe M.O.M
- Best Session Instrumental Award: Kim Dong-min (Guitarist), Go Tae-yeong (Bassist), Gureum (Keyboardist)
- Legendary Performance: BTS – "IDOL"

=== 2022 ===
- Project Music Award: WSG Wannabe
- KakaoBank Everyone's Star: BTS

=== 2023 ===
- Kakao Favorite Star: BTS
- J-Pop Favorite Artist: imase
- Best Producer: Han Sung-soo (Pledis Entertainment)

=== 2024 ===
- Kakao Bank Everyone's Star: Riize
- J-Pop Favorite Artist: Yoasobi
- Track Zero Choice: Hyukoh & Sunset Rollercoaster - "Young Man"
- Best Producer: Seo Hyun-joo (Starship Entertainment)

=== 2025 ===
- Kakao Bank Everyone's Star: NCT Wish
- J-Pop Favorite Artist: Kenshi Yonezu
- Japan Favorite Artist by U-Next: BoyNextDoor
- Track Zero Choice: Hanroro - "Goodbye, My Summer"
- Best Producer: Zico (KOZ Entertainment)
- Berriz Global Fan's Choice: Hearts2Hearts

=== 2026 ===
- Kakao Bank Everyone's Star: Rescene
- J-Pop Favorite Artist: Hana
- Best Producer: Nicole Hyunjung Kim (BigHit Music)
- Global Impact Artist: TWS; Hearts2Hearts; Illit; NCT Wish

== Discontinued awards ==
See Awards

Best Electronic

Year	Winner	Song
2014	2NE1	"Come Back Home"

MBC Music Star Award

Year	Winner
2010	Miss A
2011	Baek Ji-young
2012	Shindong & Kim Shin-young
2013	f(x)
2014	Ladies' Code
2015	EXID
2016	Seventeen
2017	Hyuna

Performing Arts Award

Year	Winner	Song
2010	Psy	"Right Now"
2011	Lee Seung-hwan	"Super Hero"
2013	Shin Seung-hun	—

== Most wins ==
=== Most grand prizes awarded ===
This list includes Artist of the Year, Album of the Year, Song of the Year, and Record of the Year Award.

Awards	Artist
17	BTS
5	IU aespa
4	Exo
4	G-Dragon
3	Girls' Generation
3	Ive
2	Big Bang
2	2NE1
2	NewJeans
2	Busker Busker
2	Beast
2	Lim Young-woong

=== Most awarded overall ===
Awards	Artist
46	BTS
26	IU
19	aespa
17	Exo
14	G-Dragon
13	Ive Lim Young-woong
12	Girls' Generation
9	2NE1
9	NewJeans
9	Beast
7	Big Bang Jung Kook

== Broadcasting ==
=== South Korea ===
- The 1st Melon Music Awards ceremony was broadcast through CU Media's y-star, Dramax and Comedy TV channels. Internet partners include Melon, Nate (then a sister brand), GOMTV and Afreeca TV (2009-2010).
- In 2010, LOEN Entertainment partnered with MBC Plus Media, and the latter transmitted the awards night through MBC every1, MBC Dramanet (from 2010 to 2011 and 2013), MBC Game (now defunct) and MBC Life (now defunct). When MBC Music was launched in 2012, it shared the honor of being the flagship station of MMA with MBC every1. MBC QueeN joined in 2013.
- Daum was the local internet partner in 2013. One year later, it merged with LOEN's incumbent parent company Kakao.
- In 2018, the awards show was broadcast on JTBC2, JTBC4, 1theK, and KakaoTV as part of their partnership with JTBC Plus Media.

=== Worldwide ===
- Since 2011, Alphabet Inc.'s YouTube (specifically the 1theK (formerly LOEN Music) channel) is the internet broadcast partner of Melon Music Awards. Microsoft's Zune was the first internet broadcast partner (2009).

=== China ===
- Tencent, via its QQ Music and QQ Live services, owns the broadcast rights since 2016.

=== Japan ===
- The Sony Music Japan-owned Music On! TV acquired the local broadcast rights in 2015, making Melon Music Awards the second Korean music awarding event that it broadcasts (the first being Mnet Asian Music Awards).

=== Thailand ===
- Joox, another Tencent-owned music service, together with its sister property Sanook.com, brought Melon Music Awards to its users in Thailand in 2016 and 2017.

=== Taiwan ===
- Streaming rights is handled by Taiwan Mobile's MyMusic service.
