= List of awards and nominations received by G-Dragon =

G-Dragon awards and nominations
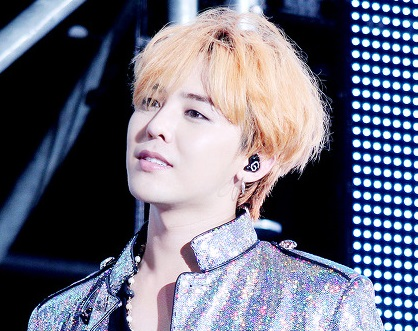
- G-Dragon at the Infinite Challenge Music Festival in 2015
Awards and nominations
Award	Wins	Nominations
Anugerah Bintang Popular Berita Harian	0	1
Asia Artist Awards	1	2
Asian Pop Music Awards	6	12
Brand Customer Loyalty Awards	1	1
Brand of the Year Awards	2	2
China Year End Awards	6	8
Cyworld Digital Music Awards	4	4
DAP Awards	1	1
European K-pop So-Loved Awards	1	1
Fundex Awards	2	2
Fuse TV	1	1
Gaon Chart Music Awards	1	1
Golden Disc Awards	5	12
Hanteo Music Awards	2	17
Hito Music Awards	1	1
ICT Awards Korea	1	1
InStyle Star Icon Awards	1	1
iMBC Awards	1	2
International Dance Music Awards	0	1
JTBC Awards	1	1
K-World Dream Awards	1	1
Korea Grand Music Awards	0	6
Korean Hip-Hop Awards	1	1
Korean Music Awards	3	6
KOMCA Grand Prize	1	1
MBC Entertainment Awards	2	2
Melon Music Awards	14	26
Music Awards Japan	1	1
Mnet Asian Music Awards	12	25
MTV Iggy	1	1
MTV Video Music Awards Japan	1	1
Philippine K-pop Awards	1	1
QQ Music Awards	3	3
QQ Music Dianfeng Awards	3	3
Rhythmer Awards	1	1
RTHK International Pop Poll Awards	2	3
SBS MTV Best of the Best	1	2
Seoul Music Awards	2	10
Singapore Entertainment Awards	0	2
Style Icon Awards	4	5
Tencent Music Year End Awards	21	21
TMElive International Music Awards	1	1
V Chart Awards	1	2
World Music Awards	2	5
Youku Tudou Young Choice Awards	1	1
YouTube Music Awards	1	1
Other accolades	30	30

Totals (Note: Certain award groups do not simply award one winner. They acknowledge several different recipients, have runners-up, and have third place. Since this is a specific recognition and is different from losing an award, runner-up mentions are considered wins in this award tally. For simplification and to avoid errors, each award in this list has been presumed to have had a prior nomination.)
- Wins: 150
- Nominations: 236

G-Dragon is a South Korean rapper, singer, songwriter, record producer, entrepreneur, and fashion designer.He leader of South Korean boy band Big Bang formed by YG Entertainment in 2006. He has won numerous awards and recognitions for his work in both the music and fashion industry.

G-Dragon won Album of the Year at both the 2009 Mnet Asian Music Awards and Melon Music Awards for his debut studio album Heartbreaker. In 2013, he won Record of the Year at the Seoul Music Awards and Digital Bonsang at the Golden Disc Awards for his first extended play One of a Kind, and also Best Rap/Hip-hop Song at the Korean Music Awards for his single of the same name. At the 2013 Mnet Asian Music Awards, he was the most awarded and nominated act winning four out of six nominations including Artist of the Year, Best Male Artist, and Best Music Video.

G-Dragon won the Style Icon of the Year Award in 2013, and was also honored with the same award in 2016. In 2015, he was chosen by GQ Korea as their Man of the Year. In 2016, he was recognised by the Ministry of Culture, Sports and Tourism for his achievements in the entertainment industry and given the Korean Prime Minister Recognition Award. Forbes listed him as the Most Influential Person Under 30 in Asia's Entertainment and Sports in 2016.

Following his 7 year hiatus and comeback in the previous year at the 2024 Mnet Asian Music Awards and the release of his third full Album on February 25, 2025. At the 2025 Mnet Asian Music Awards he was, alongside Rosé and Aespa, the most awarded act, winning Artist of the Year, Best Male Artist, Best Male Dance Performance and MAMA Award for Fans' Choice of the Year.

At the 2025 Melon Music Awards he became the most awarded act, winning a total of 7 awards, including 3 Daesangs, Artist of the Year (Daesang), Album of the Year (Daesang), Song of the Year (Daesang), Best Male Solo, Top 10 Artist, Millions Top 10 and Best Songwriter. This feat marks the "most dominant individual performance" at the awards in recent memory.

== Awards and nominations ==
Name of the award ceremony, year presented, category, nominee(s) of the award, and the result of the nomination
Award ceremony	Year	Category	Nominee(s)/work(s)	Result	Ref.
Anugerah Bintang Popular Berita Harian	2019	Korean Popular Artist	G-Dragon	Nominated	
Asia Artist Awards	2025	Legendary Male Solo	G-Dragon	Won	
Asia Artist Awards	2026	Popularity Award – Solo (Male)	G-Dragon	Pending	
Asian Pop Music Awards (Note: Hosted by the Hong Kong Asia Pacific International Group and Sunway Records, the Asian Pop Music Awards bases its winners on "Asian Pop Music Chart" which opened in September 2019.)	2024	Song of the Year (Overseas)	"Power"	Won	
Asian Pop Music Awards	2024	Top 20 Songs (Overseas)	"Power"	Won	
Asian Pop Music Awards	2025	Best Music Video	"Too Bad"	Nominated	
Asian Pop Music Awards	2025	Best Collaboration	"Too Bad"	Nominated	
Asian Pop Music Awards	2025	Top 10 Songs of the Year	"Drama"	Won	
Asian Pop Music Awards	2025	Best Album of the Year	Übermensch	Won	
Asian Pop Music Awards	2025	Top 20 Albums of the Year	Übermensch	Won	
Asian Pop Music Awards	2025	Best Producer	G-Dragon	Won	
Asian Pop Music Awards	2025	Best Composer	G-Dragon	Nominated	
Asian Pop Music Awards	2025	Best Male Artist	G-Dragon	Nominated	
Asian Pop Music Awards	2025	Best Lyricist	G-Dragon	Nominated	
Asian Pop Music Awards	2025	People's Choice Award	G-Dragon	Nominated	
Brand Customer Loyalty Awards	2025	Male Solo Singer	G-Dragon	Won	
Brand of the Year Awards	2025	Best Male Idol (Indonesia)	G-Dragon	Won	
Brand of the Year Awards	2025	Best Male Idol (Vietnam)	G-Dragon	Won	
China Year End Awards	2024	Best Selling Male Solo Single	Power	Won	
China Year End Awards	2024	Best Selling International Single	Power	Nominated	
China Year End Awards	2024	Best Selling Single	Power	Nominated	
China Year End Awards	2024	Best Selling Artist - Singles	G-Dragon	Won	
China Year End Awards	2024	Best Selling Single	Home Sweet Home	Won	
China Year End Awards	2024	Best Selling International Single	Home Sweet Home	Won	
China Year End Awards	2024	Best Selling Kpop Single	Home Sweet Home	Won	
China Year End Awards	2024	Best Selling Kpop Collaboration	Home Sweet Home	Won	
Cyworld Digital Music Awards	2009	Song of the Month (September)	"Heartbreaker"	Won	
Cyworld Digital Music Awards	2009	Ting's Choice Award	"Heartbreaker"	Won	
Cyworld Digital Music Awards	2009	Bonsang Award	"Heartbreaker"	Won	
Cyworld Digital Music Awards	2011	Song of the Month (July)	"Having an Affair" (with Park Myung-soo ft. Park Bom)	Won	
DAP Awards	2025	Person of the Year	G-Dragon	Won	
European K-pop So-Loved Awards	2013	Best Male Solo Artist	G-Dragon	Won	
Fundex Awards	2025	Best Player of Seasonal/Mini TV Show	Good Day	Won	
Fundex Awards	2025	Popular Star Prize – K-Show Male Player	Good Day	Won	
Fuse TV	2013	Best New Artist	G-Dragon	Won	
Gaon Chart Music Awards	2018	Song of the Year (June)	"Untitled, 2014"	Won	
Golden Disc Awards	2013	Popularity Award	G-Dragon	Won	
Golden Disc Awards	2013	Digital Bonsang	One of a Kind	Won	
Golden Disc Awards	2014	Digital Bonsang	"Crooked"	Nominated	
Golden Disc Awards	2014	Popularity Award	"Crooked"	Nominated	
Golden Disc Awards	2014	Disk Bonsang	Coup d'Etat	Nominated	
Golden Disc Awards	2018	Digital Bonsang	"Untitled, 2014"	Nominated	
Golden Disc Awards	2018	Popularity Award	"Untitled, 2014"	Nominated	
Golden Disc Awards	2026	Disk Bonsang	Übermensch	Won	
Golden Disc Awards	2026	Album Daesang (Album of the Year)	Übermensch	Nominated	
Golden Disc Awards	2026	Digital Bonsang	"Home Sweet Home"	Won	
Golden Disc Awards	2026	Digital Daesang (Song of the Year)	"Home Sweet Home"	Won	
Golden Disc Awards	2026	Artist of the Year (Daesang)	G-Dragon	Nominated	
Hanteo Music Awards	2025	Artist of the Year	G-Dragon	Nominated	
Hanteo Music Awards	2025	Global Artist Award - Africa	G-Dragon	Nominated	
Hanteo Music Awards	2025	Global Artist Award - Asia	G-Dragon	Nominated	
Hanteo Music Awards	2025	Global Artist Award - Europe	G-Dragon	Nominated	
Hanteo Music Awards	2025	Global Artist Award - North America	G-Dragon	Nominated	
Hanteo Music Awards	2025	Global Artist Award - Oceania	G-Dragon	Nominated	
Hanteo Music Awards	2025	Global Artist Award - South America	G-Dragon	Nominated	
Hanteo Music Awards	2026	Artist of the Year	G-Dragon	Won	
Hanteo Music Awards	2026	Best Continent Artist – Africa	G-Dragon	Nominated	
Hanteo Music Awards	2026	Best Continent Artist – Asia	G-Dragon	Nominated	
Hanteo Music Awards	2026	Best Continent Artist – Europe	G-Dragon	Nominated	
Hanteo Music Awards	2026	Best Continent Artist – South America	G-Dragon	Nominated	
Hanteo Music Awards	2026	Best Continent Artist – North America	G-Dragon	Nominated	
Hanteo Music Awards	2026	Best Continent Artist – North Oceania	G-Dragon	Nominated	
Hanteo Music Awards	2026	Best Popular Artist	G-Dragon	Nominated	
Hanteo Music Awards	2026	Best Global Popular Artist	G-Dragon	Nominated	
Hanteo Music Awards	2026	Best Song (Daesang)	"Too Bad"	Won	
Hito Music Awards	2014	Western Song of the Year	"Coup d'Etat"	Won	
ICT Awards Korea	2025	Grand Prix	'G-DRAGON MEDIA EXHIBITION: Übermensch'	Won	
InStyle Star Icon Awards	2016	Male Idol Fashionista	G-Dragon	Won	
iMBC Awards	2025	Best Solo	G-Dragon	Nominated	
iMBC Awards	2025	Best Photo	G-Dragon	Won	
International Dance Music Awards	2014	Best Dubstep/Drum & Bass Track	"Dirty Vibe" (with Skrillex, Diplo, CL)	Nominated	
JTBC Awards	2015	Newsroom Interview Awards	G-Dragon	Won	
K-World Dream Awards	2025	Best Music	G-Dragon	Won	
Korea Grand Music Awards	2025	Best Artist 10	G-Dragon	Nominated	
Korea Grand Music Awards	2025	Trend of the Year - K-Pop solo	G-Dragon	Nominated	
Korea Grand Music Awards	2025	Best Hip-Hop	"Home Sweet Home"	Nominated	
Korea Grand Music Awards	2025	Best Music Video	"Power"	Nominated	
Korea Grand Music Awards	2025	Best Dance Performance	"Too Bad"	Nominated	
Korea Grand Music Awards	2025	Best Music 10	Übermensch	Nominated	
Korean Hip-Hop Awards	2017	Best Collaboration	"₩ 1,000,000" (with Okasian, BewhY, CL)	Nominated	
Korean Music Awards	2013	Song of the Year (Daesang)	"One of a Kind"	Nominated	
Korean Music Awards	2013	Best Rap/Hip-hop Song	"One of a Kind"	Won	
Korean Music Awards	2013	Best Dance/Electronic Album	One of a Kind	Nominated	
Korean Music Awards	2014	Best Dance/Electronic Song	"Crooked"	Nominated	
Korean Music Awards	2014	Male Musician of the Year – Netizen Vote	G-Dragon	Won	
Korean Music Awards	2025	Best Rap/Hip-hop Song	"Power"	Won	
KOMCA Grand Prize 2018	2018	Most Royalties and Copyrighted Song in 2017	G-Dragon	Won	
MBC Entertainment Awards	2012	Style Guinness Award	G-Dragon	Won	
MBC Entertainment Awards	2013	Best Couple Award	Jung Hyung-don & G-Dragon	Won	
Melon Music Awards	2009	Album of the Year (Daesang)	Heartbreaker	Won	
Melon Music Awards	2009	Top 10	Heartbreaker	Won	
Melon Music Awards	2011	Hot Trend Award	"Having an Affair" (with Park Myung-soo ft. Park Bom)	Won	
Melon Music Awards	2011	Song of the Year (Daesang)	"Having an Affair" (with Park Myung-soo ft. Park Bom)	Nominated	
Melon Music Awards	2011	Best Rap/Hip Hop Award	"Oh Yeah" (feat. Park Bom)	Won	
Melon Music Awards	2012	Top 10	"Crayon"	Nominated	
Melon Music Awards	2013	Album of the Year (Daesang)	Coup d'Etat	Nominated	
Melon Music Awards	2013	Artist of the Year (Daesang)	G-Dragon	Nominated	
Melon Music Awards	2013	Top 10	G-Dragon	Won	
Melon Music Awards	2013	Netizen Popularity Award	"Who You?"	Nominated	
Melon Music Awards	2013	Song of the Year (Daesang)	"Who You?"	Nominated	
Melon Music Awards	2015	Hot Trend Award	Infinite Challenge Festival	Won	
Melon Music Awards	2015	Hot Trend Award	"Mapsosa" with Taeyang & Hwang Kwanghee	Won	
Melon Music Awards	2017	Kakao Hot Star Award	G-Dragon	Nominated	
Melon Music Awards	2017	Best Album Award	Kwon Ji Yong	Nominated	
Melon Music Awards	2017	Best Song Award	"Untitled, 2014"	Nominated	
Melon Music Awards	2017	Best R&B/Soul Award	"Untitled, 2014"	Nominated	
Melon Music Awards	2025	Japan Favorite Artist	G-Dragon	Nominated	
Melon Music Awards	2025	Berriz Global Fan's Choice	G-Dragon	Nominated	
Melon Music Awards	2025	Artist of the Year (Daesang)	G-Dragon	Won	
Melon Music Awards	2025	Best Male Solo	G-Dragon	Won	
Melon Music Awards	2025	Top 10 Artist	G-Dragon	Won	
Melon Music Awards	2025	Best Songwriter	G-Dragon	Won	
Melon Music Awards	2025	Album of the Year (Daesang)	Übermensch	Won	
Melon Music Awards	2025	Millions Top 10	Übermensch	Won	
Melon Music Awards	2025	Song of the Year (Daesang)	"Home Sweet Home"	Won	
Melon Music Awards	2026	Global TOP10	G-Dragon	Won	
Music Awards Japan	2026	Special Award: Korean Popular Music	"Power"	Won	
Music Awards Japan	2026	Best K-Pop Artist	G-Dragon	Longlisted	
Music Awards Japan	2026	Best Album	Übermensch	Longlisted	
Music Awards Japan	2026	Song of the Year	"Home Sweet Home"	Longlisted	
Music Awards Japan	2026	Artist of the Year	G-Dragon	Longlisted	
Mnet Asian Music Awards	2007	Music Arrangement	"Lies"	Won	
Mnet Asian Music Awards	2009	Album of the Year (Daesang)	Heartbreaker	Won	
Mnet Asian Music Awards	2009	Best Male Solo Artist	"Heartbreaker"	Nominated	
Mnet Asian Music Awards	2009	Best House & Electronic	"Heartbreaker"	Nominated	
Mnet Asian Music Awards	2012	Best Male Artist	"Crayon"	Won	
Mnet Asian Music Awards	2012	Artist of the Year (Daesang)	"Crayon"	Nominated	
Mnet Asian Music Awards	2012	Album of the Year (Daesang)	One of a Kind	Nominated	
Mnet Asian Music Awards	2013	Best Male Artist	"Crooked"	Won	
Mnet Asian Music Awards	2013	Album of the Year (Daesang)	Coup d'Etat	Nominated	
Mnet Asian Music Awards	2013	Artist of the Year (Daesang)	G-Dragon	Won	
Mnet Asian Music Awards	2013	Best Dance Performance – Male Solo	"Crooked"	Won	
Mnet Asian Music Awards	2013	Song of the Year (Daesang)	"Crooked"	Nominated	
Mnet Asian Music Awards	2013	Nissan Juke Best Music Video	"Coup d'Etat"	Won	
Mnet Asian Music Awards	2017	Artist of the Year (Daesang)	G-Dragon	Nominated	
Mnet Asian Music Awards	2017	Best Male Artist	G-Dragon	Nominated	
Mnet Asian Music Awards	2024	Music Visionary of the Year	G-Dragon	Won	
Mnet Asian Music Awards	2025	Artist of the Year (Daesang)	G-Dragon	Won	
Mnet Asian Music Awards	2025	Worldwide Icon of the Year	G-Dragon	Nominated	
Mnet Asian Music Awards	2025	Fans' Choice Top 10 – Male	G-Dragon	Won	
Mnet Asian Music Awards	2025	Best Male Artist	G-Dragon	Won	
Mnet Asian Music Awards	2025	Album of the Year (Daesang)	Übermensch	Nominated	
Mnet Asian Music Awards	2025	Song of the Year (Daesang)	"Too Bad"	Nominated	
Mnet Asian Music Awards	2025	Best Dance Performance – Male Solo	"Too Bad"	Won	
Mnet Asian Music Awards	2025	Best Choreography	"Too Bad"	Nominated	
Mnet Asian Music Awards	2025	Best Collaboration	"Too Bad"	Nominated	
Mnet Asian Music Awards	2026	Best Collaboration	"WDA (Whole Different Animal)" with Aespa	Pending	
MTV Iggy	2013	Song of the Year	"Crooked"	Won	
MTV Video Music Awards Japan	2010	Best Collaboration Video	"Rain is Fallin"	Won	
Philippine K-pop Awards	2017	Best Male Solo Artist	G-Dragon	Won	
QQ Music Awards	2014	Most Popular Korean & Japanese Artist	G-Dragon	Won	
QQ Music Awards	2015	Most Popular Korean & Japanese Artist	G-Dragon	Won	
QQ Music Awards	2016	Influential Male Artist of The Year	G-Dragon	Won	
QQ Music Dianfeng Awards	2024	Top Korean Songs of The Year	"Home Sweet Home"	Won	
QQ Music Dianfeng Awards	2024	Top 10 Singles of The Year	"Power"	Won	
QQ Music Dianfeng Awards	2025	Korean Album of The Year	Übermensch	Won	
Rhythmer Awards	2013	Hip Hop Single of the Year	"One of a Kind"	Won	
RTHK International Pop Poll Awards	2014	Top Ten International Gold Songs	"Missing You"	Nominated	
RTHK International Pop Poll Awards	2014	Top Male Artist	G-Dragon	Won	
RTHK International Pop Poll Awards	2025	Top Album Award (Korea)	Übermensch	Won	
SBS MTV Best of the Best	2013	Album of the Year	Coup d'Etat	Won	
SBS MTV Best of the Best	2013	Artist of the Year	G-Dragon	Nominated	
Seoul Music Awards	2013	Record of the Year	One of a Kind	Won	
Seoul Music Awards	2018	Bonsang Award	G-Dragon	Nominated	
Seoul Music Awards	2018	Popularity Award	G-Dragon	Nominated	
Seoul Music Awards	2018	Hallyu Special Award	G-Dragon	Nominated	
Seoul Music Awards	2025	Main Prize (Bonsang)	G-Dragon	Won	
Seoul Music Awards	2025	Grand Prize (Daesang)	G-Dragon	Nominated	
Seoul Music Awards	2025	Popularity Award	G-Dragon	Nominated	
Seoul Music Awards	2025	K-Wave Special Award	G-Dragon	Nominated	
Seoul Music Awards	2025	K-pop World Choice – Solo	G-Dragon	Nominated	
Seoul Music Awards	2025	R&B/ Hip-hop Award	"Too Bad"	Nominated	
Singapore Entertainment Awards	2012	Most Popular K-pop Music Video	"Crayon"	Nominated	
Singapore Entertainment Awards	2013	Most Popular K-pop Music Video	"Crooked"	Nominated	
Style Icon Awards	2013	Style Icon of the Year	G-Dragon	Won	
Style Icon Awards	2013	Top 10 Style Icons	G-Dragon	Won	
Style Icon Awards	2014	Top 10 Style Icons	G-Dragon	Nominated	
Style Icon Awards	2016	Top 10 Style Icons	G-Dragon	Won	
Style Icon Awards	2016	Style Icon of the Year	G-Dragon	Won	
Tencent Music Year End Awards	2024	K-Pop Artist of the Year	G-Dragon	Won	
Tencent Music Year End Awards	2024	K-Pop Solo Artist of the Year	G-Dragon	Won	
Tencent Music Year End Awards	2024	K-Pop Song of the Year	"Power"	Won	
Tencent Music Year End Awards	2024	K-Pop Best-selling Single	"Power"	Won	
Tencent Music Year End Awards	2024	K-Pop Highest Score Songs	"Power"	Won	
Tencent Music Year End Awards	2024	K-Pop Highest Score Songs	"Home Sweet Home"	Won	
Tencent Music Year End Awards	2025	Korean Song of the Year	"Home Sweet Home"	Won	
Tencent Music Year End Awards	2025	Longest Korean Song On The 2025 Charts (album version)	"Home Sweet Home"	Won	
Tencent Music Year End Awards	2025	Longest Korean Song On The 2025 Charts (single version)	"Home Sweet Home"	Won	
Tencent Music Year End Awards	2025	Korean Song of the Year	"Take Me"	Won	
Tencent Music Year End Awards	2025	Longest Korean Song On The 2025 Charts	"Take Me"	Won	
Tencent Music Year End Awards	2025	Korean Song of the Year	"Too Bad"	Won	
Tencent Music Year End Awards	2025	Highest Score For A Korean Song In History	"Too Bad"	Won	
Tencent Music Year End Awards	2025	Top 10 Korean High Score Songs Of The Year	"Too Bad"	Won	
Tencent Music Year End Awards	2025	Longest Korean Song On The 2025 Charts	"Too Bad"	Won	
Tencent Music Year End Awards	2025	Top 10 Korean High Score Songs Of The Year	"Drama"	Won	
Tencent Music Year End Awards	2025	Longest Korean Song On The 2025 Charts	"Drama"	Won	
Tencent Music Year End Awards	2025	Longest Korean Song On The 2025 Charts	"IBELONGIIU"	Won	
Tencent Music Year End Awards	2025	Korean album of the Year	Übermensch	Won	
Tencent Music Year End Awards	2025	Korean Artist of the Year	G-Dragon	Won	
Tencent Music Year End Awards	2025	Korean Solo Artist of the Year	G-Dragon	Won	
TMElive International Music Awards	2025	International Single of the Year	"Home Sweet Home"	Won	
V Chart Awards	2014	Top Male Artist	G-Dragon	Nominated	
V Chart Awards	2014	Best Music Video of the Year	"Coup d'Etat"	Won	
World Music Awards	2014	World's Best Male Artist	G-Dragon	Nominated	
World Music Awards	2014	World's Best Live Act	G-Dragon	Nominated	
World Music Awards	2014	World's Best Entertainer of the Year	G-Dragon	Won	
World Music Awards	2014	World's Best Video	"Crooked"	Nominated	
World Music Awards	2014	World's Best Album	Coup d'Etat	Won	
Youku Tudou Young Choice Awards	2013	Favorite International Artist	G-Dragon	Won	
YouTube Music Awards	2015	Honored Artist	Good Boy with Taeyang	Won	

== Other accolades ==
=== State and cultural honors ===
Name of country or organization, year given, and name of honor
Country or organization	Year	Honor	Ref.
South Korea	2010	Minister of Culture, Sports and Tourism Commendation	
South Korea	2016	Prime Minister's Commendation	
South Korea	2025	Okgwan Order of Cultural Merit (4th class)	

=== Listicles ===
Name of publisher, year listed, name of listicle, and placement
Publisher	Year	Listicle	Placement	Ref.
Arena Korea	2008	Most Influential Men of the Year	1st	
Business of Fashion	2015	BoF 500 (Note: The BoF 500 is an annual fashion industry power list of global figures who have made an impact in the $2.4 trillion fashion industry.)	Included	
Complex	2025	The 25 Best Dressed Celebs of the 21st Century	16th	
Forbes	2012	2030 Power Leaders List	Included	
Forbes	2013	2030 Power Leaders List	Included	
Forbes	2014	2030 Power Leaders List	Included	
Forbes	2016	30 Under 30 – Asia	Included	
Forbes	2018	Korea Power Celebrity 40	21st	
Forbes	2026	Korea Power Celebrity 40	2nd	
Forbes	2025	K-Idol of the Year 30 – Korea	11th	
Forbes	2026	Top Power Celebrity (Note: Selected from approximately 70 candidates for the Forbes Korea Power Celebrity 40 "Top 'Power Celebrity'".)	1st	
Gallup Korea	2013	Top 10 Singers of the Year	10th	
Gallup Korea	2024	Most Loved K-Pop Solo Singer of the 21st Century	3rd	
Golden Disc Awards	2025	Golden Disc Powerhouse 40	Included	
GQ Korea	2015	Men of the Year for 2015	Included	
The Guardian	2018	The 30 best boyband members	11th	
Hypebeast	2013	100 Most Influential People in Fashion	Included	
Hypebeast	2015	100 Most Influential People in Fashion	Included	
Hypebeast	2016	100 Most Influential People in Fashion	Included	
Hypebeast	2017	100 Most Influential People in Fashion	Included	
Hypebeast	2021	100 Most Influential People in Fashion	Included	
Hypebeast	2022	100 Most Influential People in Fashion	Included	
Hypebeast	2023	100 Most Influential People in Fashion	Included	
Hypebeast	2024	100 Most Influential People in Fashion	Included	
Hypebeast	2025	100 Most Influential People in Fashion	Included	
Ilgan Sports	2013	Most Influential Entities in K-pop	4th	
Sisa Journal (Note: The Sisa Journal is one of the major weekly news magazines in Korea. Established in 1989, its annually conducted 'Who Moves Korea' survey determines the most influential figures in the country and highlights next-generation leaders of Korea. The survey is conducted on a total of 1000 experts across 10 fields, including professors, journalists, politicians, businessmen, and cultural artists.)	2018	Next Generation Culture Leaders	26th	

== See also ==
- List of awards and nominations received by Big Bang
- List of awards and nominations received by GD X Taeyang
- List of awards and nominations received by GD & TOP
