= 2025 Melon Music Awards =

2025 South Korean music award ceremony

- Coming soon poster
- Date: December 20, 2025
- Venue: Gocheok Sky Dome
- Country: South Korea

Highlights
- Most wins: G-Dragon (7)
- Most nominations: G-Dragon (9)
- Website: melon.com/mma/info.htm

Television/radio coverage
- Network: Melon; Wavve; U-Next (Japan); MagentaTV (some EU markets); 1theK (ex. KR, JP and parts of EU)

The 2025 Melon Music Awards (Korean: 2025 멜론 뮤직어워드), part of the Melon Music Awards series, was held on December 20, 2025, at the Gocheok Sky Dome in Seoul, South Korea. Organized by Melon and its parent company Kakao Entertainment, the broadcast was aired through Melon and Wavve in South Korea, U-Next in Japan, MagentaTV in selected European territories and 1theK elsewhere.

G-Dragon is the biggest winner of the night, winning seven awards, with three Daesangs for Song of the Year, Artist of the Year, and Album of the Year, while Record of the Year went to Jennie.

== Criteria ==
All songs and albums that are eligible to be nominated must be released from October 31, 2024, to November 19, 2025.

Category	Digital sales	Online voting	Panelist
Grand Prize (Note: Consists of Album of the Year, Artist of the Year, and Song of the Year)	60%	20%	20%
Record of the Year	N/A		100%
Main Awards (Note: Consists of Top 10 Artists, Rookie of the Year, Best Pop Artist, Best Male Solo, Best Female Solo, Best Male Group, Best Female Group, and Best OST)	60%	20%	20%
Millions Top 10	80%	20%	N/A
Special Awards (Note: Consists of Stage of the Year, Hot Trend, Best Performance – Female, Best Performance – Male, Best Music Video, Songwriter Award, J-Pop Favorite Artist, Global Artist, Global Rising Artist, Best Music Style, and 1theK Global Icon)	N/A		100%
Kakao Bank's Favorite Star Award	N/A	80%	20%
Berriz Global Fan's Choice	N/A	80%	20%
Track Zero Choice	20%	20%	60%
Japan Favorite Artist by U-Next	N/A	50%	50%

== Performers ==
The list of performers was announced throughout November, with the final line-up revealed on November 20.

List of performances
Artist(s)	Song(s) performed	Segment
Alpha Drive One	"Hola Solar" (MMA version) "Formula"	K-pop Formula: Cleared for Takeoff
KiiiKiii	"To Me from Me" (MMA version) "I Do Me" (MMA version) "Dancing Alone" (MMA version)	나의 모든 순간 들에게
Hanroro	"0+0" "Landing in Love"	Me: Self Love
Woodz	"Drowning" "00:30"	You: Release
10cm	"CDEFG" (acoustic version) "To Reach You" (with Joo Woo-jae)	Us: Unrequited Love
Idid	"Chan-Ran" (MMA version) "Push Back" (MMA version)	The Adventures of Idid
Jay Park H1ghr Music Lngshot	"DNA" (remix; Jay Park solo) "Blue Check" (Jay Park solo) "The Purge" (H1ghr Music) "Back Seat" (Lngshot) "Saucin'" (Lngshot) "Keep It Sexy (Mommae 2)" (with Dayoung; Jay Park)	History
AllDay Project	"One More Time" "Look At Me" "Famous"	All Day, Level Up
Hearts2Hearts	"The Chase" (MMA version) "Focus" (MMA version)	Into the Secret Garden
Illit	"Do the Dance" "Not Cute Anymore"	Now Trending: Illit
NCT Wish	"Poppop" "Videohood" "Color"	Midnight: Wish
Riize	"Fame" "Bag Bad Back" "Fly Up"	The World in My Hands
BoyNextDoor	"Hollywood Action" (MMA version) "If I Say, I Love You"	Next BoyNextDoor: Finding Our Next Home
Zico	"Tough Cookie" "No You Can't" "Duet" (with Lilas)	Count It!
Ive	"XOXZ" "Attitude" "Rebel Heart"	Dominance Mode
Plave	"Dash" "BBUU!"	Our Journey with PLLI: Complete
Exo	"Wolf" "Monster" "The Eve" "Love Shot" "Growl" "Back It Up"	Embark on the Beyond
Aespa	"Drift" "Rich Man" "Dirty Work"	No Limits
Jennie	"Seoul City" "Zen" "Like Jennie"	Nirvana to Self
G-Dragon	"Drama" (with Song So-hee; dance performance by Choi Ho-jong) "Power" "Home Sweet Home" (Note: Pre-recorded appearance by Daesung and Taeyang.) "Too Bad" (Big Naughty and Dress remix; dance performance by RHTokyo) "Too Bad" (Alan Walker remix) "Crooked"	G-Dragon as an Aphorism

== Presenters ==
The line-up of presenters was announced on December 18.

- Ahn Jae-hyun – presented Top 10 Artists
- Bae Hyun-sung and Jung Ji-so – presented New Artist of the Year and Best Male Solo
- Mimiminu – presented Top 10 Artists
- Jeong Hyeok and Kani – presented Berriz Global Fan's Choice and Best Producer
- Son Na-eun – presented Top 10 Artists
- Shin Eun-soo – presented Top 10 Artists
- Moon Sang-min – presented Best Male Group and Best Female Group
- Cha Jun-hwan – presented Millions Top 10
- Kim Jae-won and Shin Do-hyun – presented Best Music Video and Track Zero Choice
- Kim Ye-won and Shin Seung-ho – presented Hot Trend and Best Music Style
- Joo Woo-jae and Kwaktube – presented Stage of the Year and Best Songwriter
- Kim Min-ha – presented Millions Top 10
- Kim Ji-yeon and Kim Min-kyu – presented New Artist of the Year and 1theK Global Icon
- Orbit and Wing – presented Best Performance – Female and Best Performance – Male
- Han Ji-eun and Ryu Kyung-soo – presented Japan Favorite Artist by U-Next
- Heo Nam-jun and Ok Ja-yeon – presented Global Rising Artist and Best Music Style
- Noh Sang-hyun – presented Millions Top 10
- Kim Do-wan and Ryu Hye-young – presented Kakao Bank Everyone's Star and Global Artist
- Park Eun-bin – presented Record of the Year (Daesang) and Album of the Year (Daesang)
- Yoon Jong-shin – presented Artist of the Year (Daesang) and Song of the Year (Daesang)

== Winners and nominees ==
The list of nominees for the Top 10 Award was announced on November 20, 2025, through the official website. Voting took place from November 20 to December 4, 2025. The remaining categories, excluding Record of the Year and Hot Trend Award, will be announced on December 5. Voting began that same day and will end on December 19.

The Top 10 Artists winners were announced on December 5, while the remaining categories will be revealed during the ceremony on December 20. Winners and nominees are listed in alphanumerical order, with winners listed first and emphasised in bold.

=== Grand Prize ===
**Album of the Year** **(Daesang)**: **G-Dragon – Übermensch**; Babymonster – Drip; IU – A Flower Bookmark 3; Ive – Ive Empathy; Jennie – Ruby; Lim Young-woong – Im Hero 2; Plave – Caligo Pt. 1; Riize – Odyssey; Rosé – Rosie; Seventeen – Happy Burstday	**Artist of the Year** **(Daesang)**: **G-Dragon**; Aespa; BoyNextDoor; Ive; Jennie; Lim Young-woong; NCT Wish; Plave; Riize; Rosé
**Song of the Year** **(Daesang)**: **G-Dragon – "Home Sweet Home" (featuring Taeyang and Daesung)**; 10cm – "To Reach You"; Babymonster – "Drip"; BoyNextDoor – "If I Say, I Love You"; Huntrix – "Golden"; Ive – "Rebel Heart"; Jennie – "Like Jennie"; Park Da-hye and Maktub – "Starting With You"; Rosé – "Toxic Till the End"; Zo Zazz – "Don't You Know"	**Record of the Year** **(Daesang)**: **Jennie**

=== Main awards ===
List of winners and nominees for the main awards
**Top 10 Artists**: **Aespa**; **BoyNextDoor**; **G-Dragon**; **Ive**; **Jennie**; **Lim Young-woong**; **NCT Wish**; **Plave**; **Riize**; **Rosé**; List of nominees: 10cm; AllDay Project; Babymonster; Blackpink; Day6; Hearts2Hearts; Hwang Karam; Illit; IU; JAESSBEE; KiiiKiii; Le Sserafim; Maktub; Meovv; NCT Dream; Ovan; Seventeen; Tomorrow X Together; Woody; Zo Zazz	**Millions Top 10**: **BoyNextDoor – No Genre**; **G-Dragon – Übermensch**; **IU – A Flower Bookmark 3**; **Ive – Ive Empathy**; **Jennie – Ruby**; **Lim Young-woong – Im Hero 2**; **Plave – Caligo Pt. 1**; **Riize – Odyssey**; **Rosé – Rosie**; **Seventeen – Happy Burstday**; List of nominees: Baekhyun – Essence of Reverie; BSS – Teleparty; CxM – Hype Vibes; Day6 – The Decade; Doyoung – Soar; Haechan – Taste; Isegye Idol – Stargazers; Jin – Happy; Lee Chan-won – Brilliant; Mark – The Firstfruit; NCT Dream – Go Back To The Future; NCT Wish – Color; Nmixx – Blue Valentine; Sungjin – 30; Tomorrow X Together – The Star Chapter: Sanctuary; Zerobaseone – Blue Paradise
**Best Male Solo**: **G-Dragon**; 10cm; Lim Young-woong; Maktub; Zo Zazz	**Best Female Solo**: **Rosé**; IU; Jennie; Jisoo; Taeyeon
**Best Male Group**: **BoyNextDoor**; Plave; Riize; Seventeen; Tomorrow X Together	**Best Female Group**: **Ive**; Aespa; Babymonster; Hearts2Hearts; Le Sserafim
**New Artist of the Year**: **AllDay Project**; **Hearts2Hearts**; JAESSBEE; KiiiKiii; Zo Zazz	**Best Pop Artist**: **Ed Sheeran**; Don Toliver; Justin Bieber; Katseye; Lady Gaga
**Best OST**: **Huntrix – "Golden" (from KPop Demon Hunters)**; D.O. – "Forever" (from Resident Playbook); Lee Chang-sub – "True Love" (from Secret Relationship); Plave – "We Don't Stop" (from The Fiery Priest); Tomorrow X Together – "When the Day Comes" (from Resident Playbook)

=== Popularity awards ===
List of winners for the special awards
**Track Zero Choice**: **Hanroro – "Goodbye, My Summer"**; Baek Hyun-jin – "Mogwa"; Chudahye Chagis – "Jakdu: Standing on Blades"; CHS – "Echo"; Effie – "More Hyper"; Kim Oki – "Lucky" (featuring Wonstein); Sanmanhan – "Heart of a Dog"; Shin In Ryu – "Attack!"; Wah Wah Wah and Noridogam – "Uncertainty"; Woo Hui-jun – "Spacious House"	**Berriz Global Fan's Choice**: **Hearts2Hearts**; Aespa; AllDay Project; Babymonster; BoyNextDoor; Day6; G-Dragon; Illit; IU; Ive; Jennie; KiiiKiii; Meovv; NCT Dream; NCT Wish; Plave; Riize; Rosé; Stray Kids; Zerobaseone
**Kakao Bank Everyone's Star**: **NCT Wish**; AllDay Project; Aespa; BoyNextDoor; Day6; G-Dragon; Ive; Jennie; Riize; Tomorrow X Together	**Japan Favorite Artist by U-Next**: **BoyNextDoor**; Aespa; G-Dragon; Ive; Riize

=== Special awards ===
List of winners for the special awards
**Best Music Style**: **10cm**; **AllDay Project**	**Best Music Video**: **KiiiKiii – "I Do Me"**
**Best Performance – Female**: **Illit**	**Best Performance – Male**: **Riize**
**Best Producer**: **Zico** (**KOZ Entertainment**)	**Best Songwriter**: **G-Dragon**
**1theK Global Icon**: **KiiiKiii**	**Hot Trend**: **Woodz**
**Global Artist**: **Aespa**	**Global Rising Artist**: **Idid**
**J-Pop Favorite Artist**: **Kenshi Yonezu**	**Stage of the Year**: **Aespa – Synk: Aexis Line**

== Multiple awards ==
The following artist(s) received two or more awards:

Count	Artist(s)
7	G-Dragon
4	BoyNextDoor
3	Aespa
3	Ive
3	Jennie
3	Riize
3	Rosé
2	AllDay Project
2	Hearts2Hearts
2	KiiiKiii
2	Lim Young-woong
2	NCT Wish
2	Plave
