= List of Circle Digital Chart number ones of 2025 =

The Circle Digital Chart is a chart that ranks the best-performing singles in South Korea. Managed by the domestic Ministry of Culture, Sports and Tourism (MCST), its data is compiled by the Korea Music Content Industry Association and published by the Circle Chart. The ranking is based collectively on each single's download sales, stream count, and background music use. The Circle Chart provides weekly (listed from Sunday to Saturday), monthly, and yearly lists for the chart.

== Weekly charts ==
List of number-one songs on the weekly Circle Digital Chart in 2025
Week ending date	Song	Artist(s)	Ref.
January 4	"APT."	Rosé and Bruno Mars	
January 11	"Home Sweet Home"	G-Dragon featuring Taeyang and Daesung	
January 18	"Home Sweet Home"	G-Dragon featuring Taeyang and Daesung	
January 25	"Home Sweet Home"	G-Dragon featuring Taeyang and Daesung	
February 1	"Home Sweet Home"	G-Dragon featuring Taeyang and Daesung	
February 8	"Home Sweet Home"	G-Dragon featuring Taeyang and Daesung	
February 15	"Rebel Heart"	Ive	
February 22	"Rebel Heart"	Ive	
March 1	"Too Bad"	G-Dragon featuring Anderson .Paak	
March 8	"Too Bad"	G-Dragon featuring Anderson .Paak	
March 15	"Too Bad"	G-Dragon featuring Anderson .Paak	
March 22	"Too Bad"	G-Dragon featuring Anderson .Paak	
March 29	"Too Bad"	G-Dragon featuring Anderson .Paak	
April 5	"Too Bad"	G-Dragon featuring Anderson .Paak	
April 12	"Too Bad"	G-Dragon featuring Anderson .Paak	
April 19	"Heavenly Ever After" (천국보다 아름다운)	Lim Young-woong	
April 26	"Like Jennie"	Jennie	
May 3	"Like Jennie"	Jennie	
May 10	"Drowning" †	Woodz	
May 17	"To Reach You" (너에게 닿기를)	10cm	
May 24	"To Reach You" (너에게 닿기를)	10cm	
May 31	"Thunder"	Seventeen	
June 7	"To Reach You" (너에게 닿기를)	10cm	
June 14	"To Reach You" (너에게 닿기를)	10cm	
June 21	"To Reach You" (너에게 닿기를)	10cm	
June 28	"To Reach You" (너에게 닿기를)	10cm	
July 5	"Famous"	AllDay Project	
July 12	"Famous"	AllDay Project	
July 19	"Golden"	Huntrix	
July 26	"Golden"	Huntrix	
August 2	"Golden"	Huntrix	
August 9	"Golden"	Huntrix	
August 16	"Golden"	Huntrix	
August 23	"Golden"	Huntrix	
August 30	"Golden"	Huntrix	
September 6	"Golden"	Huntrix	
September 13	"Golden"	Huntrix	
September 20	"Golden"	Huntrix	
September 27	"Golden"	Huntrix	
October 4	"Golden"	Huntrix	
October 11	"Golden"	Huntrix	
October 18	"Golden"	Huntrix	
October 25	"Golden"	Huntrix	
November 1	"Blue Valentine"	Nmixx	
November 8	"Blue Valentine"	Nmixx	
November 15	"Blue Valentine"	Nmixx	
November 22	"Blue Valentine"	Nmixx	
November 29	"Good Goodbye"	Hwasa	
December 6	"Good Goodbye"	Hwasa	
December 13	"Good Goodbye"	Hwasa	
December 20	"Good Goodbye"	Hwasa	
December 27	"Good Goodbye"	Hwasa	

== Monthly charts ==
List of number-one songs on the monthly Circle Digital Chart in 2025
Month	Song	Artist(s)	Ref.
January	"Home Sweet Home"	G-Dragon featuring Taeyang and Daesung	
February	"Rebel Heart"	Ive	
March	"Too Bad"	G-Dragon featuring Anderson .Paak	
April	"Too Bad"	G-Dragon featuring Anderson .Paak	
May	"To Reach You" (너에게 닿기를)	10cm	
June	"To Reach You" (너에게 닿기를)	10cm	
July	"Golden"	Huntrix	
August	"Golden"	Huntrix	
September	"Golden"	Huntrix	
October	"Golden"	Huntrix	
November	"Blue Valentine"	Nmixx	
December	"Good Goodbye"	Hwasa	
