= Inside Out (Day6 song) =

Single by Day6

from the album The Decade
- Language: Korean
- Released: September 5, 2025
- Length: 3:00
- Label: JYP
- Composers: Young K; Sungjin; Wonpil; Hong Ji-sang
- Lyricist: Young K

Day6 singles chronology
"Maybe Tomorrow" (2025)	"Inside Out" (2025)	"Dream Bus" (2025)

Music video
- "Inside Out" on YouTube

"Inside Out" is a song recorded by South Korean boy band Day6 for their fourth studio album, The Decade. It was released as the album's lead single alongside the song "Dream Bus" by JYP Entertainment on September 5, 2025.

== Background and release ==
On August 18, JYP Entertainment first revealed that Day6 would have a double title track through Day6's social media accounts as the track list was posted. On August 30 and 31, Day6 held a debut 10th anniversary tour 'DAY6 10th Anniversary Tour The Decade' at the Goyang Stadium in Goyang, in which they first performed "Inside Out".

== Composition ==
"Inside Out" Is written by Young K and composed by Young K, Sungjin, Wonpil and Hong Ji-sang. The song is composed in the key B Minor and has 127 beats per minute and a running time of 3 minutes.

It's another title song with a very contrasting atmosphere. It's a song that shows a jumbled expression in front of you, inside out, and upside down.

— Young K describing the song

== Credits and personnel ==
Credits adapted from Melon.

Personnel

- Lyrics – Young K
- Composer – Sungjin, Young K, Wonpil, Hong Ji-sang
- Arranger – Hong Ji-sang
- Original publisher – JYP Entertainment
- Sub-publisher – JYP Entertainment
- Computer programmer – Hong Ji-sang
- Background vocals – Sungjin, Young K, Wonpil
- Electric guitar – Sungjin, Hong Ji-sang
- Bass – Young K, Hong Ji-sang
- Keyboards – Wonpil, Hong Ji-sang
- Percussions – Hong Ji-sang
- Drums – Dowoon
- Drum technicians – Jeon Dae-jeong, Hong Seok-in
- Recorder – Hong Ji-sang @ Jisang's Studio
- Drum recorder – Shin Bong-won, Park Nam-joon @ GLAB Studios
- Mixer – Lee Tae-seop @ JYPE Studios
- Mixer – Dolby Atmos by Shin Bong-won (Asst. Park Nam-joon) @ GLAB Studios
- Mastered – Park Jung-eon @ Honey Butter Studio

== Charts ==
=== Weekly charts ===
Weekly chart performance for "Inside Out"
Chart (2025)	Peak position
South Korea (Circle)	22
South Korea (K-pop Hot 100)	10

=== Monthly charts ===
Monthly chart performance for "Inside Out"
Chart (September 2025)	Peak position
South Korea (Circle)	38

== Release history ==
Release history
Region	Date	Format	Label
Various	September 5, 2025	Digital download; streaming	JYP
