= Dream Bus =

Single by Day6

from the album The Decade
- Language: Korean
- Released: September 5, 2025
- Length: 2:40
- Label: JYP
- Composers: Young K; Sungjin; Wonpil; Hong Ji-sang
- Lyricists: Young K; Hong Ji-sang

Day6 singles chronology
"Inside Out" (2025)	"Dream Bus" (2025)	"Lovin' the Christmas" (2025)

Music video
- "Dream Bus" on YouTube

"Dream Bus" is a song recorded by South Korean boy band Day6 for their fourth studio album, The Decade. It was released as the album's lead single alongside the song "Inside Out" by JYP Entertainment on September 5, 2025.

== Background and release ==
On August 18, JYP Entertainment first revealed that Day6 would have a double title track through Day6's social media accounts as the track list was posted. On August 30 and 31, Day6 held a debut 10th anniversary tour 'DAY6 10th Anniversary Tour The Decade' at the Goyang Stadium in Goyang, in which they first performed "Dream Bus".

== Composition ==
"Dream Bus" Is written by Young K and Hong Ji-sang and composed by Young K, Sungjin, Wonpil and Hong Ji-sang. The song is composed in the key F sharp minor and has 180 beats per minute and a running time of 2 minutes and 40 seconds.

It's a song that compares the life we live on to a bus. The song style is a genre that we like very much and a genre that we are confident in. I thought it was a song that we couldn't miss from our 10th anniversary album, so I chose it as the title song.

— Wonpil describing the song

== Credits and personnel ==
Credits adapted from Melon.

Personnel

- Lyrics – Young K, Hong Ji-sang
- Composer – Sungjin, Young K, Wonpil, Hong Ji-sang
- Arranger - Hong Ji-sang
- Original publisher – JYP Entertainment
- Sub-publisher – JYP Entertainment
- Computer programming – Hong Ji-sang
- Background vocals – Sungjin, Young K, Wonpil
- Electric guitar – Sungjin, Hong Ji-sang
- Bass – Young K, Hong Ji-sang
- Keyboards – Wonpil, Hong Ji-sang
- Drums – Dowoon
- Drum technicians – Jeon Dae-jeong, Hong Seok-in
- Recording – Hong Ji-sang @ Jisang's Studio
- Drum recording – Shin Bong-won, Park Nam-joon @ GLAB Studios
- Mixers – Shin Bong-won (Asst. Park Nam-joon) @ GLAB Studios
- Mixing – in Dolby Atmos by Shin Bong-won (Asst. Park Nam-joon) @ GLAB Studios
- Mastering – Park Jung-eon @ Honey Butter Studio

== Charts ==
=== Weekly charts ===
Weekly chart performance for "Inside Out"
Chart (2025)	Peak position
South Korea (Circle)	17
South Korea (K-pop Hot 100)	12

=== Monthly charts ===
Monthly chart performance for "Inside Out"
Chart (September 2025)	Peak position
South Korea (Circle)	22

== Release history ==
Release history
Region	Date	Format	Label
Various	September 5, 2025	Digital download; streaming	JYP
