= List of number-one international songs of 2015 (South Korea) =

The international Gaon Digital Chart is a chart that ranks the best-performing international songs in South Korea. The data is collected by the Korea Music Content Association. Below is a list of songs that topped the weekly and monthly charts, as according to the Gaon 국외 (Foreign) Digital Chart. The Digital Chart ranks songs according to their performance on the Gaon Download, Streaming, and BGM charts.

== Weekly chart ==
Source: Gaon Digital Chart
| Date | Song | Artist | Total downloads |
|---|---|---|---|
| January 3 | "Problem" | Ariana Grande featuring Iggy Azalea | 54,308 |
| January 10 | "Problem" | Ariana Grande featuring Iggy Azalea | 44,615 |
| January 17 | "Problem" | Ariana Grande featuring Iggy Azalea | 38,902 |
| January 24 | "Problem" | Ariana Grande featuring Iggy Azalea | 34,273 |
| January 31 | "Problem" | Ariana Grande featuring Iggy Azalea | 31,620 |
| February 7 | "Problem" | Ariana Grande featuring Iggy Azalea | 30,801 |
| February 14 | "Sugar" | Maroon 5 | 36,939 |
| February 21 | "Sugar" | Maroon 5 | 36,165 |
| February 28 | "Sugar" | Maroon 5 | 37,532 |
| March 7 | "Sugar" | Maroon 5 | 35,549 |
| March 14 | "Uptown Funk" | Mark Ronson featuring Bruno Mars | 36,616 |
| March 21 | "Uptown Funk" | Mark Ronson featuring Bruno Mars | 39,881 |
| March 28 | "Uptown Funk" | Mark Ronson featuring Bruno Mars | 39,673 |
| April 4 | "Uptown Funk" | Mark Ronson featuring Bruno Mars | 36,674 |
| April 11 | "Uptown Funk" | Mark Ronson featuring Bruno Mars | 36,557 |
| April 18 | "Uptown Funk" | Mark Ronson featuring Bruno Mars | 35,143 |
| April 25 | "Uptown Funk" | Mark Ronson featuring Bruno Mars | 32,511 |
| May 2 | "Uptown Funk" | Mark Ronson featuring Bruno Mars | 34,446 |
| May 9 | "Uptown Funk" | Mark Ronson featuring Bruno Mars | 32,082 |
| May 16 | "Sugar" | Maroon 5 | 36,134 |
| May 23 | "Sugar" | Maroon 5 | 36,863 |
| May 30 | "Sugar" | Maroon 5 | 38,025 |
| June 7 | "Sugar" | Maroon 5 | 35,099 |
| June 14 | "Sugar" | Maroon 5 | 31,214 |
| June 21 | "Sugar" | Maroon 5 | 29,738 |
| June 28 | "Sugar" | Maroon 5 | 30,556 |
| July 4 | "Sugar" | Maroon 5 | 31,742 |
| July 11 | "Sugar" | Maroon 5 | 29,583 |
| July 18 | "Sugar" | Maroon 5 | 27,335 |
| July 25 | "Sugar" | Maroon 5 | 26,864 |
| August 1 | "Sugar" | Maroon 5 | 27,777 |
| August 8 | "Sugar" | Maroon 5 | 24,805 |
| August 15 | "Sugar" | Maroon 5 | 24,805 |
| August 22 | "Sugar" | Maroon 5 | 24,336 |
| August 29 | "Sugar" | Maroon 5 | 27,921 |
| September 5 | "Sugar" | Maroon 5 | 25,631 |
| September 12 | "Sugar" | Maroon 5 | 24,960 |
| September 19 | "Sugar" | Maroon 5 | 22,450 |
| September 26 | "Lost Stars" | Maroon 5 | 20,272 |
| October 3 | "Lost Stars" | Maroon 5 | 38,569 |
| October 10 | "Lost Stars" | Maroon 5 | 26,253 |
| October 17 | "Lost Stars" | Maroon 5 | 21,806 |
| October 24 | "Sugar" | Maroon 5 | 20,690 |
| October 31 | "Hello" | Adele | 87,840 |
| November 7 | "Hello" | Adele | 69,888 |
| November 14 | "Hello" | Adele | 95,020 |
| November 21 | "Hello" | Adele | 77,798 |
| November 28 | "Hello" | Adele | 68,489 |
| December 5 | "Hello" | Adele | 66,250 |
| December 12 | "Hello" | Adele | 46,701 |
| December 19 | "Hello" | Adele | 38,739 |
| December 26 | "Hello" | Adele | 36,170 |

== Monthly chart ==
| Month | Song | Artist | Total downloads |
|---|---|---|---|
| January | "Problem" | Ariana Grande featuring Iggy Azalea | 172,772 |
| February | "Sugar" | Maroon 5 | 148,484 |
| March | "Uptown Funk" | Mark Ronson featuring Bruno Mars | 165,424 |
| April | "Uptown Funk" | Mark Ronson featuring Bruno Mars | 149,825 |
| May | "Sugar" | Maroon 5 | 154,773 |
| June | "Sugar" | Maroon 5 | 135,237 |
| July | "Sugar" | Maroon 5 | 127,224 |
| August | "Sugar" | Maroon 5 | 129,354 |
| September | "Sugar" | Maroon 5 | 79,588 |
| October | "Lost Stars" | Adam Levine | 107,109 |
| November | "Hello" | Adele | 334,310 |
| December | "Hello" | Adele | 192,036 |

== Year-end chart ==
| Rank | Song | Artist(s) | Total Downloads |
|---|---|---|---|
| 1 | "Sugar" | Maroon 5 | 1,346,468 |
| 2 | "Uptown Funk" | Mark Ronson featuring Bruno Mars | 1,184,248 |
| 3 | "I'm Not the Only One" | Sam Smith | 1,089,735 |
| 4 | "Lost Stars" | Adam Levine | 966,659 |
| 5 | "Problem" | Ariana Grande featuring Iggy Azalea | 835,304 |
| 6 | "Hello" | Adele | 614,186 |
| 7 | "Maps" | Maroon 5 | 619,140 |
| 8 | "Treasure" | Bruno Mars | 516,889 |
| 9 | "See You Again" | Wiz Khalifa featuring Charlie Puth | 391,439 |
| 10 | "Thinking Out Loud" | Ed Sheeran | 406,331 |
