= List of number-one international songs of 2017 (South Korea) =

The international Gaon Digital Chart is a chart that ranks the best-performing international songs in South Korea. The data is collected by the Korea Music Content Association. Below is a list of songs that topped the weekly and monthly charts, as according to the Gaon 국외 (Foreign) Digital Chart. The Digital Chart ranks songs according to their performance on the Gaon Download, Streaming, and BGM charts.

== Weekly chart ==
Source: Gaon Digital Chart
Date	Song	Artist
January 7	"Hush"	Lasse Lindh
January 14	"Hush"	Lasse Lindh
January 21	"Hush"	Lasse Lindh
January 28	"Hush"	Lasse Lindh
February 4	"Hush"	Lasse Lindh
February 11	"Hush"	Lasse Lindh
February 18	"Hush"	Lasse Lindh
February 25	"Hush"	Lasse Lindh
March 4	"Shape of You"	Ed Sheeran
March 11	"Shape of You"	Ed Sheeran
March 18	"Shape of You"	Ed Sheeran
March 25	"Beauty and the Beast"	Ariana Grande and John Legend
April 1	"Shape of You"	Ed Sheeran
April 8	"Shape of You"	Ed Sheeran
April 15	"Shape of You"	Ed Sheeran
April 22	"Shape of You"	Ed Sheeran
April 29	"Shape of You"	Ed Sheeran
May 6	"Shape of You"	Ed Sheeran
May 13	"Shape of You"	Ed Sheeran
May 20	"Shape of You"	Ed Sheeran
May 27	"Shape of You"	Ed Sheeran
June 3	"Shape of You"	Ed Sheeran
June 10	"Shape of You"	Ed Sheeran
June 17	"Shape of You"	Ed Sheeran
June 24	"Shape of You"	Ed Sheeran
July 1	"Shape of You"	Ed Sheeran
July 8	"Shape of You"	Ed Sheeran
July 15	"Shape of You"	Ed Sheeran
July 22	"Shape of You"	Ed Sheeran
July 29	"Shape of You"	Ed Sheeran
August 5	"Shape of You"	Ed Sheeran
August 12	"Shape of You"	Ed Sheeran
August 19	"Shape of You"	Ed Sheeran
August 26	"Shape of You"	Ed Sheeran
September 2	"Shape of You"	Ed Sheeran
September 9	"Shape of You"	Ed Sheeran
September 16	"Shape of You"	Ed Sheeran
September 23	"Shape of You"	Ed Sheeran
September 30	"Shape of You"	Ed Sheeran
October 7	"Shape of You"	Ed Sheeran
October 14	"Shape of You"	Ed Sheeran
October 21	"Shape of You"	Ed Sheeran
October 28	"Shape of You"	Ed Sheeran
November 4	"Shape of You"	Ed Sheeran
November 11	"Shape of You"	Ed Sheeran
November 18	"Shape of You"	Ed Sheeran
November 25	"Shape of You"	Ed Sheeran
December 2	"There's Nothing Holdin' Me Back"	Shawn Mendes
December 9	"There's Nothing Holdin' Me Back"	Shawn Mendes
December 16	"Santa Tell Me"	Ariana Grande
December 23	"Santa Tell Me"	Ariana Grande
December 30	"Santa Tell Me"	Ariana Grande

== Monthly charts ==
Month	Song	Artist(s)	Downloads – Streams
January	"Hush"	Lasse Lindh	184,264 – 9,967,320
February	"Hush"	Lasse Lindh	105,230 – 6,265,459
March	"Shape of You"	Ed Sheeran	137,454 – 6,058,067
April	"Shape of You"	Ed Sheeran	165,643 – 9,297,284
May	"Shape of You"	Ed Sheeran	257,281 – 15,454,582
June	"Shape of You"	Ed Sheeran	247,333 – 18,975,658
July	"Shape of You"	Ed Sheeran	202,965 – 16,175,499
August	"Shape of You"	Ed Sheeran	177,832 – 12,184,429
September	"Shape of You"	Ed Sheeran	168,749 – 11,257,937
October	"Shape of You"	Ed Sheeran	153,854 – 10,473,096
November	"Shape of You"	Ed Sheeran	127,971 – 9,261,060
December	"Santa Tell Me"	Ariana Grande	214,330 – 10,477,212
