= List of number-one international songs of 2013 (South Korea) =

The international Gaon Digital Chart is a chart that ranks the best-performing international songs in South Korea. The data is collected by the Korea Music Content Association. Below is a list of songs that topped the weekly, monthly, and yearly charts, as according to the Gaon 국외 (Foreign) Digital Chart. The Digital Chart ranks songs according to their performance on the Gaon Streaming, Download, BGM, and Mobile charts.

== Weekly charts ==
Date	Song	Artist	Total downloads
January 5	"One Day More"	Les Misérables Cast	38,411
January 12	"Call Me Maybe"	Carly Rae Jepsen	40,141
January 19	"Call Me Maybe"	Carly Rae Jepsen	46,028
January 26	"Call Me Maybe"	Carly Rae Jepsen	84,450
February 2	"Call Me Maybe"	Carly Rae Jepsen	59,344
February 9	"Call Me Maybe"	Carly Rae Jepsen	54,924
February 16	"Call Me Maybe"	Carly Rae Jepsen	50,178
February 23	"Call Me Maybe"	Carly Rae Jepsen	41,184
March 2	"Call Me Maybe"	Carly Rae Jepsen	43,565
March 9	"Call Me Maybe"	Carly Rae Jepsen	37,718
March 16	"Call Me Maybe"	Carly Rae Jepsen	33,660
March 23	"Call Me Maybe"	Carly Rae Jepsen	33,095
March 30	"Call Me Maybe"	Carly Rae Jepsen	29,685
April 6	"Call Me Maybe"	Carly Rae Jepsen	28,361
April 13	"Call Me Maybe"	Carly Rae Jepsen	26,164
April 20	"Call Me Maybe"	Carly Rae Jepsen	25,574
April 27	"Call Me Maybe"	Carly Rae Jepsen	18,649
May 4	"Call Me Maybe"	Carly Rae Jepsen	19,356
May 11	"Call Me Maybe"	Carly Rae Jepsen	18,194
May 18	"Call Me Maybe"	Carly Rae Jepsen	17,923
May 25	"Lose Yourself to Dance"	Daft Punk featuring Pharrell Williams	35,088
June 1	"Take a Picture"	Carly Rae Jepsen	35,704
June 8	"The Bad Touch (Gordon & Doyle Edit)"	Gollum	20,216
June 15	"The Bad Touch (Gordon & Doyle Edit)"	Gollum	22,477
June 22	"The Bad Touch (Gordon & Doyle Edit)"	Gollum	22,592
June 29	"Ooh La La"	Britney Spears	18,825
July 6	"The Bad Touch (Gordon & Doyle Edit)"	Gollum	22,685
July 13	"Holy Grail"	Jay-Z featuring Justin Timberlake	24,621
July 20	"The Bad Touch (Gordon & Doyle Edit)"	Gollum	19,967
July 27	"The Bad Touch (Gordon & Doyle Edit)"	Gollum	20,474
August 3	"The Bad Touch (Gordon & Doyle Edit)"	Gollum	21,596
August 10	"The Bad Touch (Gordon & Doyle Edit)"	Gollum	21,364
August 17	"Roar"	Katy Perry	25,846
August 24	"Applause"	Lady GaGa	25,682
August 31	"Berzerk"	Eminem	32,111
September 7	"Rock n Roll" (explicit version)	Avril Lavigne	23,153
September 14	"The Bad Touch (Gordon & Doyle Edit)"	Gollum	17,095
September 21	"The Bad Touch (Gordon & Doyle Edit)"	Gollum	18,035
September 28	"The Fox"	Ylvis	22,998
October 5	"The Fox"	Ylvis	28,356
October 12	"Bubble Butt"	Major Lazer featuring Bruno Mars, GD, TOP, Tyga, Mystic	28,701
October 19	"The Fox"	Ylvis	27,690
October 26	"The Fox"	Ylvis	30,114
November 2	"The Monster"	Eminem featuring Rihanna	32,893
November 9	"The Monster"	Eminem featuring Rihanna	26,913
November 16	"The Fox"	Ylvis	20,916
November 23	"The Fox"	Ylvis	29,166
November 30	"The Fox"	Ylvis	38,558
December 7	"Miracles in December" (Chinese: 十二月的奇迹)	EXO	29,866
December 14	"The First Snow" (Chinese: 初雪)	EXO	27,157
December 21	"Pillow Talk"	Jeff Bernat	40,674
December 28	"All I Want for Christmas Is You"	Mariah Carey	31,713

== Monthly charts ==
Month	Song	Artist	Total Downloads
January	"Call Me Maybe"	Carly Rae Jepsen	234,681
February	"Call Me Maybe"	Carly Rae Jepsen	194,360
March	"Call Me Maybe"	Carly Rae Jepsen	150,648
April	"Call Me Maybe"	Carly Rae Jepsen	103,001
May	"Call Me Maybe"	Carly Rae Jepsen	77,126
June	"The Bad Touch"	Gollum	94,010
July	"The Bad Touch"	Gollum	92,865
August	"The Bad Touch"	Gollum	93,680
September	"The Bad Touch"	Gollum	77,710
October	"The Fox"	Ylvis	124,959
November	"The Fox"	Ylvis	123,015
December	"All I Want for Christmas Is You"	Mariah Carey	125,655

== Year-end chart ==
Rank	Song	Artist(s)	Total Downloads
1	"Call Me Maybe"	Carly Rae Jepsen	1,012,893
2	"Call You Mine"	Jeff Bernat featuring Geologic	520,866
3	"The Bad Touch"	Gollum	564,827
4	"Groovin"	Jeff Bernat	372,568
5	"Someone Like You"	Adele	385,416
6	"Young Girls"	Bruno Mars	327,500
7	"The Fox"	Ylvis	403,294
8	"Payphone"	Maroon 5 featuring Wiz Khalifa	353,259
9	"Tears Always Win"	Alicia Keys	285,213
10	"Get Up (Rattle)"	Bingo Players	307,693
