= List of number-one international songs of 2016 (South Korea) =

The international Gaon Digital Chart is a chart that ranks the best-performing international songs in South Korea. The data is collected by the Korea Music Content Association. Below is a list of songs that topped the weekly and monthly charts, as according to the Gaon 국외 (Foreign) Digital Chart. The Digital Chart ranks songs according to their performance on the Gaon Download, Streaming, and BGM charts.

== Weekly chart ==
Source: Gaon Digital Chart
Date	Song	Artist	Total downloads
January 2	"Hello"	Adele	37,202
January 9	"Hello"	Adele	46,671
January 16	"Hello"	Adele	39,147
January 23	"Hello"	Adele	34,491
January 30	"Hello"	Adele	33,903
February 6	"Hello"	Adele	33,956
February 13	"Hello"	Adele	29,977
February 20	"Hello"	Adele	27,732
February 27	"Hello"	Adele	26,386
March 5	"Hello"	Adele	26,364
March 12	"Bang Bang"	Jessie J, Ariana Grande and Nicki Minaj	49,907
March 19	"Bang Bang"	Jessie J, Ariana Grande and Nicki Minaj	48,684
March 26	"Bang Bang"	Jessie J, Ariana Grande and Nicki Minaj	41,086
April 2	"Bang Bang"	Jessie J, Ariana Grande and Nicki Minaj	34,701
April 9	"Bang Bang"	Jessie J, Ariana Grande and Nicki Minaj	31,489
April 16	"Bang Bang"	Jessie J, Ariana Grande and Nicki Minaj	29,406
April 23	"Bang Bang"	Jessie J, Ariana Grande and Nicki Minaj	26,861
April 30	"Bang Bang"	Jessie J, Ariana Grande and Nicki Minaj	26,367
May 7	"Bang Bang"	Jessie J, Ariana Grande and Nicki Minaj	25,531
May 14	"Bang Bang"	Jessie J, Ariana Grande and Nicki Minaj	23,179
May 21	"Love Yourself"	Justin Bieber	22,890
May 28	"Love Yourself"	Justin Bieber	22,893
June 4	"Love Yourself"	Justin Bieber	20,937
June 11	"Love Yourself"	Justin Bieber	19,674
June 18	"Love Yourself"	Justin Bieber	18,312
June 25	"Love Yourself"	Justin Bieber	17,942
July 2	"Love Yourself"	Justin Bieber	19,607
July 9	"Love Yourself"	Justin Bieber	19,530
July 16	"Love Yourself"	Justin Bieber	17,760
July 23	"Love Yourself"	Justin Bieber	17,170
July 30	"Love Yourself"	Justin Bieber	15,308
August 6	"Love Yourself"	Justin Bieber	16,120
August 13	"Love Yourself"	Justin Bieber	12,379
August 20	"Love Yourself"	Justin Bieber	17,382
August 27	"Love Yourself"	Justin Bieber	18,422
September 3	"Love Yourself"	Justin Bieber	18,861
September 10	"Love Yourself"	Justin Bieber	17,447
September 17	"Love Yourself"	Justin Bieber	16,572
September 24	"Love Yourself"	Justin Bieber	15,648
October 1	"Love Yourself"	Justin Bieber	18,086
October 8	"I'm Not the Only One"	Sam Smith	18,370
October 15	"Don't Wanna Know"	Maroon 5 featuring Kendrick Lamar	51,694
October 22	"Don't Wanna Know"	Maroon 5 featuring Kendrick Lamar	69,810
October 29	"Don't Wanna Know"	Maroon 5 featuring Kendrick Lamar	40,758
November 5	"Don't Wanna Know"	Maroon 5 featuring Kendrick Lamar	30,275
November 12	"Don't Wanna Know"	Maroon 5 featuring Kendrick Lamar	24,887
November 19	"Don't Wanna Know"	Maroon 5 featuring Kendrick Lamar	24,599
November 26	"Don't Wanna Know"	Maroon 5 featuring Kendrick Lamar	25,027
December 3	"Don't Wanna Know"	Maroon 5 featuring Kendrick Lamar	24,923
December 10	"Santa Tell Me"	Ariana Grande	29,208
December 17	"Hush"	Lasse Lindh	153,068
December 24	"Hush"	Lasse Lindh	74,317
December 31	"Hush"	Lasse Lindh	51,562

== Monthly charts ==
Source: Gaon Monthly Digital Chart
Month	Song	Artist	Total Downloads	Ref
January	"Hello"	Adele	169,825	
February	"Hello"	Adele	120,056	
March	"Bang Bang"	Jessie J, Ariana Grande and Nicki Minaj	179,973	
April	"Bang Bang"	Jessie J, Ariana Grande and Nicki Minaj	124,484	
May	"Love Yourself"	Justin Bieber	101,022	
June	"Love Yourself"	Justin Bieber	80,781	
July	"Love Yourself"	Justin Bieber	78,353	
August	"Love Yourself"	Justin Bieber	72,689	
September	"Love Yourself"	Justin Bieber	73,142	
October	"Don't Wanna Know"	Maroon 5 featuring Kendrick Lamar	172,190	
November	"Don't Wanna Know"	Maroon 5 featuring Kendrick Lamar	109,652	
December	"Hush"	Lasse Lindh	300,616	

== Year-end chart ==
Rank	Song	Artist(s)	Total Downloads
1	"I'm Not the Only One"	Sam Smith	969,207
2	"Love Yourself"	Justin Bieber	962,780
3	"Hello"	Adele	821,942
4	"Bang Bang"	Jessie J, Ariana Grande and Nicki Minaj	707,592
5	"Sugar"	Maroon 5	606,307
6	"One Call Away"	Charlie Puth	526,715
7	"I'm Not Sorry"	Dean featuring Eric Bellinger	399,898
8	"Lost Stars"	Adam Levine	470,754
9	"Don't Wanna Know"	Maroon 5 featuring Kendrick Lamar	374,226
10	"Uptown Funk"	Mark Ronson featuring Bruno Mars	422,403
