= MBC Sports+ =

- Country: South Korea
- Broadcast area: South Korea
- Headquarters: Seoul

Programming
- Language: Korean
- Picture format: 1080i HDTV (downscaled to 16:9 480i for the SDTV feed)

Ownership
- Owner: MBC Plus Media

History
- Launched: MBC Sports+: November 2001; MBC Sports+ 2: March 28, 2016
- Replaced: MBC Sports+ 2: MBC QueeN
- Closed: MBC Sports+ 2: February 18, 2019
- Replaced by: MBC Sports+ 2: MBC On
- Former names: MBC Sports+: MBC Sports Channel (2001); MBC ESPN (2001-2010)

Links
- Website: www.mbcsportsplus.com

MBC Sports+ (MBC 스포츠+, 엠비씨 스포츠 플러스) is a South Korean pay television network, which is well known for its sports broadcasting.

== Contents ==
This is one of the Korean pay television channels that specialise in broadcasting sports. It is a subsidiary of the MBC Plus. MBC Sports+ 2 was created in 2016 following the acquisition of Major League Baseball rights, due to the rising number of Korean players in the league.

MBC Sports+ broadcast the National Football League from 2024.

== See also ==
- KBS N Sports
- SBS Sports
- JTBC Sports
- SPOTV
