= List of Circle Digital Chart number ones of 2026 =

The Circle Digital Chart is a chart that ranks the best-performing singles in South Korea. Managed by the domestic Ministry of Culture, Sports and Tourism (MCST), its data is compiled by the Korea Music Content Industry Association and published by the Circle Chart. The ranking is based collectively on each single's download sales, stream count, and background music use. The Circle Chart provides weekly (listed from Sunday to Saturday), monthly, and yearly lists for the chart.

== Weekly charts ==
List of number-one songs on the weekly Circle Digital Chart in 2026
| Week ending date | Song | Artist(s) | Ref. |
|---|---|---|---|
| January 3 | "Good Goodbye" | Hwasa | |
| January 10 | "Good Goodbye" | Hwasa | |
| January 17 | "Good Goodbye" | Hwasa | |
| January 24 | "Good Goodbye" | Hwasa | |
| January 31 | "My Whole World" (그대 작은 나의 세상이 되어) | Car, the Garden | |
| February 7 | "My Whole World" (그대 작은 나의 세상이 되어) | Car, the Garden | |
| February 14 | "404 (New Era)" | KiiiKiii | |
| February 21 | "404 (New Era)" | KiiiKiii | |
| February 28 | "404 (New Era)" | KiiiKiii | |
| March 7 | "404 (New Era)" | KiiiKiii | |
| March 14 | "Rude!" | Hearts2Hearts | |
| March 21 | "Rude!" | Hearts2Hearts | |
| March 28 | "Swim" | BTS | |
| April 4 | "Rude!" | Hearts2Hearts | |
| April 11 | "Joy, Sorrow, a Beautiful Heart" (기쁨, 슬픔, 아름다운 마음) | AKMU | |
| April 18 | "Joy, Sorrow, a Beautiful Heart" (기쁨, 슬픔, 아름다운 마음) | AKMU | |
| April 25 | "Paradise of Rumors" (소문의 낙원) | AKMU | |
| May 2 | "Paradise of Rumors" (소문의 낙원) | AKMU | |
| May 9 | "Paradise of Rumors" (소문의 낙원) | AKMU | |
| May 16 | "Paradise of Rumors" (소문의 낙원) | AKMU | |
| May 23 | "RedRed" | Cortis | |
| May 30 | "RedRed" | Cortis | |
| June 6 | "Suddenly" (갑자기) | I.O.I | |
| June 13 | "Suddenly" (갑자기) | I.O.I | |
| June 20 | "Suddenly" (갑자기) | I.O.I | |
| June 27 | "RedRed" | Cortis | |
| July 4 | "RedRed" | Cortis | |
| July 11 | "RedRed" | Cortis | |
| July 18 | "Love Attack" | Rescene | |
| July 25 | "Love Attack" | Rescene | |
| August 1 | "Love Attack" | Rescene | |
| August 8 | "Love Attack" | Rescene | |
| August 15 | "Love Attack" | Rescene | |
| August 22 | "Love Attack" | Rescene | |
| August 29 | "Blingy" | NCT 127 | |
| September 5 | "Float" | Taemin | |
| September 12 | "ToTo" (또또} | Lim Young-woong | |
| September 19 | "Love Attack" | Rescene | |
| September 26 | "I'm Gonna Toesa" (퇴사할게여) | Soyeon featuring Kian84 | |
| October 3 | "I'm Gonna Toesa" (퇴사할게여) | Soyeon featuring Kian84 | |
| October 10 | "Tic Tac Toe" | Onew and Zico | |
| October 17 | "Neon" | A2O Lite | |
| October 24 | "Neon" | A2O Lite | |
| October 31 | "Neon" | A2O Lite | |
| November 7 | "Neon" | A2O Lite | |
| November 14 | "With" | Rescene | |

== Monthly charts ==
List of number-one songs on the monthly Circle Digital Chart in 2026
| Month | Song | Artist(s) | Ref. |
|---|---|---|---|
| January | "Good Goodbye" | Hwasa | |
| February | "404 (New Era)" | KiiiKiii | |
| March | "Rude!" | Hearts2Hearts | |
| April | "Joy, Sorrow, a Beautiful Heart" (기쁨, 슬픔, 아름다운 마음) | AKMU | |
| May | "Paradise of Rumors" (소문의 낙원) | AKMU | |
| June | "Suddenly" (갑자기) | I.O.I | |
| July | "RedRed" | Cortis | |
| August | "Love Attack" | Rescene | |
| September | "Love Attack" | Rescene | |
| October | "Neon" | A2O Lite | |
