= The Decade (Day6 album) =

Studio album by Day6
- Released: September 5, 2025
- Genre: Pop rock; K-pop
- Length: 32:24
- Language: Korean
- Label: JYP Entertainment; Studio J

Day6 chronology
Band Aid (2024)	The Decade (2025)

Singles from The Decade
- 1. "Dream Bus" Released: September 5, 2025; 2. "Inside Out" Released: September 5, 2025

Music videos
- "Dream Bus" on YouTube
- "Inside Out" on YouTube

The Decade (stylized as The DECADE) is the fourth Korean-language studio album by South Korean band Day6. It was released by JYP Entertainment on September 5, 2025. The singles, "Dream Bus" and "Inside Out" were released the same day.

== Background and release ==
On August 4, 2025, it was reported that Day6 would be celebrating their 10th anniversary with a new studio album and a concert. The group also unveiled the name of their fourth Korean studio album, "The Decade", during the announcement.

== Track listing ==
All tracks are arranged by Hong Ji-sang.

The Decade track listing
No.	Title	Lyrics	Music	Length
1.	"Dream Bus" (꿈의 버스)	Young K; Hong Ji-sang	Sungjin; Young K; Wonpil; Hong Ji-sang	2:41
2.	"Inside Out"	Young K	Sungjin; Young K; Wonpil; Hong Ji-sang	3:00
3.	"Sun, Stay Asleep" (해야 뜨지 말아 줘)	Young K	Sungjin; Young K; Wonpil; Hong Ji-sang	3:13
4.	"Disco Day"	Young K; Hong Ji-sang	Young K; Wonpil; Hong Ji-sang	3:06
5.	"My Way"	Young K	Young K; Wonpil; Hong Ji-sang	3:12
6.	"Before the Stars" (별들 앞에서)	Young K; Hong Ji-sang	Sungjin; Hong Ji-sang	3:43
7.	"Take All My Heart"	Young K; Wonpil; Hong Ji-sang	Sungjin; Young K; Wonpil; Hong Ji-sang	3:23
8.	"Dream Rider" (날아라! 드림라이더)	Young K; Wonpil; Hong Ji-sang	Young K; Wonpil; Hong Ji-sang	3:04
9.	"So It's the End" (드디어 끝나갑니다)	Young K	Sungjin; Young K; Wonpil; Hong Ji-sang	3:02
10.	"Our Season" (우리의 계절)	Young K	Young K; Wonpil; Hong Ji-sang	3:56
Total length:				32:24

== Charts ==
=== Weekly charts ===
Weekly chart performance for The Decade
Chart (2025)	Peak position
Japanese Western Albums (Oricon)	24
Japanese Download Albums (Billboard Japan)	82
South Korean Albums (Circle)	7

=== Monthly charts ===
Monthly chart performance for The Decade
Chart (2025)	Position
South Korean Albums (Circle)	13

== Release history ==
Region	Date	Format	Label
Various	September 5, 2025	CD; digital download; streaming	JYP; Studio J
