= Zutter =

Zutter is a German family name. It is possibly, like the Flemish name DeSutter, derived from the Latin word sutor (shoemaker). It may refer to the following people:

- Louis Zutter (1865–1946), Swiss gymnast
- Adolf Zutter (1889–1947), German SS concentration camp officer executed for war crimes
- Albrecht Zutter (1940-), German publisher
- Kristof De Zutter (1982-), Belgian cyclist

== See also ==
- Zutter (song) (pronounced "Jollo", "awesome") Korean-language song 2015
