= MBC Plus =

Multimedia company

- Type: Private
- Industry: Media
- Founded: September 22, 1993
- Headquarters: Seoul, South Korea
- Key people: Neunghee Cho, CEO
- Products: Television (Non Free-to-air channels)
- Owner: Munhwa Broadcasting Corporation
- Parent: Munhwa Broadcasting Corporation
- Website: mbcplus.com

MBC Plus (Korean: MBC 플러스; 엠비씨 플러스) is a South Korean company under MBC, producing media, broadcast and telecommunication products for non free-to-air networks, including Skylife and 'Cable TV' (KCTA) service providers. Corporate slogan is "Let's plus!".

== Television networks ==
- MBC Dramanet (also known as MBC Drama) - for drama and entertainment programs.
- MBC Sports+ - for sports (both professionals and amateurs).
- MBC every1 - Entertainment channel for both Variety Programs. (Formerly MBC Movies)
- MBC M - for Music. (Formerly MBC Game and MBC Music)
- MBC On - for Classic MBC Shows. (Formerly MBC Sports+ 2)

Former networks

- MBC Game - for E-sport (online game, especially for youth). (Formerly LOOK TV and GEMBC)
- MBC Life - Documentary channel for life cultures. (Formerly Alice TV)
- MBC QueeN - mostly organizes program for women. (Formerly MBC Life)
- MBC Sports+ 2 - for sports (both professionals and amateurs). (Formerly MBC QueeN)

== Other properties ==
- Idol Champ - a fan engagement mobile application co-created with Neowiz.

== See also ==
- Economy of South Korea
- List of South Korean companies
- Communications in South Korea

== Programs with MBC & MBC plus media ==
- Real Man (Korean: 진짜 사나이) - MBC
- Dad! Where are you going? (Korean: 아빠! 어디가?) - MBC
- We Got Married - MBC
