= MBC Life =

South Korean television channel

- Country: South Korea
- Broadcast area: South Korea
- Headquarters: Seoul, South Korea

Programming
- Language(s): Korean
- Picture format: 480i (SDTV)

Ownership
- Owner: MBC Plus Media

History
- Launched: October 10, 2005
- Closed: December 31, 2012
- Replaced by: MBC QueeN
- Former names: Alice TV (October 10, 2005 - October 4, 2009)

MBC Life (formerly known as Alice TV) was a South Korean non-'free-to-air' television network, which aired programming documentary for life cultures.

== History ==
In September 2009, MBC acquired Alice TV, at a time when MBC and SBS were buying several cable networks. The relaunched channel started on 5 October 2009 at 11am.

== Contents ==
This is one of the Korean cable television channels that specialize in broadcasting documentary-related life cultures. Was a subsidiary of the MBC Plus Media. The channel aired documentary content from the main terrestrial networks, as well as foreign content coming in from the BBC, CCTV and NHK. In early 2010, it aired Paper Life, a six-part series on the history of paper.
