= MBC QueeN =

South Korean television channel

- Country: South Korea
- Broadcast area: South Korea
- Headquarters: Seoul, South Korea

Programming
- Language: Korean
- Picture format: 480i (SDTV); 1080i (HDTV)

Ownership
- Owner: MBC Plus Media

History
- Launched: January 1, 2013
- Replaced: MBC Life
- Closed: March 27, 2016
- Replaced by: MBC Sports+ 2

MBC QueeN was a South Korean cable and satellite television network, which aired programming aimed at women. The channel's slogan was What Women Want.

The channel broadcast beauty, fashion, entertainment and drama content. The channel's launch personality was Kim Nam-joo; the goal was to make the channel "the queen of women's channels".

In February 2016, MBC announced the replacement of the channel with a new sports channel, coming in after MBC Plus bought rights to air MLB matches due to the increasing number of Korean players in the league.
