= Power (G-Dragon song) =

Single by G-Dragon

from the album Übermensch
- Language: English; Korean
- Released: October 31, 2024
- Genre: K-hip-hop
- Length: 2:23
- Label: Galaxy; Empire
- Composers: Tommy Brown; Theron Thomas; Steven Franks
- Lyricist: Kwon Ji-yong
- Producers: G-Dragon; Tommy Brown; Theron Thomas

G-Dragon singles chronology
"Untitled, 2014" (2017)	"Power" (2024)	"Home Sweet Home" (2024)

Music video
- "Power" on YouTube

"Power" is a song by South Korean rapper G-Dragon. It was released through Galaxy Corporation and Empire on October 31, 2024, as the first & lead single from his now third studio album, Übermensch (2025). His first release in over seven years and his first release since departing from YG Entertainment in 2023, "Power" was written by G-Dragon whilst production was handled by himself, Tommy Brown, Theron Thomas and Steven Franks.

== Background and composition ==
On October 30, 2024, G-Dragon unveiled a promotional clip featuring "Power" as background music, and previewed the full song during a livestream on Instagram. During the broadcast of You Quiz on the Block that was aired the same day, G-Dragon commented, "'Power' is a song about strength. For me, strength is 'music.' During my seven-year hiatus, I realized the incredible influence of media as a third-party observer. This song satirizes the power of media and conveys a desire to blend various forms of strength harmoniously." The song was released under a partnership with his agency Galaxy Corporation, and Empire Distribution the following day.

== Music video and promotion ==
On October 8, it was reported that G-Dragon had begun filming the music video for his upcoming single. The video features a continuous, single-take shot of G-Dragon moving through different sets, such as a television station, a construction site, a newsroom, and a subway train.

G-Dragon performed at the 2024 MAMA Awards in November 2024 along with his fellow BigBang members Taeyang and Daesung

== Accolades ==
Awards and nominations for "Power"
Ceremony	Year	Category	Result	Ref.
Asian Pop Music Awards	2024	Song of the Year (Overseas)	Won	
Asian Pop Music Awards	2024	Top 20 Songs of the Year (Overseas)	Won	
Korean Music Awards	2025	Best Rap/Hip-hop Song	Won	

== Credits and personnel ==
Credits adapted from Melon.

- G-Dragon – vocals, lyricist, composer
- Tommy "TB Hits" Brown – composer, arranger
- Theron Thomas – composer
- Steven Franks – composer, arranger

== Charts ==
=== Weekly charts ===
Weekly chart performance
Chart (2024)	Peak position
Global 200 (Billboard)	29
Hong Kong (Billboard)	11
Japan (Japan Hot 100)	88
Japan Digital Singles (Oricon)	24
Malaysia (Billboard)	8
New Zealand Hot Singles (RMNZ)	9
Singapore (RIAS)	16
South Korea (Circle)	3
Taiwan (Billboard)	11
UK Singles Downloads (Official Charts)	23
UK Singles Sales (OCC)	23

=== Monthly charts ===
Monthly chart performance
Chart (2024)	Position
South Korea (Circle)	3

=== Year-end charts ===
Year-end chart performance
Chart	Year	Position
South Korea (Circle)	2024	103
South Korea (Circle)	2025	34

== Release history ==
Release formats for "Power"
Region	Date	Format	Label	Ref.
Various	October 31, 2024	Digital download; streaming	Galaxy; Empire	
