= Circle Digital Chart =

South Korean music singles chart

The Circle Digital Chart, previously known as the Gaon Digital Chart, is the music industry standard record chart ranking the 200 most popular singles in South Korea. It provides rankings on a weekly, monthly, and yearly basis, which is based on an aggregate of streaming, downloads, and background music from major South Korean music platforms, as well as video ringback tone sales from the V Coloring app. It is a part of the Circle Chart, previously known as the Gaon Chart.

== History ==
The Gaon Digital Chart was launched as a part of the Gaon Chart in February 2010, by the Korea Music Content Association and South Korea's Ministry of Culture, Sports and Tourism. It started with compiling data from six major South Korean music platforms: Melon, Dosirak, Mnet.com, Bugs, Cyworld, and Soribada.

Spotify Korea was included in the chart starting in December 2021. Apple Music Korea was included from chart starting July 2022. In July 2022, Gaon Chart was rebranded as the Circle Chart. As of 2024, it compiles data from Apple Music, Spotify, Melon, Bugs, Vibe, Genie, Flo, Samsung Music, and V Coloring.

In August 2023, the Korea Music Content Association announced that Circle Chart will no longer include muted music streams, which accounted for over 7% of weekly domestic streaming, in its chart data.

== Number-one singles ==
- 2010
- 2011
- 2012
- 2013
- 2014
- 2015
- 2016
- 2017
- 2018
- 2019
- 2020
- 2021
- 2022
- 2023
- 2024
- 2025
- 2026

International chart

- 2011
- 2012
- 2013
- 2014
- 2015
- 2016
- 2017
- 2018

== Best-performing singles ==
2010

Yearly Top 10 Best-Charting Songs
#	Song	Artist	Label
1	"Bad Girl Good Girl"	Miss A	JYP Entertainment
2	"Nagging"	IU & Seulong	LOEN Entertainment
3	"Sick Enough to Die"	MC Mong	IS Entermedia Group
4	"Go Away"	2NE1	YG Entertainment
5	"Oh!"	Girls' Generation	SM Entertainment
6	"2 Different Tears"	Wonder Girls	JYP Entertainment
7	"Still Eating Well"	Homme	Big Hit Entertainment & LOEN Entertainment
8	"Then Then Then"	Supreme Team	Amoeba Culture
9	"Confession"	Hot Potato	Daeum Entertainment
10	"Hoot"	Girls' Generation	SM Entertainment

2011

Yearly Top 10 Best-Charting Songs
#	Song	Artist	Label
1	"Roly Poly"	T-ara	Core Contents Media
2	"Having An Affair"	Park Myung-soo & G-Dragon feat. Park Bom	MBC
3	"Please"	Kim Bum-soo	MBC
4	"Lonely"	2NE1	YG Entertainment
5	"Don't Cry"	Park Bom	YG Entertainment
6	"Pinocchio (Danger)"	f(x)	SM Entertainment
7	"I Am the Best"	2NE1	YG Entertainment
8	"Tonight"	BigBang	YG Entertainment
9	"On Rainy Days"	Beast	Cube Entertainment
10	"A Story Only I Didn't Know"	IU	LOEN Entertainment

2012

Yearly Top 10 Best-Charting Songs
#	Song	Artist	Label
1	"Gangnam Style"	Psy	YG Entertainment
2	"Cherry Blossom Ending"	Busker Busker	CJ E&M Music
3	"Alone"	Sistar	Starship Entertainment
4	"Loving U"	Sistar	Starship Entertainment
5	"Fantastic Baby"	BigBang	YG Entertainment
6	"I Love You"	2NE1	YG Entertainment
7	"Lovey-Dovey"	T-ara	Core Contents Media
8	"All For You"	Jung Eun-ji & Seo In-guk	Jellyfish Entertainment & A Cube Entertainment
9	"Heaven"	Ailee	YMC Entertainment
10	"Blue"	BigBang	YG Entertainment

2013

Yearly Top 10 Best-Charting Songs
#	Song	Artist	Label
1	"Gentleman"	Psy	YG Entertainment
2	"Shower of Tears"	Baechigi feat. Ailee	YMC Entertainment
3	"Gone Not Around Any Longer"	Sistar19	Starship Entertainment
4	"Bom Bom Bom"	Roy Kim	CJ E&M
5	"Tears"	Leessang feat. Yoojin	Jungle Entertainment
6	"What's Your Name?"	4Minute	Cube Entertainment
7	"Monodrama"	Huh Gak feat. Yoo Seung-woo	Cube Entertainment
8	"Turtle"	Davichi	Core Contents Media
9	"Give It to Me"	Sistar	Starship Entertainment
10	"Be Warmed"	Davichi	Core Contents Media

2014

Yearly Top 10 Best-Charting Songs
#	Song	Artist	Label
1	"Some"	Soyou, Junggigo feat. Lil Boi	Starship Entertainment
2	"Eyes, Nose, Lips"	Taeyang	YG Entertainment
3	"Wild Flower"	Park Hyo-shin	Jellyfish Entertainment
4	"A Midsummer Night's Sweetness"	San E & Raina	Pledis Entertainment
5	"The Meaning of You"	IU feat. Kim Chang-wan	LOEN Entertainment
6	"Your Scent"	Gary feat. Jung-in	Jungle Entertainment
7	"Not Spring, Love or Cherry Blossoms"	High4 feat. IU	LOEN Entertainment
8	"Mr. Chu (On Stage)"	Apink	A Cube Entertainment
9	"200%"	AKMU	YG Entertainment
10	"Friday"	IU feat. Yijeong	LOEN Entertainment

2015

Yearly Top 10 Best-Charting Songs
#	Song	Artist	Label
1	"Bang Bang Bang"	BigBang	YG Entertainment
2	"Loser"	BigBang	YG Entertainment
3	"Living in the Same Time"	Naul	CJ E&M Music
4	"Bae Bae"	BigBang	YG Entertainment
5	"Eat"	Zion.T	Amoeba Culture
6	"Shouldn't Have"	Baek A-yeon feat. Young K	JYP Entertainment
7	"Call Me Baby"	Exo	SM Entertainment
8	"Wi Ing Wi Ing"	Hyukoh	Cashmier Record
9	"Sugar"	Maroon 5	Interscope
10	"Leon"	Park Myung-soo feat. IU	MBC Entertainment

2016

Yearly Top 10 Best-Charting Songs
#	Song	Artist	Label
1	"Cheer Up"	Twice	JYP Entertainment
2	"Anywhere"	MC the Max	325 E&C
3	"Rough"	GFriend	Source Music
4	"This Love"	Davichi	Music&NEW
5	"I Don't Love You"	Urban Zakapa	MakeUs Entertainment
6	"You Are My Everything"	Gummy	Music&NEW
7	"I Am You, You Are Me"	Zico	Seven Seasons
8	"Making a New Ending for This Story"	Han Dong-geun	Pledis Entertainment
9	"The Love I Committed"	Im Chang-jung	NH Media
10	"Always"	Yoon Mi-rae	Music&NEW

2017

Yearly Top 10 Best-Charting Songs
#	Song	Artist	Label
1	"I Will Go to You Like the First Snow"	Ailee	YMC Entertainment
2	"Through the Night"	IU	LOEN Entertainment
3	"Like It"	Yoon Jong-shin	CJ E&M Music
4	"Shape of You"	Ed Sheeran	Warner Records
5	"You, Clouds, Rain"	Heize feat. Shin Yong-jae	CJ E&M
6	"Tell Me You Love Me"	Bolbbalgan4	Shofar Music
7	"Palette"	IU feat. G-Dragon	LOEN Entertainment
8	"Knock Knock"	Twice	JYP Entertainment
9	"Last Goodbye"	AKMU	YG Entertainment
10	"Really Really"	Winner	YG Entertainment

2018

Yearly Top 10 Best-Charting Songs
#	Song	Artist	Label	Aggregate points
1	"Love Scenario"	iKon	YG Entertainment	1,232,928,610
2	"Good Old Days"	Jang Deok Cheol	Limez Entertainment	1,140,111,375
3	"Every Day, Every Moment"	Paul Kim	SM Entertainment	1,006,784,017
4	"Bboom Bboom"	Momoland	MLD Entertainment	968,978,861
5	"Ddu-Du Ddu-Du"	Blackpink	YG Entertainment	940,214,913
6	"Pass By"	Nilo	PurplePine Entertainment	939,050,840
7	"Gift"	MeloMance	Heaven Company	915,842,576
8	"Way Back Home"	Shaun	DCTOM Entertainment	877,004,722
9	"Only Then"	Roy Kim	MMO Entertainment	870,444,304
10	"Travel"	Bolbbalgan4	Shofar Music	861,213,547

2019

Yearly Top 10 Best-Charting Songs
#	Song	Artist	Label	Aggregate points
1	"2002"	Anne-Marie	Warner Records	1,053,371,198
2	"If There Was Practice in Love"	Lim Jae-hyun	Kakao M	942,146,327
3	"Every Day, Every Moment"	Paul Kim	SM Entertainment	934,028,405
4	"The Day Was Beautiful"	Kassy	Nextar Entertainment	915,887,603
5	"Boy with Luv"	BTS feat. Halsey	Big Hit Entertainment	899,390,340
6	"After You've Gone"	MC the Max	325 Entertainment	893,285,031
7	"Me After You"	Paul Kim	MMO Entertainment	880,765,876
8	"Gotta Go"	Chungha	MNH Entertainment	857,703,141
9	"Four Seasons"	Taeyeon	SM Entertainment	842,426,105
10	"For Lovers Who Hesitate"	Jannabi	Peponi Music	829,369,708

2020

Yearly Top 10 Best-Charting Songs
#	Song	Artist	Label	Aggregate points
1	"Any Song"	Zico	KOZ Entertainment	991,888,968
2	"Meteor"	Changmo	Ambition Musik	922,076,675
3	"Aloha"	Jo Jung-suk	JAM Entertainment	869,270,427
4	"Your Shampoo Scent in the Flowers"	Jang Beom-june	Stone Music Entertainment	856,383,986
5	"Blueming"	IU	Kakao M	837,811,441
6	"Eight"	IU feat. Suga	Kakao M	822,502,029
7	"Late Night"	Noel	C-JeS Entertainment	733,352,695
8	"How Can I Love the Heartbreak, You're the One I Love"	AKMU	YG Entertainment	694,653,300
9	"Psycho"	Red Velvet	SM Entertainment	693,910,356
10	"Start Over"	Gaho	Blending Entertainment	693,685,839

2021

Yearly Top 10 Best-Charting Songs
#	Song	Artist	Label	Aggregate points
1	"Celebrity"	IU	Kakao M	888,135,191
2	"Rollin'"	Brave Girls	Brave Entertainment	821,525,830
3	"Dynamite"	BTS	Big Hit Entertainment	739,835,798
4	"Lilac"	IU	Kakao M	701,774,685
5	"Next Level"	Aespa	SM Entertainment	694,838,658
6	"Peaches"	Justin Bieber feat. Daniel Caesar and Giveon	Def Jam	683,556,478
7	"Butter"	BTS	Big Hit Music	629,846,528
8	"Traffic Light"	Lee Mu-jin	Show Play	616,721,997
9	"Shiny Star (2020)"	KyoungSeo	Dream Engine	616,183,012
10	"Foolish Love"	M.O.M	Munhwa Broadcasting Corporation	558,981,702

2022

Yearly Top 10 Best-Charting Songs
#	Song	Artist	Label	Aggregate points
1	"Love Dive"	Ive	Starship Entertainment	808,096,095
2	"Tomboy"	(G)I-dle	Cube Entertainment	756,188,453
3	"Drunken Confession"	Kim Min-seok	Mint Paper, Label GHS	681,836,572
4	"Love, Maybe"	MeloMance	Abyss Company	668,696,709
5	"Love Always Runs Away"	Lim Young-woong	Mulgogi Music	635,225,646
6	"Eleven"	Ive	Starship Entertainment	595,892,371
7	"Still Life"	BigBang	YG Entertainment	569,666,809
8	"That That"	Psy feat. Suga	P Nation	536,264,813
9	"If You Lovingly Call My Name"	GyeongseoYeji and Jeon Gunho	Monday Kids Company	514,888,578
10	"Beyond Love"	Big Naughty feat. 10cm	H1ghr Music	495,877,807

2023

Yearly Top 10 Best-Charting Songs
#	Song	Artist	Label	Aggregate points
1	"Ditto"	NewJeans	ADOR	786,834,175
2	"Hype Boy"	NewJeans	ADOR	719,171,601
3	"I Am"	Ive	Starship Entertainment	703,001,603
4	"OMG"	NewJeans	ADOR	651,893,306
5	"Event Horizon"	Younha	C9 Entertainment	610,299,016
6	"Kitsch"	Ive	Starship Entertainment	566,904,927
7	"Queencard"	(G)I-dle	Cube Entertainment	498,811,513
8	"Let's Say Goodbye"	Parc Jae-jung	Stone Music Entertainment	488,345,371
9	"Attention"	NewJeans	ADOR	485,926,697
10	"After Like"	Ive	Starship Entertainment	479,479,119

2024

Yearly Top 10 Best-Charting Songs
#	Song	Artist	Label	Aggregate points
1	"Supernova"	Aespa	SM Entertainment	589,763,835
2	"Plot Twist"	TWS	Pledis Entertainment	555,194,559
3	"Time of Our Life"	Day6	JYP Entertainment	551,512,474
4	"Fate"	(G)I-dle	Cube Entertainment	538,593,834
5	"Love Wins All"	IU	EDAM Entertainment	507,882,111
6	"Magnetic"	Illit	Belift Lab	506,002,513
7	"You Were Beautiful"	Day6	JYP Entertainment	481,571,027
8	"Rhapsody of Sadness	Lim Jae-hyun	Diwon Media	464,812,902
9	"How Sweet"	NewJeans	Ador	455,708,834
10	"To. X"	Taeyeon	SM Entertainment	450,527,727

2025

Yearly Top 10 Best-Charting Songs
#	Song	Artist	Label	Aggregate points
1	"Drowning"	Woodz	EDAM Entertainment	687,339,423
2	"Whiplash"	Aespa	SM Entertainment	547,304,795
3	"Golden"	Huntrix	Republic Records	528,764,107
4	"I'm Firefly"	Hwang Garam	Double X Entertainment, HNS HQ	496,478,966
5	"Home Sweet Home"	G-Dragon feat. Taeyang & Daesung	Galaxy Corporation	494,037,343
6	"Don't You Know"	Zo Zazz & Rocoberry	Brotherhood Entertainment	485,366,529
7	"APT."	Rosé & Bruno Mars	Atlantic Records, The Black Label	470,881,455
8	"Rebel Heart	Ive	Starship Entertainment	425,822,586
9	"To Reach You"	10cm	Cam With Us	418,964,117
10	"If I Say, I Love You"	BoyNextDoor	KOZ Entertainment	414,574,008

== Achievements by songs ==
Most weeks at number one

Total weeks	Artist	Single	Year(s)	Ref.
15	Huntrix (Ejae, Audrey Nuna and Rei Ami)	"Golden"	2025	
13	NewJeans	"Ditto"	2022–2023	
11	BTS	"Dynamite"	2020	
11	Aespa	"Supernova"	2024	
10	Rosé and Bruno Mars	"APT."	2024–2025	
9	Hwasa	"Good Goodbye"	2025–2026	
8	NewJeans	"Super Shy"	2023	
7	Zico	"Any Song"	2020	
7	Mirani, Munchman, Khundi Panda and Mushvenom featuring Justhis	"VVS"	2020–2021	
7	G-Dragon featuring Anderson .Paak	"Too Bad"	2025	
7	Rescene	"Love Attack"	2026	

Most consecutive weeks at number one

Total weeks	Artist	Single	Year(s)	Ref.
15	Huntrix (Ejae, Audrey Nuna and Rei Ami)	"Golden"	2025	
9	Hwasa	"Good Goodbye"	2025–2026	
8	NewJeans	"Super Shy"	2023	
7	Mirani, Munchman, Khundi Panda and Mushvenom featuring Justhis	"VVS"	2020–2021	
7	NewJeans	"Ditto"	2023	
7	G-Dragon featuring Anderson .Paak	"Too Bad"	2025	
6	iKon	"Love Scenario"	2018	
6	IU	"Celebrity"	2021	
6	The Kid Laroi and Justin Bieber	"Stay"	2021	
6	Younha	"Event Horizon"	2022	
6	NewJeans	"Ditto"	2022–2023	
6	Ive	"I Am"	2023	
6	Rosé and Bruno Mars	"APT."	2024	
6	Rescene	"Love Attack"	2026	

Most months at number one

Total months	Artist	Single	Year(s)	Ref.
4	Huntrix (Ejae, Audrey Nuna and Rei Ami)	"Golden"	2025	
3	BTS	"Dynamite"	2020	
3	NewJeans	"Ditto"	2023	
3	Aespa	"Supernova"	2024	
3	Rosé and Bruno Mars	"APT."	2024	
2	Ailee	"I Will Go to You Like the First Snow"	2017	
2	IU featuring Suga	"Eight"	2020	
2	Brave Girls	"Rollin'"	2021	
2	Kim Min-seok	"Drunken Confession"	2022	
2	Younha	"Event Horizon"	2022	
2	NewJeans	"Super Shy"	2023	
2	AKMU	"Love Lee"	2023	

Most consecutive months at number one

Total months	Artist	Album	Year(s)	Ref.
4	Huntrix (Ejae, Audrey Nuna and Rei Ami)	"Golden"	2025	
3	BTS	"Dynamite"	2020	
3	NewJeans	"Ditto"	2023	
3	Aespa	"Supernova"	2024	
3	Rosé and Bruno Mars	"APT."	2024	
2	Ailee	"I Will Go to You Like the First Snow"	2017	
2	IU featuring Suga	"Eight"	2020	
2	Kim Min-seok	"Drunken Confession"	2022	
2	Younha	"Event Horizon"	2022	
2	NewJeans	"Super Shy"	2023	
2	AKMU	"Love Lee"	2023	

== Achievements by artists ==
Most number one singles

Total singles	Artist	Ref.
31	IU	
11	BigBang	
10	AKMU	
9	2NE1	
9	Sistar	
9	Twice	
9	BTS	
9	Lim Young-woong	
8	Huh Gak	
8	Girls' Generation	
8	Davichi	
8	Zion.T	
8	Taeyeon	
8	Zico	
7	Park Hyo-shin	

Most weeks at number one

Total weeks	Artist	Ref.
64	IU	
25	BTS	
23	NewJeans	
22	BigBang	
22	Ive	

Most months at number one

Total months	Artist	Ref.
16	IU	
9	BigBang	
6	NewJeans	
5	Psy	
5	Ive	
5	Zico	
5	AKMU	
4	2NE1	
4	Davichi	
4	BTS	
4	Taeyeon	
4	Huntrix (Ejae, Audrey Nuna and Rei Ami)	

Most consecutive months at number one

Total months	Artist	Year(s)	Ref.
4	BigBang	2015	
4	Huntrix (Ejae, Audrey Nuna and Rei Ami)	2025	
3	BTS	2020	
3	NewJeans	2023	
3	Aespa	2024	
3	Rosé and Bruno Mars	2024	
2	Girls' Generation	2010	
2	BigBang	2012	
2	Ailee	2017	
2	IU	2019	
2	IU and Suga	2020	
2	Kim Min-seok	2022	
2	Younha	2022	
2	Ive	2023	
2	NewJeans	2023	
2	AKMU	2023	
