= Übermensch (album) =

- Digital cover

Studio album by G-Dragon
- Released: February 25, 2025
- Recorded: 2023–24
- Studios: YG (Seoul); The Black Label (Seoul)
- Genres: K-pop; hip-hop
- Length: 25:19
- Languages: English; Korean
- Labels: Galaxy; Empire
- Producers: 24; Alissia; Anderson .Paak; Bongo ByTheWay; Boys Noize; G-Dragon; JMike; Kush; Michael Warren; Salaam-Bailey; Teddy Park; Theron "Uptown AP" Thomas; Tommy Brown; VVN; Xavier de Rosnay

G-Dragon chronology
Kwon Ji Yong (2017)	Übermensch (2025)

Singles from Übermensch
- 1. "Power" Released: October 31, 2024; 2. "Home Sweet Home" Released: November 22, 2024; 3. "Too Bad / Drama" Released: February 24, 2025

Übermensch is the third studio album by South Korean rapper and singer-songwriter G-Dragon, released on February 25, 2025, by Galaxy Corporation and Empire Distribution. It is his first musical release in 7 years since Kwon Ji Yong in 2017 and his first studio album in 12 years since Coup d'Etat (2013), as well as his first album since leaving YG Entertainment in 2023.

== Background and development ==
On January 1, 2023, G-Dragon, then signed under YG Entertainment, officially announced via YouTube that he was working on a new album. Following his departure, the CEO of his new label, Galaxy Corporation, confirmed in a press release that G-Dragon would be making an official comeback in 2024. On the same day, G-Dragon confirmed the comeback in a handwritten letter.

On April 3, 2024, Galaxy Corporation announced that G-Dragon's new album would be released during the second half of the year, and would involve carrying out "global activities", as well as Japanese activities. On October 7, G-Dragon confirmed that his album would be released on October 25, 2024, with sources noting it would be his first album release since Kwon Ji Yong in 2017. On October 7, numerous outlets began reporting that G-Dragon had begun filming his comeback music video, with the October 25 comeback date being finalized. In response, Galaxy Corporation confirmed that while the comeback was in the works, the schedule had yet to be finalized.

Beginning on October 21, G-Dragon began posting cryptic teases in relation to the comeback, posting black squares with faint progress bars. On October 23, Star News reported that the comeback was expected to be a full album, with the release aiming to happen before his performance at the 2024 MAMA Awards. A third teaser for the album was posted on October 28.

== Release and promotion ==
On the October 30 episode of You Quiz on the Block, G-Dragon introduced his first new song since 2017, a pre-release single titled "Power." The single was officially released on October 31, alongside the announcement that G-Dragon had signed a deal to release music with Empire Distribution. On November 8, it was reported that another single for the album would premiere at the MAMA awards. The single, "Home Sweet Home" would release on November 22, featuring Big Bang members Taeyang and Daesung. On February 4, 2025, it was officially confirmed that the album, titled Übermensch, would be released on February 25.

== Track listing ==
Übermensch track listing
No.	Title	Lyrics	Music	Arrangement	Length
1.	"Home Sweet Home" (featuring Taeyang and Daesung)	G-Dragon; Teddy Park; Choice37	G-Dragon; Park; 24; Kush; VVN	24; NOS; Jumpa; Mondee	3:31
2.	"Power"	G-Dragon	G-Dragon; Tommy Brown; Theron Thomas; Steven Franks	Brown; Franks	2:23
3.	"Too Bad" (featuring Anderson .Paak)	G-Dragon; Anderson .Paak	G-Dragon; .Paak; Bongo; Alissia; Yohan	G-Dragon; .Paak; Bongo; Alissia	2:33
4.	"Drama"	G-Dragon; Diane Warren; Choice37	D. Warren	G-Dragon	3:54
5.	"Ibelongiiu"	G-Dragon; Jean Baptiste Kouame; Maegan Cottone	G-Dragon; Alexander Ridha; Kouame; Cottone	Boys Noize	3:13
6.	"Take Me"	G-Dragon	G-Dragon; Ridha; Dominic "Mocky" Salole	G-Dragon; Boys Noize	3:39
7.	"Bonamana" (보나마나)	G-Dragon	G-Dragon; Brandon "Stix" Salaam-Bailey; Michael Warren; Choice37	G-Dragon; Salaam-Bailey; M. Warren	3:15
8.	"Gyro-Drop"	G-Dragon; Gaeko; Gamal Lewis	G-Dragon; Ridha; Lewis; Jeremy Coleman; Xavier de Rosnay	Boys Noize; JMike	2:48
Total length:					25:19

== Charts ==
=== Weekly charts ===
Weekly chart performance
Chart (2025)	Peak position
Australian Albums (ARIA)	26
Australian Hip Hop/R&B Albums (ARIA)	5
Austrian Albums (Ö3 Austria)	44
Belgian Albums (Ultratop Wallonia)	192
Canadian Albums (Billboard)	71
French Albums (SNEP)	145
Japanese Albums (Oricon)	13
Japanese Combined Albums (Oricon)	13
Japanese Hot Albums (Billboard Japan)	19
Scottish Albums (Official Charts)	12
South Korean Albums (Circle)	2
UK Albums (Official Charts)	93
UK Independent Albums (Official Charts)	4
US Independent Albums (Billboard)	27
US Top Album Sales (Billboard)	10
US World Albums (Billboard)	3

=== Monthly charts ===
Monthly chart performance
Chart (2025)	Position
Japanese Albums (Oricon)	50
South Korean Albums (Circle)	4

=== Year-end charts ===
Year-end chart performance
Chart (2025)	Position
Japanese Download Albums (Billboard Japan)	40
South Korean Albums (Circle)	38

== Certifications and sales ==
=== Certifications ===
Certifications
Region	Certification	Certified units/sales
South Korea (KMCA)	2× Platinum	500,000^{^}
South Korea (KMCA) Nemo	2× Platinum	500,000^{^}
^{^} Shipments figures based on certification alone.

=== Sales ===
Country	Sales amount
China (digital album)	770,000
China (physical album)	600,330
Japan	10,915 (Note: Sales figures for Übermensch: Physical sales: 8,423; Digital sales: 2,492)
South Korea	1,107,137

== Release history ==
Release dates and formats
Region	Date	Format	Label	Ref.
Various	February 25, 2025	Digital download; streaming	Galaxy; Empire	
South Korea	February 25, 2025	CD	Galaxy; Empire	
Various	March 7, 2025	CD	Galaxy; Empire	
