= Too Bad (G-Dragon song) =

Single by G-Dragon featuring Anderson .Paak

from the album Übermensch
- Language: English; Korean
- Released: February 24, 2025
- Genre: K-pop
- Length: 2:33
- Label: Galaxy; Empire
- Composers: G-Dragon; Anderson .Paak; Bongo; Alissia; Yohan
- Lyricists: G-Dragon; Anderson .Paak
- Producers: Anderson .Paak; BongoByTheWay

G-Dragon singles chronology
"Home Sweet Home" (2024)	"Too Bad" (2025)	"WDA (Whole Different Animal)" (2026)

Anderson .Paak singles chronology
"Summer Drop" (2024)	"Too Bad" (2025)	"Play This Song" (2025)

Music video
- "Too Bad" on YouTube

"Too Bad" is a song by South Korean rapper G-Dragon featuring American rapper Anderson .Paak. It was released through Galaxy Corporation and Empire on February 24, 2025, as the third single from G-Dragon's third studio album, Übermensch (2025). The song was written by G-Dragon, Alissia, Yohan, BongoByTheWay, and Paak, whilst production was handled by the latter two. The song peaked at number one on the Circle Digital Chart in South Korea.

== Accolades ==
Awards and nominations for "Too Bad"
Ceremony	Year	Category	Result	Ref.
Asian Pop Music Awards	2025	Best Collaboration	Nominated	
Asian Pop Music Awards	2025	Best Music Video	Nominated	
MAMA Awards	2025	Best Dance Performance Male Solo	Won	
MAMA Awards	2025	Best Choreography	Nominated	
MAMA Awards	2025	Best Collaboration	Nominated	
MAMA Awards	2025	Song of the Year	Shortlisted	
Seoul Music Awards	2025	R&B/Hip-hop Award	Nominated	

Music program awards
Program	Date	Ref.
M Countdown	March 6, 2025	
M Countdown	March 13, 2025	
Show! Music Core	March 8, 2025	
Show! Music Core	March 15, 2025	
Show! Music Core	March 29, 2025	
Inkigayo	March 9, 2025	
Inkigayo	March 16, 2025	
Inkigayo	March 23, 2025	
Show Champion	March 12, 2025	
Music Bank	March 14, 2025	

== Credits and personnel ==
Credits adapted from Melon.

- G-Dragon – vocals, lyricist, composer, arranger
- Anderson .Paak – lyricist, composer, arranger
- Bongo – composer, arranger
- Alissia – composer, arranger
- Yohan – composer

== Charts ==
=== Weekly charts ===
Weekly chart performance
Chart (2024)	Peak position
Global 200 (Billboard)	30
Hong Kong (Billboard)	7
Malaysia (IFPI)	13
New Zealand Hot Singles (RMNZ)	16
Singapore (RIAS)	9
South Korea (Circle)	1
Taiwan (Billboard)	3
UK Singles Downloads (Official Charts)	27
UK Singles Sales (OCC)	30
US World Digital Song Sales (Billboard)	6

=== Monthly charts ===
Monthly chart performance
Chart (2025)	Peak position
South Korea (Circle)	1

=== Year-end charts ===
Year-end chart performance
Chart (2025)	Position
South Korea (Circle)	14

== Release history ==
Release formats for "Too Bad"
Region	Date	Format	Label	Ref.
Various	February 24, 2025	Digital download; streaming	Galaxy; Empire	

== See also ==
- List of Inkigayo Chart winners (2025)
- List of K-pop songs on the Billboard charts
- List of M Countdown Chart winners (2025)
- List of Music Bank Chart winners (2025)
- List of Show Champion Chart winners (2025)
- List of Show! Music Core Chart winners (2025)
