= Home Sweet Home (G-Dragon song) =

Single by G-Dragon featuring Taeyang and Daesung

from the album Übermensch
- Language: English; Korean
- Released: November 22, 2024
- Genre: K-pop; hip-hop; pop-rock
- Length: 3:31
- Label: Galaxy; Empire
- Composers: G-Dragon; Teddy Park; 24; Kush; VVN
- Lyricists: G-Dragon; Teddy Park; Choice37
- Producers: G-Dragon; Teddy Park; 24; Kush; VVN

G-Dragon singles chronology
| "Power" (2024) | "Home Sweet Home" (2024) | "Too Bad" (2025) |

Taeyang singles chronology
| "Seed" (2023) | "Home Sweet Home" (2024) |

Daesung singles chronology
| "Our Memories" (2024) | "Home Sweet Home" (2024) |

"Home Sweet Home" is a song by South Korean rapper G-Dragon, featuring BigBang bandmates Taeyang and Daesung. It was released through Galaxy Corporation and Empire on November 22, 2024, as the second single from G-Dragon's third studio album, Übermensch (2025). The song was written by G-Dragon, Teddy Park, and Choice37 whilst production was handled by G-Dragon, Park, 24, Kush, and VVN. The song peaked at number one on the Circle Digital Chart in South Korea.

== Background and release ==
A day prior to the release of the song on November 21, 2024, G-Dragon unveiled a teaser image consisting of golden piano keys on a black background. Fans of G-Dragon and BigBang speculated about a potential new song featuring himself, Taeyang and Daesung, interpreting the piano keys as a representation of the trio. The release of the song the following day confirmed the collaboration between all three members without prior announcement.

== Credits and personnel ==
Credits adapted from Melon.

- G-Dragon – vocals, lyricist, composer
- Teddy Park – lyricist, composer
- Choice37 – lyricist
- 24 – arranger, composer
- Jumpa – arranger
- Kush – composer
- VVN – composer

== Charts ==
=== Weekly charts ===
Weekly chart performance
| Chart (2024–2025) | Peak position |
|---|---|
| Global 200 (Billboard) | 27 |
| Hong Kong (Billboard) | 2 |
| Japan (Japan Hot 100) | 21 |
| Japan Combined Singles (Oricon) | 25 |
| Malaysia (Billboard) | 3 |
| New Zealand Hot Singles (RMNZ) | 17 |
| Singapore (RIAS) | 4 |
| South Korea (Circle) | 1 |
| South Korea (Korea Hot 100) | 48 |
| Taiwan (Billboard) | 2 |
| UK Singles Sales (OCC) | 36 |
| US Hot Dance/Electronic Songs (Billboard) | 23 |
| US Hot Dance/Pop Songs (Billboard) | 15 |

=== Monthly charts ===
Monthly chart performance
| Chart (2025) | Position |
|---|---|
| South Korea (Circle) | 1 |

=== Year-end charts ===
Year-end chart performance
| Chart | Year | Position |
|---|---|---|
| South Korea (Circle) | 2024 | 120 |
| South Korea (Circle) | 2025 | 5 |

== Release history ==
Release formats for "Home Sweet Home"
| Region | Date | Format | Label | Ref. |
|---|---|---|---|---|
| Various | November 22, 2024 | Digital download; streaming | Galaxy; Empire | |
