= G-Dragon discography =

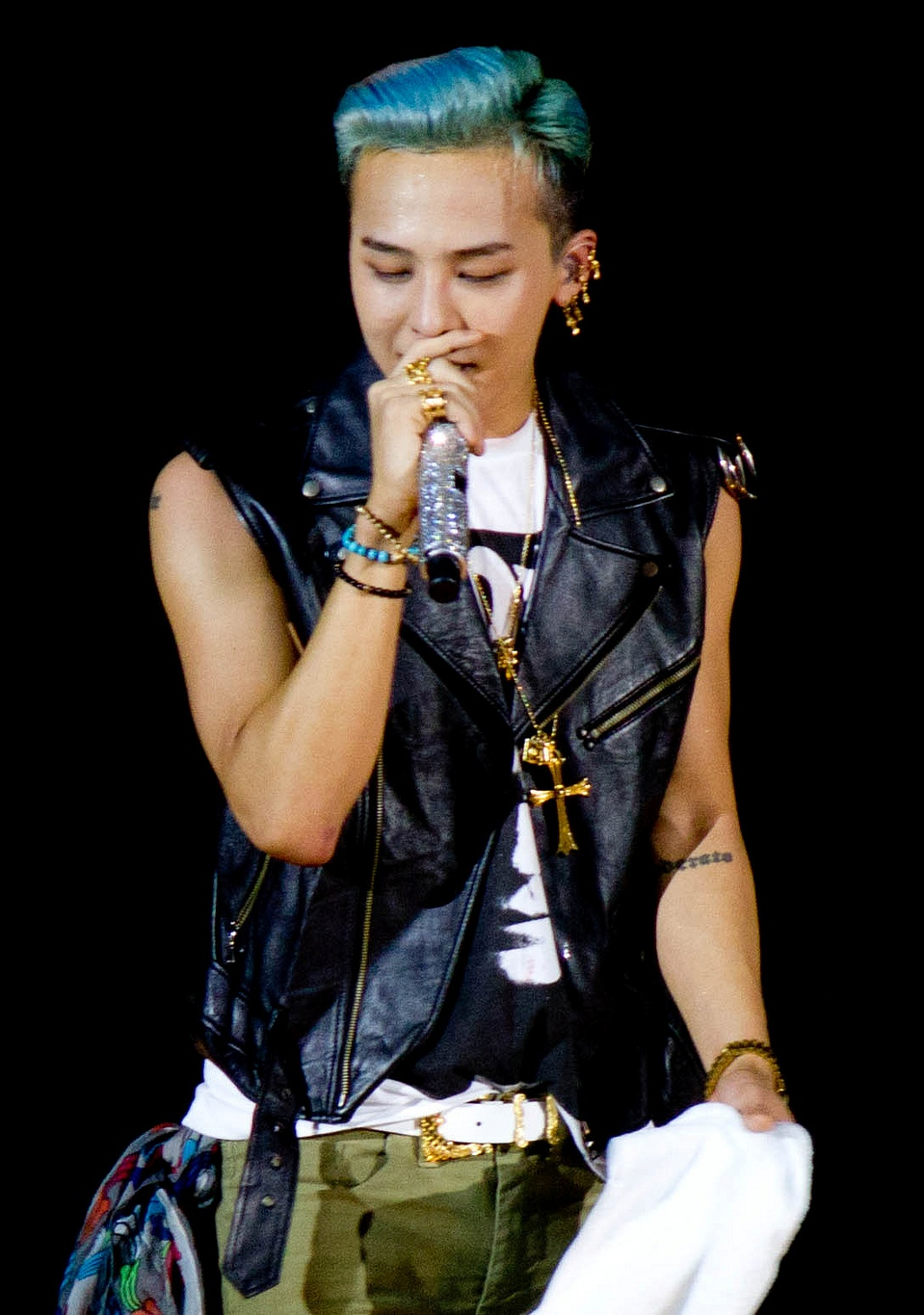
- G-Dragon in 2012.
- Studio albums: 3
- Extended plays: 2
- Live albums: 4
- Compilation albums: 1
- Singles: 11
- Promotional singles: 2

South Korean rapper G-Dragon began his career as a member of South Korean boy band Big Bang. His discography as a solo artist began in 2009, and includes three studio albums, one compilation album, four live albums, two extended plays, eleven singles, and two promotional singles.

In 2009, G-Dragon released his debut studio album Heartbreaker. Propelled by its lead-single of the same name, an electronic pop song, the album sold over 300,000 copies and went on to win Album of the Year at the 2009 Mnet Asian Music Awards. The song "Breathe" managed to chart within the Top 20 while his other songs—"The Leaders", "A Boy", "Hello", and "She's Gone"—went on to top various charts upon their release. In November 2010, YG Entertainment announced a collaboration album between G-Dragon and T.O.P. To promote their album, the duo released three singles: "High High", "Oh Yeah", and "Knock Out" (뻑이가요; Revised Romanization: Ppeogigayo). The album debuted at number one on the Gaon Album Chart.

Three years after his debut album, G-Dragon released his first extended play One of a Kind in September 2012. The album was positively received, topping the Billboard World Albums chart and entering the Billboard 200 chart at number 161. As of the end of 2012, the album netted in over 200,000 copies, making it the best selling album by a Korean soloist since the release of his first album Heartbreaker in 2009. The EP won the award for Record of the Year at the 2013 Seoul Music Awards. His second album, Coup d'Etat, was released in September 2013. Six tracks from Coup d'Etat placed within the top 10 of the Gaon Digital Chart with "Who You?" (니가 뭔데; Revised Romanization: Niga Mwonde) topping the chart. The album entered the Billboard 200, making G-Dragon the first Korean act to have multiples entries in the chart. The success of Coup d'Etat led to G-Dragon winning Artist of the Year at the 2013 Mnet Asian Music Awards.

After a four-year hiatus as a solo artist, G-Dragon released his second extended play Kwon Ji Yong in June 2017, which spawned the number one single, "Untitled, 2014". Other songs from the EP "Super Star" and "Bullshit" charted at number 4 and 6 respectively. The EP surpassed one million copies sold on QQ Music, the biggest online music service in China, in six days, the shortest time ever for any album. In the United States, Kwon Ji Yong became his best-selling album and the first by a Korean soloist to spend multiple weeks atop the Billboard World Albums chart.

== Albums ==
=== Studio albums ===
List of studio albums, showing selected details, selected chart positions, and sales figures
Title	Album details	Peak chart positions										Sales	Certifications
Title	Album details	KOR	AUS	AUT	CAN	FRA	JPN	SCO	UK	US	US World	Sales	Certifications
Heartbreaker	Released: August 18, 2009; Label: YG Entertainment; Format: CD, digital download	7	—	—	—	—	11	—	—	—	—	KOR: 309,343	—N/a
Coup d'Etat	Released: September 13, 2013; Label: YG Entertainment, KT Music; Format: CD, digital download, LP	1	—	—	—	— (Note: Coup d'Etat did not enter the SNEP Albums Chart, but peaked at number 138 on the Download Albums Chart.)	—	—	— (Note: Coup d'Etat did not enter the UK Albums Chart, but peaked at number 35 on the Hip Hop and R&B Albums Chart, and number 17 on the Independent Album Breakers Chart.)	182	1	KOR: 224,188; US: 4,000	—N/a
Übermensch	Released: February 25, 2025; Label: Galaxy Corporation, Empire; Format: CD, digital download, LP	2	26	44	71	145	13	12	93	—	3	WW: 1,370,000; KOR: 1,107,906; JPN: 10,915 (Note: Sales figures for Übermensch: Physical sales: 8,423; Digital sales: 2,492)	KMCA: 2× Platinum; KMCA: 2x Platinum (Nemo)
"—" denotes a recording that did not chart or was not released in that territory.

=== Compilation albums ===
List of compilation albums, showing selected details, selected chart positions, and sales figures
Title	Album details	Peak chart positions	Sales
Title	Album details	JPN	Sales
Coup d'Etat + One of a Kind & Heartbreaker	Released: November 27, 2013; Label: YGEX; Format: CD, digital download	2	JPN: 110,860

=== Live albums ===
List of live albums, showing selected details, selected chart positions, and sales figures
Title	Album details	Peak chart positions		Sales
Title	Album details	KOR	TW	Sales
Shine a Light	Released: March 3, 2010; Label: YG Entertainment; Format: CD, digital download	1	5	KOR: 50,449
1st World Tour Commemorative Vinyl LP – One of a Kind	Released: August 8, 2013; Label: YG Entertainment; Format: LP	12	—	—N/a
2013 G-Dragon World Tour Live CD [One of a Kind in Seoul]	Released: September 3, 2013; Label: YG Entertainment; Format: CD, digital download	2	—	KOR: 21,359
2013 G-Dragon 1st World Tour [One of a Kind] The Final	Released: November 22, 2013; Label: YG Entertainment; Format: CD, digital download	—	—	—N/a
"—" denotes a recording that did not chart or was not released in that territory.

== Extended plays ==
List of extended plays, showing selected details, selected chart positions, and sales figures
Title	EP details	Peak positions							Sales
Title	EP details	KOR	CAN	JPN	NZ	US	US Heat	US World	Sales
One of a Kind	Released: September 15, 2012; Label: YG Entertainment; Format: CD, digital download	1	—	12	—	161	6	1	KOR: 265,361; JPN: 39,619
Kwon Ji Yong	Released: June 8, 2017; Label: YG Entertainment; Format: USB, CD, digital download	51 (Note: Kwon Ji Yong was not permitted to chart on the Gaon Album Chart upon its release in June 2017 as USBs were not recognised as a physical format. The rules were later changed in December 2017 and came into effect in January 2018, when Kwon Ji Yong debuted at number 51 on the first week of 2018.)	52	3	39	192	1	1	KOR: 18,600; JPN: 64,829; US: 7,000
"—" denotes a recording that did not chart or was not released in that territory.

== Singles ==
=== As lead artist ===
List of singles as lead artist, showing year released, selected chart positions, sales figures, certifications, and name of the album
Title	Year	Peak chart positions										Sales	Certifications	Album
Title	Year	KOR	KOR Billb. (Note: Includes the Billboard K-pop Hot 100 (launched in August 25, 2011 and discontinued since April 30, 2022), and the subsequent Billboard South Korea Songs chart (launched in May 7, 2022).)	HK	JPN Hot	MLY	NZ Hot	SGP	UK DL	US World	WW (Note: The Billboard Global 200 chart was first launched and issued on the date September 19, 2020.)	Sales	Certifications	Album
"Heartbreaker" (solo or featuring Flo Rida)	2009	8 (Note: In 2025, its solo version peaked on the Circle Digital Chart at number 173 following the charts creation in 2010.)	—	—	—	—	—	—	—	—	—	—N/a	—N/a	Heartbreaker and Shine a Light
"That XX"	2012	1	2	—	—	—	—	—	—	—	—	KOR: 1,906,000	—N/a	One of a Kind
"Crayon"	2012	3	4	—	—	—	—	—	—	5	—	KOR: 1,955,000	—N/a	One of a Kind
"Black" (featuring Jennie)	2013	2	3	—	—	—	—	—	—	—	—	KOR: 1,009,720	—N/a	Coup d'Etat
"Who You?"	2013	1	4	—	—	—	—	—	—	6	—	KOR: 1,145,000	—N/a	Coup d'Etat
"Crooked"	2013	3	2	—	—	—	—	—	—	5	—	KOR: 1,814,000	RIAJ: Gold (st.); RIAJ: Gold (dig)	Coup d'Etat
"Niliria" (G-Dragon version)	2013	32	38	—	—	—	—	—	—	—	—	KOR: 151,083	—N/a	Coup d'Etat
"Untitled, 2014"	2017	1	3	—	57	—	—	—	—	4	—	KOR: 2,500,000	—N/a	Kwon Ji Yong
"Power"	2024	3	2	11	88	8	9	16	23	—	29	JPN: 1,401	—N/a	Übermensch
"Home Sweet Home" (featuring Taeyang and Daesung)	2024	1	1	2	21	3	17	5	—	— (Note: "Home Sweet Home" did not enter the US World Digital Song Sales, but peaked at number 15 on the Hot Dance/Pop Songs, and number 23 on the Hot Dance/Electronic Songs.)	27	JPN: 5,478; WW: 8,000	KMCA: Platinum	Übermensch
"Too Bad" (featuring Anderson .Paak)	2025	1	—	7	—	10	16	9	27	6	30	—N/a	—N/a	Übermensch
"—" denotes a recording that did not chart or was not released in that territory.

=== Promotional singles ===
List of promotional singles, showing year released, selected chart positions, sales figure, and name of the album
Title	Year	Peak chart positions			Sales	Album
Title	Year	KOR	KOR Hot	US World	Sales	Album
"One of a Kind"	2012	9	14	7	KOR: 778,000	One of a Kind
"MichiGO" (미치Go)	2013	17	17	8	KOR: 288,000	Coup d'Etat

=== Collaborations ===
List of collaboration singles, showing year released, selected chart positions, sales figures, and name of the album
Title	Year	Peak chart positions				Sales	Album
Title	Year	KOR	FIN Dig.	JPN Hot	US World	Sales	Album
"Having an Affair" (바람났어) (with Park Myung-soo & Park Bom)	2011	1	—	—	—	KOR: 3,660,769	Infinite Challenge Westcoast Highway Music Festival
"Going to Try" (해볼라고) (with Jeong Hyeong-don)	2013	2	—	—	—	KOR: 880,053	Infinite Challenge Free Highway Music Festival
"Good Boy" (with Taeyang)	2014	5	21	45	1	KOR: 1,260,683; US: 5,000	Non-album single
"Mapsosa" (맙소사) (with Taeyang & Hwang Kwanghee)	2015	2	—	—	10	KOR: 1,302,380	Infinite Challenge Yeongdong Expressway Song Festival
"Zutter" (쩔어) (with T.O.P)	2015	2	30	—	2	KOR: 1,015,028; US: 6,000	Made
"Good Day 2025 (Telepathy + By the Moonlight Window)" (굿데이 2025 (텔레파시 + 달빛 창가에서)) (featuring various artists)	2025	21	—	—	—	—N/a	Good Day OST
"—" denotes a recording that did not chart or was not released in that territory.

=== As featured artist ===
List of singles as featured artist, showing year released, selected chart positions, sales figures, and name of the album
Title	Year	Peak chart positions			Sales	Album
Title	Year	KOR	JPN	US World	Sales	Album
"Storm" (Perry featuring G-Dragon, Sean & Masta Wu)	2001	—	—	—	—N/a	Perry by Storm
"G-Dragon" (Perry featuring G-Dragon)	2001	—	—	—	—N/a	Perry by Storm
"Magic Eye" (Wheesung featuring G-Dragon)	2002	—	—	—	—N/a	Like A Movie
"Intro" (Se7en featuring G-Dragon & Perry)	2003	—	—	—	—N/a	Just Listen
"Run" (Se7en featuring G-Dragon & Taeyang)	2006	—	—	—	—N/a	24/7
"Can You Feel Me" (Se7en featuring G-Dragon)	2006	—	—	—	—N/a	Se7ultion
"Anystar" (Park Bom featuring G-Dragon & Gummy)	2006	—	—	—	—N/a	Non-album single
"Super Fly" (Lexy featuring G-Dragon, T.O.P & Taeyang)	2007	—	—	—	—N/a	Rush
"So in Love Pt.2" (Kim Jo-han featuring G-Dragon)	2007	—	—	—	—N/a	Soul Family with Johan
"Intro – Work It Now" (Gummy featuring G-Dragon)	2008	—	—	—	—N/a	Comfort
"Party" (Uhm Jung-hwa featuring G-Dragon)	2008	—	—	—	—N/a	D.I.S.C.O
"D.I.S.C.O Pt.2" (Uhm Jung-hwa featuring G-Dragon)	2008	—	—	—	—N/a	D.I.S.C.O Part 2
"What" (YMGA featuring G-Dragon, Teddy, Kush, Perry & CL)	2008	—	—	—	—N/a	Made In R.O.K
"Strong Baby" (Seungri featuring G-Dragon)	2009	—	—	—	—N/a	Remember
"Rain Is Fallin" (W-inds featuring G-Dragon)	2009	—	2	—	—N/a	Rain Is Fallin'/Hybrid Dream
"I Need a Girl" (Taeyang featuring G-Dragon)	2010	4	—	17	KOR: 1,876,167	Solar
"Open the Window" (Seungri featuring G-Dragon)	2011	68	—	—	—N/a	V.V.I.P
"Dancing on My Own" (Pixie Lott featuring G-Dragon & T.O.P)	2012	36	—	—	KOR: 342,113	Young Foolish Happy
"Blue Frog" (Psy featuring G-Dragon)	2012	5	—	20	KOR: 1,155,162	PSY 6 (Six Rules), Part 1
"Bubble Butt" (Major Lazer featuring Bruno Mars, G-Dragon, T.O.P, Tyga & Mystic)	2013	78	—	—	KOR: 95,848	Free the Universe (Asian Edition)
"Let's Talk About Love" (Seungri featuring G-Dragon & Taeyang)	2013	15	—	9	KOR: 121,416	Let's Talk About Love
"Dirty Vibe" (Skrillex featuring Diplo, G-Dragon and CL)	2014	— (Note: "Dirty Vibe" charted at number 6 on the Gaon International Digital Chart.)	—	— (Note: "Dirty Vibe" peaked at number 15 on the Billboard Hot Dance/Electronic Songs Chart)	KOR: 69,583	Recess
"Stay with Me" (Taeyang featuring G-Dragon)	2014	7	—	4	KOR: 389,779	Rise
"Temple" (Baauer featuring M.I.A. and G-Dragon)	2016	—	—	— (Note: "Temple" peaked at number 36 on the Billboard Dance/Electronic Digital Songs chart and at number 26 on the Billboard Dance/Electronic Songs Chart)	—N/a	Aa
"Complex" (Zion.T featuring G-Dragon)	2017	2	—	—	KOR: 600,193	OO
"Palette" (IU featuring G-Dragon)	2017	1	—	4	KOR: 2,500,000	Palette
"Fact Assault" (Psy featuring G-Dragon)	2017	16	—	—	KOR: 157,869	4X2=8
"WDA (Whole Different Animal)" (Aespa featuring G-Dragon)	2026	12	—	—	—N/a	Lemonade
"—" denotes a recording that did not chart or was not released in that territory.

== Other charted songs ==
List of other songs, showing year released, selected chart positions, sales figures, and name of the album
Title	Year	Peak chart positions								Sales	Album
Title	Year	KOR	KOR Hot	HK	MLY	SGP Reg.	TW	US World	WW Excl. US	Sales	Album
"This Love"	2006	— (Note: "This Love" did not enter the Gaon Digital Chart following its creation in 2010, but peaked at number 235 on the download chart in 2015.)	—	—	—	—	—	—	—	KOR: 11,000	Big Bang Vol.1
"A Boy" (소년이여)	2009	190 (Note: Charted in 2025.)	—	—	—	—	—	—	—	—N/a	Heartbreaker
"This Love" (remix)	2010	72	—	—	—	—	—	—	—	—N/a	Shine a Light
"Breath" (remix)	2010	85	—	—	—	—	—	—	—	—N/a	Shine a Light
"Without You" (featuring Rosé)	2012	10	15	—	—	—	—	—	—	KOR: 646,074	One of a Kind
"Missing You" (featuring Kim Yoon-ah of Jaurim)	2012	2	2	—	—	—	—	23	—	KOR: 2,137,929	One of a Kind
"Today" (featuring Kim Jong-wan of Nell)	2012	17	20	—	—	—	—	—	—	KOR: 536,237	One of a Kind
"Coup d'Etat" (featuring Diplo and Baauer)	2013	5	15	—	—	—	—	4	—	KOR: 453,000	Coup d'Etat
"Niliria" (featuring Missy Elliott)	2013	9	30	—	—	—	—	8	—	KOR: 249,862	Coup d'Etat
"R.O.D." (featuring Lydia Paek)	2013	6	21	—	—	—	—	16	—	KOR: 451,926	Coup d'Etat
"Shake the World"	2013	25	29	—	—	—	—	11	—	KOR: 213,726	Coup d'Etat
"Runaway"	2013	27	26	—	—	—	—	—	—	KOR: 202,024	Coup d'Etat
"I Love It" (featuring Zion.T and Boys Noize)	2013	20	13	—	—	—	—	—	—	KOR: 277,553	Coup d'Etat
"You Do"	2013	35	—	—	—	—	—	—	—	KOR: 108,311	Coup d'Etat
"Black" (featuring Sky Ferreira)	2013	—	—	—	—	—	—	10	—	—N/a	Coup d'Etat
"Super Star"	2017	4	23	—	—	—	—	—	—	KOR: 306,053	Kwon Ji Yong
"Bullshit"	2017	6	21	—	—	—	—	10	—	KOR: 288,051	Kwon Ji Yong
"Intro. Middle Fingers-Up"	2017	15	35	—	—	—	—	—	—	KOR: 148,749	Kwon Ji Yong
"Outro. Divina Commedia"	2017	16	—	—	—	—	—	—	—	KOR: 154,223	Kwon Ji Yong
"Drama"	2025	15	—	18	24	14	11	—	—	—N/a	Übermensch
"Ibelongiiu"	2025	21	—	—	—	—	—	—	—	—N/a	Übermensch
"Take Me"	2025	12	—	—	—	22	—	—	153	—N/a	Übermensch
"Bonamana" (보나마나)	2025	35	—	—	—	—	—	—	—	—N/a	Übermensch
"Gyro-Drop"	2025	29	—	—	—	—	—	—	—	—N/a	Übermensch
"—" denotes a recording that did not chart or was not released in that territory.

== See also ==
- G-Dragon videography
- List of songs written by G-Dragon
- Big Bang discography
