= List of songs written by G-Dragon =

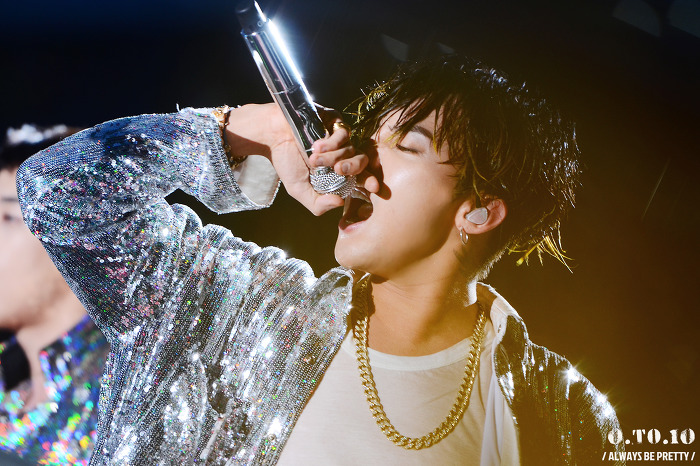
G-Dragon performing in August 2016, as part of Big Bang's 0.TO.10 concert tour in Seoul

G-Dragon is a South Korean rapper, singer-songwriter, record producer, and leader of Korean boy band Big Bang. He is widely known to be the main songwriter and producer of the group, penning all of the group's major hits, including "Lies", "Last Farewell", and "Haru Haru" which is one of the most digitally downloaded songs in Korean music history. The Korea Times has called him a "genius singer-songwriter", citing that his songs became instant hits and anthems for young people around the country. In 2008, G-Dragon became the youngest person to be listed on The 10 Greatest Korean Composers at the age of 20. He was named the Top Songwriter of 2012 by Melon. As of August 2025, the Korea Music Copyright Association has 186 songs listed under his name. G-Dragon has written 24 number one songs on the Gaon Digital Chart.

== Big Bang albums ==
Year	Album	Song	Lyrics		Music		Notes
Year	Album	Song	Credited	With	Credited	With	Notes
2006	Big Bang	"Intro (Put Your Hands Up!)"	Yes	—N/a	Yes	Brave Brothers	—N/a
2006	Big Bang	"눈물뿐인 바보 (A Fool's Only Tears)"	Yes	An Young Min	No	Jeon Seung Woo	—N/a
2006	Big Bang	"We Belong Together" feat. Park Bom	Yes	T.O.P.	Yes	—N/a	—N/a
2006	Big Bang	"This Love"	Yes	—N/a	Yes	—N/a	remake of the Maroon 5 single of the same name
2006	Bigbang Is V.I.P	"La La La"	Yes	BigBang	No	Perry	—N/a
2006	Bigbang Is V.I.P	"Ma Girl"	Yes	—N/a	No	Israel Dwaine Cruz	—N/a
2006	Bigbang Is V.I.P	"V.I.P."	Yes	BigBang	Yes	Kim Do-hyung	—N/a
2006	Big Bang 03	"Victory (Intro)"	Yes	—N/a	Yes	Brave Brothers	—N/a
2006	Big Bang 03	"Big Bang"	Yes	—N/a	No	Perry	—N/a
2006	Big Bang 03	"Forever With You" feat. Park Bom	Yes	T.O.P.	Yes	—N/a	—N/a
2006	Big Bang 03	"Goodbye Baby"	Yes	Taeyang, T.O.P	No	Perry, Brave Brothers	—N/a
2006	Since 2007	"흔들어 (Shake It)" feat. Lee Eun-joo	Yes	—N/a	Yes	Brave Brothers	—N/a
2006	Since 2007	"She Can't Get Enough"	Yes	Kim Ina	No	Carlos Adaamick Mendoza, Robbi Nevil, Bradley Spalter, Michael Norfleet, Jean Rodriguez, Wesley Rodriguez, Phillip White	—N/a
2006	Since 2007	"Dirty Cash"	Yes	072	No	Andy Love, Jos Jorgensen	—N/a
2007	Always	"We Are Big Bang"	Yes	BigBang	No	Perry	—N/a
2007	Always	"거짓말 (Lies)"	Yes	—N/a	Yes	—N/a	—N/a
2007	Always	"Oh Ma Baby"	Yes	—N/a	Yes	Brave Brothers	—N/a
2007	Always	"Always"	Yes	Teddy Park	No	Teddy Park, Perry	—N/a
2007	Hot Issue	"Hot Issue (Intro)" feat. CL	Yes	—N/a	Yes	—N/a	—N/a
2007	Hot Issue	"바보 (Fool)"	Yes	—N/a	Yes	—N/a	—N/a
2007	Hot Issue	"But I Love U"	Yes	—N/a	Yes	S-Kush	Sampling Redd Holt Unlimited's "Rhu"
2007	Hot Issue	"I Don't Understand"	Yes	—N/a	No	Choi Pil Kang	—N/a
2007	Hot Issue	"Crazy Dog"	Yes	—N/a	Yes	Perry, Brave Brothers	Sampling from Seo Taiji & Boys' "In My Fantasy"
2007	Hot Issue	"마지막 인사 (Last Farewell)"	Yes	—N/a	Yes	Brave Brothers	—N/a
2008	For the World	"How Gee"	Yes	Perry, BigBang	Yes	Perry, BigBang	—N/a
2008	With U	"Intro"	Yes	Perry	Yes	Perry	—N/a
2008	With U	"With U"	Yes	Perry	Yes	Perry	—N/a
2008	Global Warming Tour DVD	"언제까지 (Until Whenever)"	Yes	—N/a	No	Kim Do-hyun	—N/a
2008	Stand Up	"Intro (Stand Up)"	Yes	T.O.P.	Yes	KUSH, Teddy	—N/a
2008	Stand Up	"하루하루 (Day by Day)"	Yes	—N/a	Yes	Daishi Dance	—N/a
2008	Stand Up	"천국 (Heaven)"	Yes	—N/a	Yes	Daishi Dance	—N/a
2008	Stand Up	"Lady"	Yes	—N/a	Yes	Teddy	—N/a
2008	Stand Up	"Oh My Friend" feat.No Brain	Yes	—N/a	Yes	No Brain	—N/a
2008	Remember	"모두 다 소리쳐 (Everybody Scream (Intro))"	Yes	—N/a	Yes	KUSH	—N/a
2008	Remember	"오. 아. 오 (Oh, Ah, Oh)"	Yes	—N/a	Yes	Teddy	—N/a
2008	Remember	"붉은 노을 (Sunset Glow)"	Yes	Lee Hyunghon	Yes	Lee Hyunghon, Teddy	Remake of the Lee Moon-se single of the same name
2008	Remember	"반짝 반짝 (Twinkle Twinkle)"	Yes	KUSH, T.O.P.	No	KUSH	—N/a
2008	Remember	"Strong Baby"	Yes	—N/a	Yes	Bae Jin Yeol	—N/a
2008	Remember	"Wonderful"	Yes	T.O.P.	Yes	Brave Brothers	—N/a
2008	Remember	"멍청한 사랑 (Foolish Love)"	Yes	—N/a	No	Choi Kyusung, KUSH	—N/a
2009	My Heaven	"Emotion"	Yes	Komu	No	Jimmy Thornfeldt, Mohombi, Perry Borja	—N/a
2009	ガラガラ Go!! (Gara Gara Go!!)	"ガラガラ Go!! (Gara Gara Go!!)"	No	Shion, Ritchii, Big Ron	Yes	Jimmy Thornfeldt, Mohombi	—N/a
2009	Big Bang	"Intro"	No	—N/a	Yes	Jimmy Thornfeldt	Instrumental
2009	Big Bang	"Bringing You Love"	Yes	—N/a	No	Jimmy Thornfeldt	—N/a
2009	Big Bang	"Love Club"	No	—N/a	Yes	Jimmy Thornfeldt	—N/a
2011	Tonight	"Intro (Thank You & You)"	Yes	T.O.P	Yes	Choice37	—N/a
2011	Tonight	"Hands Up"	Yes	T.O.P	Yes	e.knock	—N/a
2011	Tonight	"Tonight"	Yes	T.O.P	Yes	e.knock	—N/a
2011	Tonight	"Somebody to Love"	Yes	T.O.P	Yes	Ham Seung-chun, Kang Wook-jin	—N/a
2011	Tonight	"What is Right"	Yes	T.O.P	Yes	D.J Murf, PEEJAY	—N/a
2011	Tonight	"Café"	Yes	T.O.P	Yes	D.J Murf, PEEJAY	—N/a
2011	Big Bang Special Edition	"Love Song"	Yes	Teddy, T.O.P.	Yes	Teddy	—N/a
2011	Big Bang Special Edition	"Stupid Liar"	Yes	T.O.P.	Yes	Choi Pil-kang	—N/a
2011	Big Bang 2	"Beautiful Hangover"	Yes	Shikata, Inozzi, Perry	No	Perry, Saeed Molavi, Nadir Benkahla	—N/a
2012	Alive	"Intro (Alive)"	Yes	Teddy	Yes	Teddy, Dee.P	—N/a
2012	Alive	"Blue"	Yes	Teddy, T.O.P.	Yes	Teddy	—N/a
2012	Alive	"사랑먼지 (Love Dust)"	Yes	Teddy, T.O.P.	Yes	Teddy	—N/a
2012	Alive	"Bad Boy"	Yes	T.O.P.	Yes	Choice37	—N/a
2012	Alive	v재미없어 (Ain't No Fun)"	Yes	T.O.P.	Yes	DJ Murf, Peejay	—N/a
2012	Alive	"Fantastic Baby"	Yes	T.O.P.	Yes	Teddy	—N/a
2012	Alive	"날개 (Wings)"	Yes	Daesung	Yes	Choi Pil-kang	—N/a
2012	Still Alive	"Ego"	Yes	T.O.P	Yes	Ham Seung Cheon, Kang Wook Jin	—N/a
2012	Still Alive	"Feeling"	Yes	T.O.P	Yes	Boys Noize	—N/a
2012	Still Alive	"Still Alive"	Yes	Teddy, T.O.P.	Yes	Teddy, Dee.P	—N/a
2012	Still Alive	"Monster"	Yes	T.O.P	Yes	Choi Pil-kang	—N/a
2012	Still Alive	"빙글빙글 (Bingle Bingle)"	Yes	T.O.P	Yes	Teddy, So Won-jin	—N/a
2015	MADE	"Loser"	Yes	Teddy, T.O.P	No	Teddy, Taeyang	—N/a
2015	MADE	"Bae Bae"	Yes	Teddy, T.O.P	Yes	Teddy, T.O.P	—N/a
2015	MADE	"Bang Bang Bang"	Yes	Teddy, T.O.P	Yes	Teddy	—N/a
2015	MADE	"We Like 2 Party"	Yes	Teddy, Kush, T.O.P	Yes	Teddy, Kush, Seo Won Jin	—N/a
2015	MADE	"If You"	Yes	—N/a	Yes	P.K, Dee.P	—N/a
2015	MADE	"맨정신 (Sober)"	Yes	Teddy, T.O.P	Yes	Teddy, Choice37	—N/a
2015	MADE	"쩔어 (Zutter)"	Yes	Teddy, T.O.P	Yes	Teddy, T.O.P	—N/a
2015	MADE	"우리 사랑하지 말아요 (Let’s Not Fall in Love)"	Yes	Teddy	Yes	Teddy	—N/a
2016	MADE	"에라 모르겠다 (FXXK IT)"	Yes	Teddy, T.O.P	Yes	Teddy, R.Tee	—N/a
2016	MADE	"Last Dance"	Yes	T.O.P, Taeyang	Yes	Jeon Yong Jun	—N/a
2016	MADE	"Girlfriend"	Yes	Teddy, T.O.P	Yes	Teddy, Choice37	—N/a
2018	—N/a	"Flower Road"	Yes	T.O.P	Yes	The Fliptones	BigBang's digital single
2022	—N/a	"Still Life"	Yes	T.O.P, Kush	Yes	T.O.P, Kush, VVN, Vince, Seo Won-jin, 24	BigBang's digital single
2026	—N/a	"BiiiG"	Yes	lil aaron & Kaine	Yes	lil aaron, Kaine, KUSH (쿠시), IDO (KOR), TARZZAN, 24 & Teddy Park	BigBang's digital single

== Solo albums ==
Year	Album	Song	Lyrics		Music	
Year	Album	Song	Credited	With	Credited	With
2009	Heartbreaker	"소년이여 (A Boy)"	Yes	—N/a	Yes	Choice37
2009	Heartbreaker	"Heartbreaker"	Yes	—N/a	Yes	Jimmy Thornfelt
2009	Heartbreaker	"Breathe"	Yes	—N/a	Yes	Jimmy Thornfelt
2009	Heartbreaker	"Butterfly" feat. Jin Jung	Yes	—N/a	Yes	Choice37
2009	Heartbreaker	"Hello" feat. Sandara Park	Yes	—N/a	Yes	KUSH
2009	Heartbreaker	"Gossip Man" feat. Kim Gun-mo	Yes	—N/a	Yes	Teddy
2009	Heartbreaker	"Korean Dream" feat. Taeyang	Yes	—N/a	Yes	Jimmy Thornfelt
2009	Heartbreaker	"The Leaders" feat. Teddy Park & CL	Yes	Teddy, CL	No	Teddy
2009	Heartbreaker	"She's Gone" feat. KUSH	Yes	—N/a	Yes	KUSH
2009	Heartbreaker	"1년 정거장 (1 Year Station)"	Yes	—N/a	Yes	KUSH
2010	GD & TOP	"Intro"	Yes	T.O.P.	Yes	T.O.P., e.knock
2010	GD & TOP	"High High"	Yes	Teddy, T.O.P.	No	Teddy
2010	GD & TOP	"Oh Yeah" feat. Park Bom	Yes	T.O.P., Teddy	Yes	Teddy, Sunwoo Jungah
2010	GD & TOP	"집에 가지마 (Don't Leave)"	Yes	—N/a	Yes	Teddy, e.knock
2010	GD & TOP	"Baby Goodnight"	Yes	T.O.P.	Yes	T.O.P., e.knock, 1 ON
2010	GD & TOP	"뻑이가요 (Knock Out)"	Yes	T.O.P.	Yes	T.O.P., Diplo
2010	GD & TOP	"악몽 (Obsession)"	Yes	—N/a	Yes	e.knock
2010	GD & TOP	"어쩌란 말이냐? (What Do You Want?)"	Yes	—N/a	Yes	e.knock
2012	One of a Kind	"One of a Kind"	Yes	—N/a	Yes	Choice37
2012	One of a Kind	"그 XX (That XX)"	Yes	Teddy	Yes	Teddy
2012	One of a Kind	"크레용 (Crayon)"	Yes	Teddy	Yes	Teddy
2012	One of a Kind	"결국 (Without You)" feat. Rosé	Yes	—N/a	Yes	Ham Seung-chon, Kang Wook-jin
2012	One of a Kind	"Missing You" feat. Kim Yoon Ah	Yes	Teddy	Yes	Choi Pil-kang
2012	One of a Kind	"Today" feat. Kim Jong Wan	Yes	—N/a	Yes	Choice37
2012	One of a Kind	"불 불 여봐라 (Light It Up)" feat. Tablo, Dok2	Yes	Tablo, Dok2	Yes	Teddy
2013	Coup d'Etat	"Coup d'Etat" feat. Diplo, Baauer	Yes	—N/a	Yes	Diplo, Baauer
2013	Coup d'Etat	"늴리리야 (Niliria)" feat. Missy Elliott)	Yes	Missy Elliott	Yes	Teddy, Missy Elliott
2013	Coup d'Etat	"늴리리야 (Niliria)"	Yes	Teddy	Yes	Teddy, Missy Elliott
2013	Coup d'Etat	"R.O.D" feat. Lydia Paek	Yes	Teddy, Choice37	No	Teddy
2013	Coup d'Etat	"니가 뭔데 (Who You?)"	Yes	—N/a	Yes	KUSH
2013	Coup d'Etat	"Black" feat. Jennie Kim	Yes	Teddy	No	Teddy
2013	Coup d'Etat	"Black" feat. Sky Ferreira	Yes	Teddy	No	Teddy
2013	Coup d'Etat	"세상을 흔들어 (Shake the World)"	Yes	—N/a	Yes	Choice37
2013	Coup d'Etat	"미치Go (MichiGO)"	Yes	—N/a	Yes	Ham Seung-Cheon, PK
2013	Coup d'Etat	"삐딱하게 (Crooked)"	Yes	Teddy	Yes	Teddy
2013	Coup d'Etat	"Runaway"	Yes	—N/a	Yes	Dee. P
2013	Coup d'Etat	"너무 좋아 (I Love It)" feat. Zion T)	Yes	—N/a	Yes	Boys Noize, Siriusmo
2013	Coup d'Etat	"You Do (Outro)"	Yes	—N/a	Yes	Choice37
2013	Coup d'Etat	"Window"	Yes	Teddy	Yes	Choice37, Teddy
2017	Kwon Ji Yong	"Middle Fingers-Up"	Yes	—N/a	Yes	24, Kush
2017	Kwon Ji Yong	"Bullshit"	Yes	—N/a	Yes	Teddy, Cawlr, Future Bounce, Choice37
2017	Kwon Ji Yong	"Super Star"	Yes	Teddy, Joe Rhee	Yes	Teddy, Joe Rhee, 24, Choice37, Future Bounce, Seo Won Jin
2017	Kwon Ji Yong	"Untitled, 2014"	Yes	—N/a	Yes	Choice37
2017	Kwon Ji Yong	"Divina Commedia"	Yes	8!, Brian Lee, Safe, Frank Dukes	Yes	8!, Brain Lee, Frank Dukes, Safe
2025	Übermensch	"Home Sweet Home"	Yes	Teddy, Choice37	Yes	VVN, Teddy, Kush, 24
2025	Übermensch	"Power"	Yes	—N/a	Yes	Tommy Brown, Theron Thomas, Steven Franks
2025	Übermensch	"Too Bad" feat. Anderson .Paak	Yes	Anderson .Paak	Yes	Anderson .Paak, U Ebong, Alissia, Yohan, J. Lenox
2025	Übermensch	"Drama"	Yes	Diane Warren, CHOICE37	No	Diane Warren
2025	Übermensch	"IBELONGIIU"	Yes	Jean-Baptiste Kouame, Maegan Cottone	Yes	Alexander Ridha, Jean-Baptiste Kouame, Maegan Cottone
2025	Übermensch	"Take me"	Yes	—N/a	Yes	Alexander Ridha, Dominic “Mocky” Salole
2025	Übermensch	"보나마나 BONAMANA"	Yes	—N/a	Yes	Brandon “STIX” Salaam Bailey, Michael Warren, CHOICE37
2025	Übermensch	"Gyro-drop"	Yes	Gaeko, Gamal Lewis	Yes	Alexander Ridha, Gamal Lewis, Jeremy Coleman, Xavier de Rosnay

== Other work ==
Year	Album	Song	Lyrics		Music		Notes
Year	Album	Song	Credited	With	Credited	With	Notes
2001	Perry by Storm	"Storm" feat. G-Dragon, Sean, Masta Wu	Yes	Yang Hyun Suk, Perry, Sean, Masta Wu	No	Perry	Perry's album
2001	Perry by Storm	"G-Dragon"	Yes	Perry, Masta Wu	No	Perry	Perry's album
2002	Why Be Normal?	"Why Be Normal"	Yes	Perry, Masta Wu	No	Perry	YG Family's album
2002	Why Be Normal?	"Unfold at a Higher Place" with Taeyang	Yes	Taeyang	No	Perry	YG Family's album
2007	Soul Family With Johan	"So In Love, Pt. 2" feat. G-Dragon	Yes	Seong Nakho	No	Fractal	George Han Kim's album (rap making)
2007	Rush	"Super Fly" feat. T.O.P., G-Dragon, Taeyang	Yes	BigBang, Lexy	No	Perry	Lexy's album
2008	non-album single	"날 봐, 귀순 (Look At Me, Gwisun)"	Yes	—N/a	Yes	KUSH	Daesung's digital single
2008	FILA Limited Edition with BIGBANG	"Stylish"	Yes	—N/a	No	Perry	digital single for FILA sponsorship
2008	Hot	"Intro"	Yes	—N/a	Yes	Brave Brothers	Taeyang's solo album
2008	Hot	"Baby, I'm Sorry"	Yes	—N/a	No	Jeon Seung Woo	Taeyang's solo album
2008	Made in R.O.K	"What" feat. G-Dragon, Teddy, Kush, Perry, CL	Yes	Perry, Teddy, Kush, Digital Master, Masta Wu, CL	No	Kush	YMGA's album
2008	D.I.S.C.O	"Party" feat. G-Dragon	Yes	—N/a	Yes	Yoo Gun Hyung	Uhm Jung-hwa's album
2008	non-album single	"D.I.S.C.O Part 2" feat. G-Dragon	Yes	Teddy	No	Teddy, Kush	Uhm Jung-hwa's digital single (rap making)
2008	non-album single	"Only Look At Me Pt. 2"	Yes	Teddy	No	Teddy, Kush	G-Dragon's digital single
2009	non-album single	"대박이야! (A Big Hit!)"	Yes	—N/a	Yes	—N/a	Daesung's digital single
2009	Iris Soundtrack (Part 3)	"할렐루야 (Hallelujah)"	Yes	—N/a	Yes	Teddy, Kush	OST song
2009	non-album single	"So Fresh, So Cool"	Yes	—N/a	No	Perry	BigBang's promotional song for Hite Brewery
2010	non-album single	"Lollipop Pt. 2"	Yes	Teddy, T.O.P.	No	Teddy	BigBang's digital LG promotional single
2010	Solar	"I Need A Girl" feat. G-Dragon	Yes	Jeon Goon	No	Jeon Goon	Taeyang's album (rap making)
2010	Solar	"니가 잠든 후에 (After You Fall Asleep)" feat. Swings	Yes	Swings	Yes	Choice37	Taeyang's album
2010	non-album single	"G-Market"	Yes	—N/a	Yes	e.knock	Recorded as an advertisement for G-Market
2011	Infinite Challenge – West Coast Expressway Music Festival	"바람났어 (I Cheated)" with Park Myung Soo feat. Park Bom	Yes	Teddy, e.knock	Yes	Teddy, e.knock	Recorded for Infinite Challenge's West Coast Highway Music Festival
2011	V.V.I.P	"창문을 열어 (Open the Window)" feat. G-Dragon	Yes	Choi Pil-kang	No	Choi Pil-kang	Seungri's solo album (rap making)
2011	V.V.I.P	"어쩌라고 (What Can I Do)"	Yes	Seungri	No	Seungri, Choi Pil-kang, Big Tone	Seungri's solo album (rap making)
2011	non-album single	"The North Face Song"	Yes	—N/a	Yes	Kush	BigBang's promotional song for The North Face Korea
2012	싸이6甲 part1	"청개구리 (Tree frog)" feat. G-Dragon	Yes	Psy	No	Psy, Yoo Gun Hyung	Psy's album (rap making)
2013	Infinite Challenge – Jayu-ro Song Festival	"해볼라고 (Going To Try)" with Jeong Hyeong-don feat. Defconn	Yes	Hyeong-don	Yes	Teddy, Choice37	Recorded for Infinite Challenge's Freeway Song Festival
2013	Let's Talk About Love	"Let's Talk About Love" ft G-Dragon & Taeyang	Yes	Seungri, Taeyang	Yes	Seungri, Ham Seung-Chun, Ukjin Kang, Taeyang	Seungri's solo album
2014	Crush	"Good To You"	Yes	Teddy	No	Teddy, Choice 37	2NE1's Album
2014	Rise	"링가링가 (Ringa Linga)"	Yes	Dok2	Yes	Shockbit	Taeyang's solo album
2014	Rise	"Stay With Me"	Yes	—N/a	Yes	The Fliptones, JHart	Taeyang's solo album
2014	D'slove	"Shut Up"	Yes	Kenn Kato	No	Seung Cheon Ham, Uk Jin Kang, Bigtone	Daesung's Japanese solo album
2014	Recess	"Dirty Vibe" feat. G-Dragon, CL & Diplo	Yes	CL	No	Skrillex, Diplo	Skrillex album (rap making)
2014	Good Boy	"Good Boy"	Yes	—N/a	Yes	The Fliptones, Freedo	GD X TAEYANG for YG Hip-Hop Project
2015	non-album single	"Live Twice"	Yes	—N/a	No	Kush, Seo Won Jin	BigBang's Made World Tour Trailer
2015	Infinite Challenge – Yeongdong Expressway Music Festival	"무한도전 (Mapsosa)" with Taeyang & Hwang Kwanghee	Yes	Teddy	Yes	Teddy	Recorded for Infinite Challenge's Yeongdong Expressway Music Festival
2015	Welcome Back	"I Miss You So Bad"	Yes	B.I, Bobby	Yes	Dee. P	iKON's debut album
2017	OO	"Complex" feat. G-Dragon	Yes	Zion.T, DJ Dopsh	No	Zion.T, Peejay, SLOM	Zion.T's album (rap making)
2017	Palette	"팔레트 (Palette)" feat. G-Dragon	Yes	IU	No	IU	IU's album (rap making)
2017	4X2=8	"팩트폭행 (Fact Assault)" feat. G-Dragon	Yes	Psy	No	Psy, Yoo Gun-hyung	Psy's album (rap making)
2024	Drip	“Drip”	No	Wikström, YG, Airplay, Masta Wu, Choice37, Sonny	Yes	Airplay, Illjun, Wikström, G-Dragon	Babymonster’s debut studio album
2025	non-album single	“Hando-Chogua”	Yes	Kush, Daesung	Yes	Kush, Nohc, 24, Daesung	Daesung’s digital single
2025	non-album single	“Cha Cha Cha”	Yes	Vince, VVN, Kush	Yes	Nohc, 24, Vince, VVN, Dominsuk, Kush	Vince’s digital single
2026	Lemonade	“WDA (Whole Different Animal)”	Yes	Jvde Milez	Yes	Dem Jointz, Smitty, Ryan S. Jhun	Aespa’s album
