= G-Dragon videography =

G-Dragon video discography
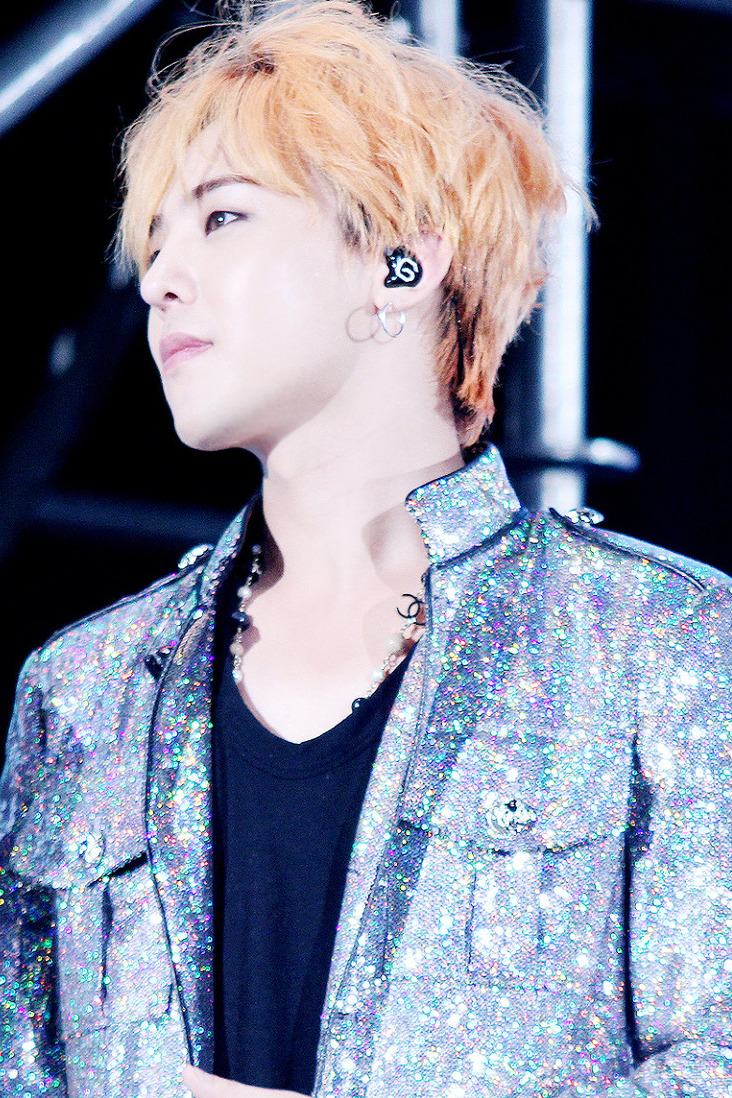
- G-Dragon on Infinite Challenge Yeongdong Expressway Music Festival 2015
- Music videos: 21
- Concert tour videos: 5
- Documentaries: 1
- Vinly LP: 2

The videography of South Korean rapper G-Dragon, consists of 21 music videos, 5 concert tour videos, two vinyl LPs, and one documentary DVD. He has sold over 100,000 physical DVDs/Blu-rays in Japan and South Korea alone.

== Music videos ==
=== As lead artist ===
Year	Title	Album	Director(s)
2001	"My Age is 13"	Hip Hop Flex	—
2009	"Heartbreaker"	Heartbreaker	Seo Hyun-seung
2009	"Breathe"	Heartbreaker	—
2009	"She's Gone"	Heartbreaker	—
2009	"Butterfly"	Heartbreaker	—
2009	"A Boy"	Heartbreaker	—
2012	"One of a Kind"	One of a Kind	Seo Hyun-seung
2012	"That XX"	One of a Kind	Han Sa Min
2012	"Crayon"	One of a Kind	Seo Hyun-seung
2013	"MichiGO"	Coup d'Etat	Seo Hyun-seung
2013	"Coup d'Etat"	Coup d'Etat	Seo Hyun-seung
2013	"Crooked"	Coup d'Etat	Han Sa Min
2013	"Who You?"	Coup d'Etat	Han Sa Min
2017	"Untitled, 2014"	Kwon Ji Yong	Han Sa Min
2024	"Power"	Übermensch	Kwon Yong-so (Saccharin Film)

=== Collaborations ===
Year	Title	Artist(s)	Album	Director
2001	"Storm"	Perry (feat. G-Dragon, Masta Wu, Sean)	Perry by Storm	—
2002	"Hip Hop Gentlemen"	YG Family	Why Be Normal?	—
2002	"YMCA Baseball Team"	YG Family	Why Be Normal?	—
2009	"Rain Is Fallin'"	W-Inds.	Rain Is Fallin'/Hybrid Dream	—
2009	"Strong Baby"	Seungri	Remember	—
2010	"I Need a Girl"	Taeyang (feat. G-Dragon)	Solar	—
2014	"Dirty Vibe"	Skrillex with Diplo, CL and G-Dragon	Recess	Lil’ Internet
2014	"Good Boy"	GD X Taeyang	—	Colin Tilley
2015	"Zutter"	GD & TOP	Made	Seo Hyun-Seung

== Video albums ==
=== Concert tour videos ===
Title	Album details	Peak chart positions		Sales & Certifications
Title	Album details	JPN		Sales & Certifications
Title	Album details	DVD	Blu-ray	Sales & Certifications
1st Live Concert : Shine A Light	Released: KOR: 20 April 2010; JPN: 24 April 2010; Languages: Korean; Labels: YG Entertainment; Format: DVD	19	—	JPN: 5,886
G-Dragon World Tour DVD [One Of A Kind in Seoul]	Released: KOR: 13 September 2013; JPN: 18 September 2013; Languages: Korean; Labels: YG Entertainment; Format: DVD	6	—	JPN: 12,235
G-Dragon World Tour One Of A Kind In Japan Dome Special	Released: 20 November 2013; Languages: Japanese; Labels: YG Entertainment; Format: DVD, Blu-ray	3	6	JPN: 27,987
G-Dragon World Tour DVD [One Of A Kind THE FINAL in Seoul + World Tour]	Released: 12 February 2014 (JPN); Languages: Korean; Labels: YG Entertainment; Format: DVD	8	—	JPN: 3,480
One Of A Kind 3D ～One Of A Kind 2013 1st World tour～ DVD	Released: 21 April 2014; Languages: Korean; Labels: YG Entertainment; Format: DVD, Blu-ray	35	32	JPN: 2,138
G-Dragon 2017 World Tour <Act III, M.O.T.T.E> In Japan	Released: 7 February 2018; Languages: Japanese; Labels: YGEX; Format: DVD, Blu-ray	1	2	JPN: 18,310; CHN: 39,400
"—" denotes releases that did not chart or were not released in that region.

=== Documentaries ===
Title	Album details	Peak chart positions	Sales & Certifications
Title	Album details	JPN DVD	Sales & Certifications
BIGBANG 1st Documentary DVD <Extra Ordinary 20’S>	Released: June 25, 2012 (JPN); Re-released: June 25, 2014; Language: Japanese; Labels: YG Entertainment, YGEX; Format: DVD	27	—

=== Other releases ===
Title	Album details	Peak chart positions	Sales & Certifications
Title	Album details	JPN DVD	Sales & Certifications
G-Dragon's Collection DVD: One Of A Kind	Released: KOR: 2 April 2013; JPN: 27 March 2013; Languages: Korean, Japanese; Labels: YG Entertainment; Format: DVD	9	JPN: 12,880
G-Dragon's Collection DVD II: Coup D'Etat	Released: KOR: 24 December 2013; JPN: 25 December 2013; Languages: Korean, Japanese; Labels: YG Entertainment; Format: DVD	26	JPN: 4,683
G-Dragon × Taeyang in Paris 2014	Released: 18 June 2014; Languages: Korean, Japanese; Labels: YG Entertainment; Format: DVD	8	JPN: 6,033

=== Featured releases ===
Title	Album details	Peak chart positions		Sales & Certifications
Title	Album details	JPN		Sales & Certifications
Title	Album details	DVD	Blu-ray	Sales & Certifications
YG Family Making Film & Calendar + Diary	Released: December 29, 2010 (JPN); Language: Japanese; Labels: Universal Music Japan; Format: DVD	14	—	—
YG Family Live Concert 2010 DVD+MAKING BOOK	Released: June 1, 2011 (JPN); Language: Japanese; Labels: Universal Music Japan; Format: DVD	14	—	—
15th Anniversary YG Family Concert in Seoul 2011	Released: June 13, 2012 (JPN); Language: Japanese; Labels: YGEX; Format: DVD	10	—	—
2012 YG Family Concert in Japan	Released: August 8, 2012 (JPN); Language: Japanese; Labels: YGEX; Format: DVD	3	—	—
YG Family World Tour 2014 -Power- in Japan	Released: January 7, 2015 (JPN); Language: Japanese; Labels: YGEX; Format: DVD, Blu-ray	2	8	JPN: 13,058

== Filmography ==
Title	Year	Role	Notes
Big Bang Made	2016	Himself	Documentary

== See also ==
- G-Dragon discography
- G-Dragon filmography
