= Coup d'Etat + One of a Kind & Heartbreaker =

Compilation album by G-Dragon
- Released: November 27, 2013
- Recorded: 2009–2013
- Genres: K-pop; hip-hop; pop
- Length: 47:31
- Languages: Korean; Japanese
- Label: YGEX
- Producers: G-Dragon; Teddy

G-Dragon chronology
Coup d'Etat (2013)	Coup d'Etat + One of a Kind & Heartbreaker (2013)	Kwon Ji Yong (2017)

Coup d'Etat + One of a Kind & Heartbreaker (stylized in all caps) is the first Japanese compilation album by South Korean artist G-Dragon, member of the K-pop group Big Bang. The album was released on November 27, 2013, and is a compilation of his studio discography from 2009, containing his then-recently released second studio album Coup d'Etat (2013), as well as the EP One of a Kind (2012), and his first album Heartbreaker (2009). It was released in multiple editions ranging from regular CD, DVD, and Playbutton.

The album features collaborations from various artists such as Missy Elliott, Sky Ferreira, Zion.T, Lydia Paek, Park Bom of 2NE1, and Rosé and Jennie Kim from Blackpink.

== Release ==
The album was released in three editions. All editions come with a serial access code to view rehearsal footage from Big Bang's Japan Dome Tour. The first press limited edition includes two CDs, DVD, photo book, and a sports towel. The DVD contains eleven music videos and the making of the "Who You?" music video. The Playbutton edition contains only the Coup d'Etat album on a Playbutton MP3 player.

== Track listing ==
=== Disc 1 ===
Coup d'Etat + One of a Kind & Heartbreaker – disc 1
No.	Title	Lyrics	Music	Arrangement	Length
1.	"Coup d'Etat" (featuring Diplo and Baauer)	G-Dragon	G-Dragon, Diplo, Baauer	Diplo, Baauer	2:58
2.	"Niliria" (featuring Missy Elliott)	G-Dragon, Missy Elliott	Teddy, G-Dragon, Missy Elliott	Teddy	2:52
3.	"R.O.D." (featuring Lydia Paek)	Teddy, G-Dragon, Choice37	Teddy	Teddy	3:56
4.	"Black" (Japanese version featuring Bom from 2NE1)	Teddy, G-Dragon, Verbal	Teddy	Teddy	3:23
5.	"Who You?" (Japanese version)	G-Dragon, Verbal	G-Dragon, Kush	Kush, Choice37	3:21
6.	"Shake the World"	G-Dragon	G-Dragon, Choice37	Choice37	2:55
7.	"Going Crazy" (ミチGO; Michigo)	G-Dragon	G-Dragon, Ham Seung-Cheon, Kang Wook-Jin	Ham Seung-Cheon, Kang Wook-Jin	3:28
8.	"ピタカゲ (Crooked)" (Japanese version)	G-Dragon, Teddy, Verbal	G-Dragon, Teddy	Teddy	3:45
9.	"Niliria" (G-Dragon version)	G-Dragon, Teddy	Teddy, G-Dragon, Missy Elliott	Teddy	2:52
10.	"Runaway"	G-Dragon	G-Dragon, Dee.P	Dee.P	3:21
11.	"I Love It" (featuring Zion.T and Boys Noize)	G-Dragon	G-Dragon, Boys Noize, Siriusmo	Boys Noize, Siriusmo	3:15
12.	"You Do (Outro)"	G-Dragon	G-Dragon, Choice37	Choice37	2:38
13.	"Window"	G-Dragon, Teddy	G-Dragon, Choice37, Teddy	Choice37	3:47
14.	"Black" (featuring Sky Ferreira)	G-Dragon, Teddy	Teddy	Teddy	3:24
15.	"That Guy" (あんなヤツ; Anna Yatsu bonus track)	G-Dragon, Verbal	G-Dragon, Teddy, Seo Wonjin	Teddy	3:19

Coup d'Etat + One of a Kind & Heartbreaker – Standard version (bonus tracks)
No.	Title	Lyrics	Music	Arrangement	Length
16.	"Black" (Korean version featuring Jennie Kim of Blackpink)	Teddy, G-Dragon	Teddy	Teddy	3:23
17.	"Who You?" (Korean version)	G-Dragon	G-Dragon, Kush	Kush, Choice37	3:21
18.	"Crooked" (Korean version)	Teddy, G-Dragon	Teddy, G-Dragon	Teddy	3:45

=== Disc 2 ===
Coup d'Etat + One of a Kind & Heartbreaker – disc 2
No.	Title	Lyrics	Music	Arrangement	Length
1.	"One of a Kind"	G-Dragon	G-Dragon, Choice37	Choice37	3:26
2.	"Crayon" (크레용; Keureyong)	G-Dragon, Teddy	G-Dragon, Teddy	Teddy	3:17
3.	"Without You" (결국; Gyeolguk featuring Rosé of Blackpink)	G-Dragon	G-Dragon, Ham Seungchun, Kang Wookjin	Ham Seungchun, Kang Wookjin	4:03
4.	"That XX" (그 XX; Geu XX)	G-Dragon, Teddy	G-Dragon, Teddy, Seo Wonjin	Teddy	3:20
5.	"Missing You" (featuring Kim Yoon Ah)	G-Dragon, Teddy	G-Dragon, Teddy, Choi Pil Kang	Choi Pilkang	3:27
6.	"Today" (featuring Kim Jong Wan)	G-Dragon	G-Dragon, Choice37	Choice37	3:39
7.	"Light it Up" (불 붙여봐라; Bul Butyeobwara featuring Tablo and Dok2)	G-Dragon, Tablo, Dok2	G-Dragon, Teddy, Tablo, Dok2	Teddy	3:34
8.	"A Boy" (소년이여; Sonyeoniyeo)	G-Dragon	G-Dragon, Choice37	Choice37	3:29
9.	"Heartbreaker"	G-Dragon	G-Dragon, Jimmy Thornfelt	Jimmy Thornfeldt	3:22
10.	"Breathe"	G-Dragon	G-Dragon, Jimmy Thornfelt	Jimmy Thornfeldt	3:27
11.	"Butterfly" (featuring Jin Jung)	G-Dragon	Choice37, G-Dragon	Choice37	3:42
12.	"Hello" (featuring Dara of 2NE1)	G-Dragon	Kush, G-Dragon	Kush	3:17
13.	"Gossip Man" (featuring Kim Gunmo)	G-Dragon	Teddy, G-Dragon	Teddy	3:31
14.	"Korean Dream" (featuring Taeyang)	G-Dragon	G-Dragon, Jimmy Thornfelt	Jimmy Thornfeldt	3:16
15.	"The Leaders" (featuring Teddy and CL of 2NE1)	G-Dragon, Teddy, CL	Teddy	Teddy	3:48
16.	"She's Gone" (featuring Kush)	G-Dragon	Kush, G-Dragon	Kush	3:44
17.	"1 Year Station" (1년 정거장; Ilnyeon Jeonggeojang)	G-Dragon	Kush, G-Dragon	Kush	4:04

=== DVD ===
Coup d'Etat + One of a Kind & Heartbreaker – disc 3
No.	Title	Director(s)	Length
1.	"Who You?" (music video)	Han Sa Min	5:38
2.	"Crooked" (ピタカゲ; music video)	Han Sa Min	3:46
3.	"Coup D'Etat" (music video)	Seo Hyun-Seung	3:22
4.	"Michigo" (ミチGO; music video)	Seo Hyun-Seung	3:43
5.	"Crayon" (music video)	Seo Hyun-Seung	3:45
6.	"Anna Yatsu" (あんなヤツ; music video)	Han Sa Min	3:35
7.	"One of a Kind" (music video)	Seo Hyun-Seung	3:29
8.	"A Boy" (music video)		3:43
9.	"Butterfly" (music video)		3:51
10.	"Breathe" (music video)		3:41
11.	"Heartbreaker" (music video)	Seo Hyun-Seung	3:49
12.	"Making of "Who You?""		20:02

Samples

- "Coup d'Etat" contains a vocal sample of "The Revolution Will Not Be Televised" performed by Gil Scott-Heron.
- "Niliria" contains elements of a traditional Korean folk song of the same name.

== Certifications ==
Certifications for Coup d'Etat + One of a Kind & Heartbreaker
Region	Certification	Certified units/sales
Japan (RIAJ)	Gold	100,000^{^}
^{^} Shipments figures based on certification alone.
