= List of M Countdown Chart winners (2013) =

List of M Countdown Chart winners

M Countdown Chart winners (2013)

The M Countdown Chart is a record chart on the South Korean Mnet television music program M Countdown. Every week, the show awards the best-performing single on the chart in the country during its live broadcast.

In 2013, 30 singles ranked number one on the chart and 24 music acts were awarded first-place trophies. Eight songs collected trophies for three weeks and achieved a triple crown: "Caffeine" by Yang Yo-seob, "I Got a Boy" by Girls' Generation, "Gone Not Around Any Longer" by Sistar19, "Dream Girl" by Shinee, "Gentleman" by Psy, "This Love" by Shinhwa, "Give It to Me" by Sistar, and "Growl" by Exo. Of all releases for the year, only one song earned a perfect score of 10,000 points: "I Got a Boy" by Girls' Generation.

== Scoring system ==
Digital Single Sales 50%, Album Sales 10%, Age Preference 20%, Global Fan Vote 5%, Live Show Preferences 10%, SMS Vote 5%.

== Chart history ==
Key
| | Triple Crown |
| | Highest score of the year |
| — | No show was held |

| Date | Artist | Song | Points | Ref. |
|---|---|---|---|---|
| January 3 | Yang Yo-seob | "Caffeine" | 9,795 | |
| January 10 | Girls' Generation | "I Got a Boy" | 10,000 | |
| January 17 | Girls' Generation | "I Got a Boy" | 9,988 | |
| January 24 | Girls' Generation | "I Got a Boy" | 8,367 | |
| January 31 | Baechigi | "Shower Of Tears" | 8,326 | |
| February 7 | Sistar19 | "Gone Not Around Any Longer" | 8,086 | |
| February 14 | Sistar19 | "Gone Not Around Any Longer" | 9,642 | |
| February 21 | Sistar19 | "Gone Not Around Any Longer" | 9,140 | |
| February 28 | Shinee | "Dream Girl" | 9,168 | |
| March 7 | Shinee | "Dream Girl" | 9,459 | |
| March 14 | Shinee | "Dream Girl" | 8,403 | |
| March 21 | Lee Hi | "It's Over" | 8,449 | |
| March 28 | Davichi | "Just The Two Of Us" | 7,263 | |
| April 4 | Infinite | "Man In Love" | 8,810 | |
| April 11 | Lee Hi | "Rose" | 8,802 | |
| April 18 | Psy | "Gentleman" | —N/a | |
| April 25 | Psy | "Gentleman" | 8,356 | |
| May 2 | Psy | "Gentleman" | 8,157 | |
| May 9 | 4Minute | "What's Your Name?" | 7,923 | |
| May 16 | 4Minute | "What's Your Name?" | 8,380 | |
| May 23 | Shinhwa | "This Love" | 8,283 | |
| May 30 | Shinhwa | "This Love" | 8,642 | |
| June 6 | Shinhwa | "This Love" | —N/a | |
| June 13 | Lee Hyori | "Bad Girls" | 6,751 | |
| June 20 | Sistar | "Give It to Me" | 7,995 | |
| June 27 | Sistar | "Give It to Me" | 8,430 | |
| July 4 | Sistar | "Give It to Me" | 8,417 | |
| July 11 | Dynamic Duo | "BAAAM" | 7,193 | |
| July 18 | 2NE1 | "Falling in Love" | —N/a | |
| July 25 | Infinite | "Destiny" | 7,532 | |
| August 1 | Beast | "Shadow" | 8,373 | |
| August 8 | f(x) | "Rum Pum Pum Pum" | 9,079 | |
| August 15 | 2NE1 | "Do You Love Me" | 8,017 | |
| August 22 | Exo | "Growl" | 8,154 | |
| August 29 | Exo | "Growl" | —N/a | |
| September 5 | Exo | "Growl" | 6,817 | |
| September 12 | G-Dragon featuring Jennie | "Black" | 6,604 | |
| September 19 | G-Dragon featuring Jennie | "Black" | —N/a | |
| September 26 | G-Dragon | "Crooked" | 7,369 | |
| October 3 | Busker Busker | "Love, at first" | 9,419 | |
| October 10 | Busker Busker | "Love, at first" | 9,415 | |
| October 17 | IU | "The Red Shoes" | 9,052 | |
| October 24 | IU | "The Red Shoes" | —N/a | |
| October 31 | Shinee | "Everybody" | 6,914 | |
| November 7 | Trouble Maker | "Now" | 7,783 | |
| November 14 | Trouble Maker | "Now" | 8,001 | |
| November 21 | Miss A | "Hush" | —N/a | |
| November 28 | 2NE1 | "Missing You" | —N/a | |
| December 5 | 2NE1 | "Missing You" | 7,982 | |
| December 12 | Hyolyn | "One Way Love" | 8,044 | |
| December 19 | Exo | "Miracles in December" | 8,878 | |
| December 26 | Exo | "Miracles in December" | —N/a | |
