= Shine a Light (G-Dragon album) =

- Taiwan edition cover

Live album by G-Dragon
- Released: March 30, 2010
- Recorded: December 2009
- Venue: Olympic Gymnastics Arena (Seoul)
- Genre: Hip hop; dance-pop; R&B
- Language: Korean
- Label: YG
- Producer: Yang Hyun-suk (exec.); G-Dragon

G-Dragon chronology
Heartbreaker (2009)	Shine a Light (2010)	GD&TOP (2010)

Shine a Light is the first live album by South Korean rapper G-Dragon. It was released on March 30, 2010 and is a two-disc compilation of live and remixed songs, recorded during his Shine a Light concert in December 2009 at Olympic Gymnastics Arena.

== Background ==
Following G-Dragon's plagiarism accusations for his song "Heartbreaker" by Sony Music who saw similarities to Flo Rida's song "Right Round", YG Entertainment announced they had personally reached out to Flo Rida's representatives. The label confirmed on March 6, 2010 that Flo Rida is going to appear as a featuring artist in a new version of "Heartbreaker", to be included as a bonus track on G-Dragon's live album Shine a Light.

== Track listing ==
All tracks written by G-Dragon; "The Leaders" co-written with Teddy and CL.

=== Disc 1 ===
Shine a Light – Disc one
No.	Title	Length
1.	"Heartbreaker"	5:04
2.	"This Love"	3:44
3.	"Hello" (feat. Dara)	3:46
4.	"Gossip Man" (feat. Kim Gunmo)	3:58
5.	"My Age Is 13 + Storm + Hip Hop Gentlemen + G-Dragon"	4:15
6.	"A Boy"	3:16
7.	"The Leaders" (feat. Teddy, CL)	4:44
8.	"Breathe"	3:54
9.	"Butterfly"	3:41
10.	"But I Love U"	4:55
11.	"She's Gone" (feat. Kush)	4:50
12.	"Only Look At Me Pt. 2" (feat. Taeyang)	4:01
13.	"Korean Dream" (feat. Taeyang)	3:33
14.	"Station of One Year"	5:29
15.	"Lies"	5:59
16.	"Heartbreaker (Encore)"	4:51

=== Disc 2 ===
Shine a Light – Disc two (bonus tracks)
No.	Title	Length
1.	"Heartbreaker (feat. Flo Rida)"	3:24
2.	"This Love (G.H remix)"	3:19
3.	"A Boy (Choice37 Remix)"	3:24
4.	"Breathe (Hitchhiker Remix)"	3:38
5.	"Heartbreaker (Choice37 Remix)"	3:37

== Charts and sales ==
=== Charts ===
Chart (2010)	Peak position
South Korea Gaon Weekly Album Chart	1
Chart (2013)	Peak position
Taiwan G-Music Combo Chart	5

=== Sales ===
Chart	Sales
South Korea Gaon chart	50,449

== Release history ==
Region	Date	Format	Distributing Label	Ref
South Korea	March 30, 2010	CD; digital download	YG Entertainment	
Taiwan	May 7, 2013	CD	Warner Music Taiwan	
