= Coup d'Etat (song) =

2013 song by G-Dragon

Song by G-Dragon featuring Diplo and Baauer

from the album Coup d'Etat
- Released: September 2, 2013
- Genre: Trap
- Length: 2:58
- Label: YG Entertainment
- Songwriter: G-Dragon
- Producers: G-Dragon; Diplo; Baauer

"Coup d'Etat" is a song recorded by South Korean rapper G-Dragon featuring American DJs Diplo and Baauer, who also served as co-producers. It was released through YG Entertainment on September 2, 2013, as a track on G-Dragon's second studio album of the same name.

== Background ==
In June 2013, YG Entertainment announced that Missy Elliott and Diplo would be collaborating on the album, with Missy Elliott appearing on "Niliria" while Diplo appeared in "Coup d'Etat." Jessica Oak from Billboard magazine describes the album's title track, co-produced by American DJs Diplo and Baauer, as a slow tempo trap influenced song, which samples Gil Scott-Heron's "The Revolution Will Not Be Televised." YG Entertainment released the music video for "Coup d'Etat" on YouTube on September 1, 2013, which garnered over 750,000 views after a day. Seoul Beats praised the direction of the music video, describing it as "a vivid three minute, twenty-two second journey to the shadowy side of G-Dragon's visual imagination."

== Chart performance and sales ==
=== Weekly charts ===
Chart (2013)	Peak position
South Korea (Gaon Digital Chart)	5
South Korea (K-pop Hot 100)	15
US World Digital Songs (Billboard)	4

=== Sales ===
Country	Sales
South Korea (digital)	452,833

== Awards and nominations ==
Awards for "Coup d'Etat"
Year	Organization	Award	Result	Ref.
2013	Mnet Asian Music Awards	Best Music Video	Won	

Music program wins
Program	Date
Inkigayo (SBS)	September 15, 2013
