= EDM trap music =

Genre of music

- Other names: EDM trap; acid trap; trapstep
- Stylistic origins: EDM; trap; house; pop rap; hip-hop; dubstep; reggae; Electro house; hardstyle; moombahton; dancehall; electro pop
- Cultural origins: Early 2010s, United States
- Typical instruments: Music sequencer; sampler; synthesizer; keyboard instrument; digital audio workstation
- Derivative forms: Future bass

Subgenres
- Twerk; Chill trap; Hybrid trap; Festival trap; Heaven trap; Hardwave; Hard trap

Other topics
- Footwork; rage music

An example of EDM with trap-inspired elements ("Arabian Riches" by Audial)

EDM trap music, Trap EDM, or simply Trap, is a fusion genre of hip-hop, rave, and electronic dance music (EDM), that originated in the early 2010s on peaking popularity of big room house and hip hop trap genres. It blends elements of hip hop trap, which is an offshoot of Southern hip-hop, with elements of EDM like build-ups, drops, dense production with rave music synthesizers, and breakdowns. As it was popularized, it increasingly began incorporating more pop elements. EDM trap songs and production are typically very dynamic, boisterous, experimental, and sparky in comparison to the hip-hop version of trap, due to its EDM and rave music elements, tendencies and structure.

== History ==
Around 2012, a new style of electronic dance music (EDM) emerged which incorporated elements of trap music, creating "dirty, aggressive beats [and] dark melodies." Electronic music producers, such as TNGHT, Baauer, RL Grime, Flosstradamus and Yellow Claw (DJs) expanded the popularity, and brought wider attention to the derivative forms of trap. This genre saw the use of techno, dub, and electro sounds combined with the Roland TR-808 drum samples and vocal samples typical of hip hop trap.

In the later half of 2012, these various offshoots of hip hop trap became increasingly popular and made a noticeable impact on the American electronic dance music scene. The music was initially dubbed simply as "trap" by producers and fans, which led to the term "trap" being used to address the music of both rappers and electronic producers, to much confusion among followers of both. The term "trap" continued to be used to describe two separate genres of hip hop and dance music. The new wave of the genre has been labeled by some as "EDM trap" to distinguish it from the hip hop genre. The terms "trap-techno" and "trapstep" are often labeled by producers to describe the musical structure of an individual track. The evolving EDM trap has seen incorporation and stylistic influences from dubstep, in which trap has been hailed as the superseding phase of dubstep during the mid-2010s. The new phase typically plays at 140 BPM with strong bass drops, which began growing in popularity from 2013.

In 2013, a fan-made video by Filthy Frank (also known as Joji), of EDM trap producer Baauer's track "Harlem Shake", became an internet meme, propelling the track to become the first EDM trap song to hit number one on the Billboard Hot 100. This challenge the track was used for consisted of one person dancing to the rhythm of the song until the beat dropped, in which then whoever else within the video would dance along with the person dancing in the beginning. Five EDM trap producers performed at the 2013 Ultra Music Festival in the United States, including DJ Craze, Baauer and Flosstradamus. The 2013 Tomorrowland festival featured a "trap stage".

On February 10, 2013, All Trap Music released their debut compilation album which featured 19 tracks from artists including RL Grime, Flosstradamus, Baauer, Bro Safari and 12th Planet. Described by the music press as the first album of its kind it reached number two in the iTunes dance chart with Vibe stating it was "the world's biggest-selling EDM trap album ever." In 2013, DJ Snake and Lil Jon released the single "Turn Down for What", which became both a commercial hit charting in several countries and a critical hit. Rolling Stone voted "Turn Down for What" as the second best song of 2014, saying that, "The year's nutsiest party jam was also the perfect protest banger for a generation fed up with everything. DJ Snake brings the synapse-rattling EDM and Southern trap music; Lil Jon brings the dragon-fire holler for a hilarious, glorious, glowstick-punk fuck you."

EDM trap music has also found fame internationally, especially in South Korea. South Korean boy band BigBang was one of the earliest groups to bring EDM trap into the K-pop sphere with commercial hit singles such as "Good Boy" (2014) by its members GD X Taeyang and "Bang Bang Bang" (2015). In 2018, South Korean girl group Blackpink released the commercially and critically successful single "Ddu-Du Ddu-Du", which propelled the EDM trap sound to "global heights". Rolling Stone recognized "Ddu-Du Ddu-Du" for having perfected and popularized K-pop's EDM trap template, and named it the sixth best Korean song of all time.

EDM trap began to fuse with synth-pop and emo pop in the late 2010s when Philadelphia producer group Working on Dying began to produce Eternal Atake, the third studio album by Francisville rapper Lil Uzi Vert. Brandon Finessin of Working on Dying earned eight producer credits on Lil Uzi Vert's emo rap album, adding hyperpop and EDM elements to traditional trap drum sequences. This led to Lil Uzi Vert and Brandon Finessin leading the Billboard charts collaboratively on the Producers and Songwriters Top 100s. This caused an offshoot scene of hyperpop trap beats to emerge from minor YouTube producers based on Working on Dying's electronic approach to trap music.

A new subgenre of EDM trap music referred to as trapwave (or hardwave) emerged also in late 2010s that fuses trap music with synthwave.
