= OO (EP) =

EP by Zion.T
- Released: February 1, 2017
- Recorded: 2016
- Genre: R&B; Soul
- Length: 26:58
- Language: Korean
- Label: The Black Label; YG
- Producer: Zion.T; Peejay

Zion.T chronology
Mirrorball (2013)	OO (2017)	ZZZ (2018)

Singles from OO
- 1. "The Song" Released: February 1

OO is the second extended play by South Korean singer Zion.T. It was released by YG Entertainment subsidiary label The Black Label on February 1, 2017. The extended play features his collaboration with G-Dragon and Beenzino.

== Background and release ==
On January 21, 2017, it was announced that Zion.T would release new music in early February, and that he had completed filming the music video for his new album's title single, which was directed by Han Sa-min. Two days later, they announced that the album was to release on February 1, and that G-Dragon would be featured in the album; it was the second collaboration between them, since 2013 when Zion.T featured on G-Dragon's I Love It. Beenzino was later revealed to be featured in the album, with teasers of all the songs of the album. On January 27, a teaser video of the album was released, alongside the title track.

== Reception ==
Billboard's Tamar Herman praised the album and the title single, "While maintaining his typical croons, Zion.T refreshed his sound on "Your Song" with the lively piano-based melody...the singer's latest is a refreshing, poppish update to his sonic style. With snapping, playful strings and a rock-tinged chorus, "Your Song" is a tightly produced track that complements Zion.T's lush vocals." The song "Complex" featuring G-Dragon was selected by Apple Music 'Best of the Week'.

== Track listing ==
No.	Title	Lyrics	Music	Arrangement	Length
1.	"Cinema" (영화관; yeonghwagwan)	Zion.T	Zion.T, Peejay	Peejay	3:33
2.	"The Song" (노래; nolae)	Zion.T	Zion.T, Kush	Kush, Peejay	3:36
3.	"Comedian"	Zion.T	Zion.T, SC Yun	Peejay	1:53
4.	"Sorry" (featuring Beenzino; 미안해; mianhae)	Zion.T, Beenzino	Peejay, Zion.T, Seo Won-jin	Peejay	3:06
5.	"The Bad Guys" (나쁜 놈들; nappeun nomdeul)	Zion.T	Zion.T, Peejay	Peejay	3:34
6.	"Complex" (featuring G-Dragon)	Zion.T, G-Dragon, DJ Dopsh	Zion.T, Peejay, Slom	Peejay, Slom	3:27
7.	"Wishes (2015)" (바람 (2015); balam (2015))	Zion.T	Zion.T, Kush, Seo Won-jin	Seo Won-jin	4:13
8.	"Cinema" (Instrumental)		Zion.T, Peejay	Peejay	3:32
Total length:					26:58

== Weekly charts ==
Chart (2017)	Peak chart positions
South Korean Weekly Albums (Gaon)	8
South Korean Monthly Albums (Gaon)	26
US Billboard Heatseekers Albums	24
US Billboard World Albums	2

== Sales ==
Chart	Sales
Gaon physical sales	3,934

== Release history ==
Region	Date	Format	Label
Worldwide	February 1, 2017	Digital download	YG Entertainment
South Korea	February 13, 2017	CD	YG Entertainment, KT Music
