= Coup d'Etat (G-Dragon album) =

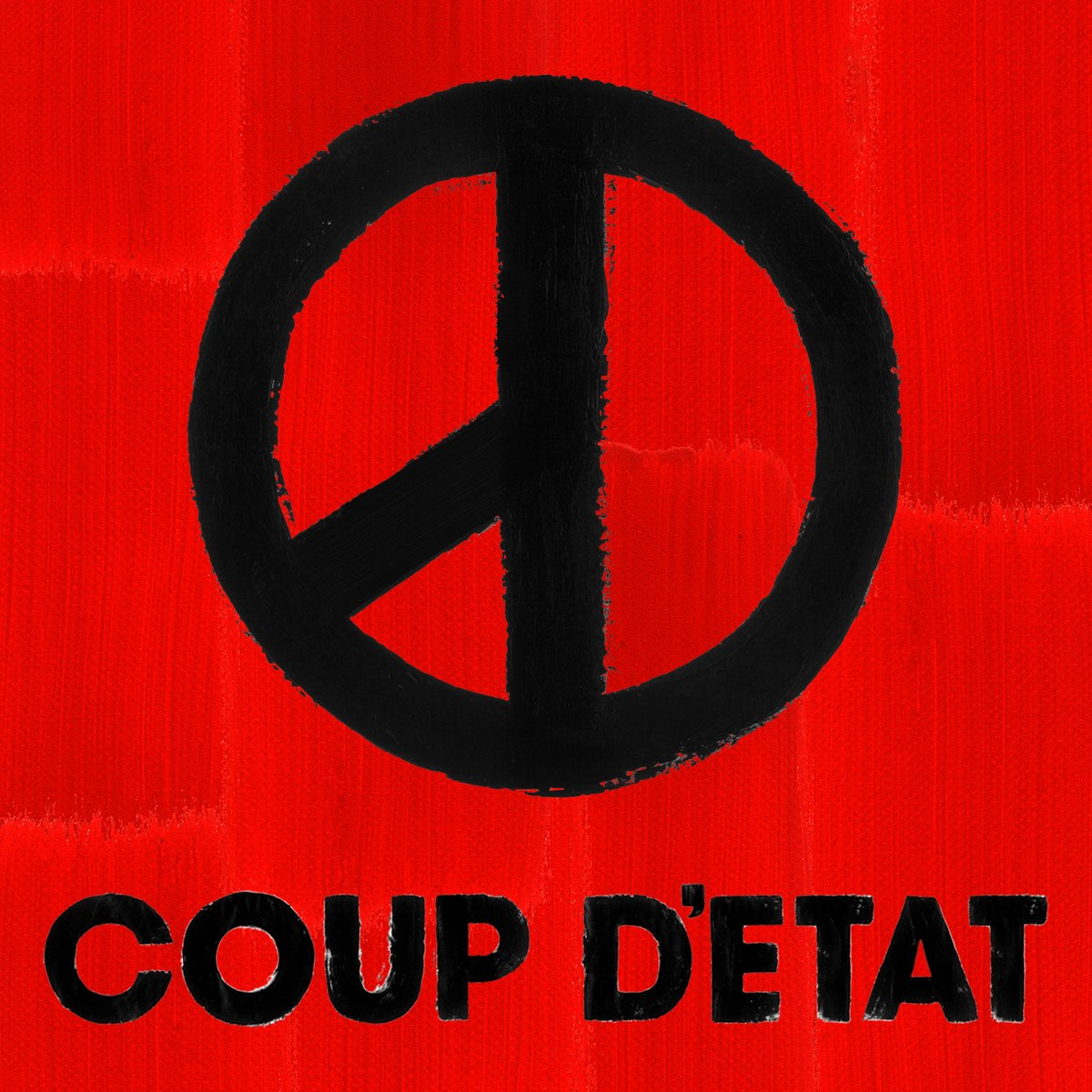

Studio album by G-Dragon
- Released: September 5, 2013
- Recorded: 2011–2013
- Genre: K-hip hop; trap; R&B; brostep
- Length: 45:58
- Language: Korean; English
- Label: YG
- Producer: G-Dragon; Teddy; Choice37; Kush; Diplo; Boys Noize; Siriusmo; Dee.P; Baauer; Ham Seung-cheon; Kang Wook-jin; Missy Elliot

G-Dragon chronology
One of a Kind (2012)	Coup d'Etat (2013)	Coup d'Etat + One of a Kind & Heartbreaker (2013)

Singles from Coup d'Etat
- 1. "Black" Released: September 2, 2013; 2. "Who You?" Released: September 2, 2013; 3. "Crooked" Released: September 5, 2013; 4. "Niliria" Released: September 5, 2013

Coup d'Etat is the second studio album by South Korean rapper G-Dragon, member and leader of South Korean boy band Big Bang. The album was initially released on iTunes. The first five tracks of the album were released on September 2, 2013, the next seven tracks were released on September 5, and physical copies were released on September 13.

The album was supported by the singles "Black" and "Who You?" released on September 2, and "Crooked" and "Niliria" on September 5. It also contains the promotional single "MichiGO", which was released on April 1, 2013. The album charted at number one on the South Korean Gaon Album Chart and entered the Billboard 200, making G-Dragon the first K-pop act with multiple entries in that chart. Coup d'Etat received primarily favorable reviews by critics.

== Development ==
In an interview with Complex, G-Dragon explained that he did not feel connected with his first solo album anymore. Commenting on the evolution of his sound, he stated:

"Now, I've been in the game for some time, and I understand how to have a better balance of things. I've come to realize ways of making music without being excessive. I'm more at ease when I'm rapping. Whether it's music or fashion, the older I get, I realize what's comfortable lasts longer. And a lot of that is reflected in the new album."

G-Dragon mostly worked with YG's in house producers, Choice37, Teddy Park and Kush. In LOEN Entertainment's "Ask in A Box" interview, G-Dragon revealed that he took almost two years recording Coup d'Etat. He first recorded demos for "Niliria" and "Runaway" in 2011. When discussing why the album took years to be completed, the rapper said:

"There are various reasons why the second album took so long. Mostly, I just wanted to make things better and better. I have a lot of records that I sketched out, but they're not really organized properly. So instead of putting out incomplete records, I wanted to trim things down and make it super tight. That's why we put out the One of a Kind (2012) mini-album out first. With the remaining time, I redid the records, molded them, and now they're complete. Whenever I consider putting something out, I just feel like more needs to be done. I wouldn't say that I'm not confident, but it's more so a sense of feeling like I could make it better. That's why it took so long."

== Composition ==
Coup d'Etat is an eclectic mix of hip-hop, dubstep, rock, electro, and pop. The record features collaborations from various artists such as Diplo, Baauer, Missy Elliott, Boys Noize, Sky Ferreira, Zion.T, Lydia Paek, and label-mate Jennie Kim, who later became a member of Blackpink three years after the album's release. The album's title track, co-produced by American DJs Diplo and Baauer, is a slow tempo trap influenced song. The collaboration with Missy Elliott, "Niliria", was distinctive for its ethnic and surrealist beat. The duet with Lydia Paek, "R.O.D", is a dubstep track featuring Caribbean timbales while "Black" was compared to the early '90s R&B ballads. The single "Crooked" was described as a "catchy pop-punk" track that fuses "heavy drumbeats and metal guitar riffs." "Runaway" is a combination of alternative rock and electronic music and "I Love It", which was co-produced by German DJ Boys Noize, is a "smooth R&B-disco mash-up". Lastly, "Window" is a hiphop and pop track with melancholic 80s synths "blended with tribal beats".

== Release ==
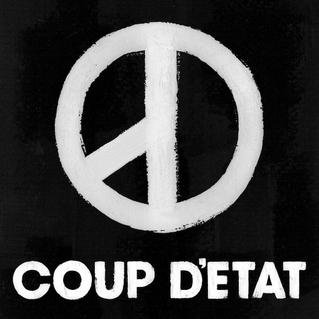
Part 1 cover

The album was first released digitally divided in two parts: Coup d'État: Part I was released on September 2, 2013, with the first five tracks of the tracklist, while the seven additional tracks were released on September 5. The physical edition, including two exclusive tracks, was released on September 14.

On September 29, 2013, YG Entertainment announced that limited edition vinyl copies of Coup d'Etat would be released on October 18. The package was said to include a badge, a mask and a booklet with hand-written lyrics. Photos from the "Space Eight" art exhibition held in Seoul as well as photos from the "Coup d'Etat" music video would also be included. Only 8,888 units were sold. Pre-orders for the vinyl edition was made available on September 30, it sold out on October 2 after getting pre-orders for all copies.

== Promotion ==
On March 15, 2013 YG Entertainment announced that G-Dragon would release a new promotional single to support his first world tour. "MichiGo" was released exclusively through mobile app Line on April 1, available only on South Korea, Japan and Thailand. "Black" featuring then-YG trainee Jennie and "Who You?" were released as the first two singles on September 2, followed by the third and fourth singles "Crooked" and "Niliria" (G-Dragon version) on September 5.

YG Entertainment announced in June that Missy Elliott and Diplo would be collaborating on the album. A series of teaser photos were then released by YG Entertainment on August 26 and on August 27, 2013. YG then released the full album track list on September 1 which revealed other collaborating artists such as Lydia Paek, Jennie, Boys Noize, Baauer, and Sky Ferreira.

G-Dragon and Missy Elliott debuted the song "Niliria" with a live performance on KCON 2013 on August 25, 2013, in Los Angeles. YG Entertainment released the music video for "Coup d'Etat" on YouTube on September 1, 2013, which garnered over 750,000 views after a day. The music video for "Crooked" was then released on September 4, 2013. The first televised performance was held at the talk show You Hee-yeol's Sketchbook on September 6, where G-Dragon performed the single "Crooked" and the solo version of "Niliria". The first performance at a music show, which featured the tracks "Niliria", "Michi Go" and the debut of the song "Black" with Jennie took place on SBS's Inkigayo on September 8, 2013. On November 13, the fourth music video of the album, "Who You?" was released on YouTube.

G-Dragon held an art exhibition in Seoul on September 10 to 17, 2013 which coincided with the release of the album. The exhibition was entitled "Space Eight". The art exhibition showcased 88 items which relates to the number 8. On September 29, he and CL joined for the first live performance of "R.O.D", on the show Inkigayo. YG was speculated to re-release the single as a sleeper single. The song "R.O.D." was rumored to be the final single of the album by various sources.

== Commercial performance ==
Tracks from Coup d'Etat topped major Korean music sites such as MelOn, Mnet, Bugs, Naver, and Olleh. A total of seven tracks were placed from one to seven on the Mnet charts upon release, while six tracks from Coup d'Etat were also placed within the top 10 of the Gaon Singles Charts with "Who You?" being number one. Up to August 2016, the album has sold over 6.2 million copies of digital downloads. Coup d'Etat was the third best-selling digital album on Melon of 2013. The album also topped the iTunes charts in several countries.

On September 10, it was revealed the physical album had received pre-orders in excess of 300,000 copies in South Korea. The album eventually debuted at number one in the Gaon Albums Chart and went on to be number one on the same chart for the month of September after selling 198,489 copies. Coup d'Etat, Pt. 1 debuted at number 182 in the US Billboard 200 charts with first week sales of more than 2,000 copies. Pt. 1 also topped Billboard World Album Chart, while Pt. 2 held the second spot. On the Heatseekers Albums chart, the first and second parts debuted at number three and five, respectively. Coup d'Etat made G-Dragon, along with boy band Shinee, be the first Korean act to enter Billboard's Year-end World Albums Artists.

Coup d'Etat debuted at number eleven in the Oricon Albums Chart in Japan with an estimated total of 11,150 copies sold during its first week of release. The Japanese version of the album named Coup d'Etat + One of a Kind & Heartbreaker debuted at number two on the same chart.

== Critical reception ==
Professional ratings
Review scores
Source	Rating
MTV Iggy	favorable
The New York Times	favorable
Pitchfork	6.1/10

In a review for MTV, Alexis Stephens wrote that G-Dragon "created a post-modern pastiche of worldwide pop idol sounds" that at times "feels like empty calories". Jeff Benjamin and Jessica Oak of Billboard felt that the album "establishes that K-pop stars are no different than pop stars of the West and, really, no different than everyday people struggling with insecurities, relationships and proving one's maturity perhaps just a bit prematurely." David Jeffries of AllMusic noted that G-Dragon "set his sights on America" with this album, and declared that, "when this flashy and slick effort goes deep", the listener will be shocked.

Jon Caramanica of The New York Times expressed that "K-pop is gloriously synthetic, and G-Dragon is a miraculous canvas to work with. He morphs easily into almost any style, he moves with panache and confidence, and he has a perpetual sense of theater about him." The critic also noted that Coup d'Etat "is perhaps the K-pop album with America most heavily on its mind and in its credits."

Corban Goble of Pitchfork felt that the album's best moments came from the delivery of "G-Dragon's superstar promise" and in the capitalization of "his enormous charisma." He concluded in his review that, "if you come to Coup d'Etat expecting some kind of revolution you'll be disappointed; it's an intriguing listen, if not an important one." Complex ranked the album's red cover at number 20 on their "The 50 Best Pop Album Covers of the Past Five Years" list, with Dale Eisinger commenting that:

"In a truly globalized environment, where pop singers trade across borders with ease, a singer like G-Dragon is less of an anomaly and more of a visionary, even if the semaphore buried in the original symbol might not hold up in this new iteration. But what does work is that East/West divide that emptying out the right side of this icon offers – the roundness, the oneness of the circle, is emphasized over the original symbol, giving a new global weight to the international smash-hit album's visuals."

== Accolades ==
Music program awards
Song	Program	Date
"Black"	M Countdown	September 12, 2013
"Black"	M Countdown	September 19, 2013
"Coup d'Etat"	Inkigayo	September 15, 2013
"Who You?"	Music Bank	September 20, 2013
"Crooked"	Inkigayo	September 22, 2013
"Crooked"	Inkigayo	September 29, 2013
"Crooked"	M Countdown	September 26, 2013
"Crooked"	Music Bank	September 27, 2013

== Track listing ==
No.	Title	Lyrics	Music	Arrangement	Length
1.	"Coup d'Etat" (쿠데타; Kudeta; featuring Diplo and Baauer)	G-Dragon	G-Dragon; Diplo; Baauer	Diplo; Baauer	2:58
2.	"Niliria" (늴리리야; Nililiya; featuring Missy Elliott)	Missy Elliott; G-Dragon	Teddy; G-Dragon; Missy Elliott	Teddy	2:52
3.	"R.O.D." (featuring Lydia Paek)	Teddy; G-Dragon; Choice37	Teddy	Teddy	3:56
4.	"Black" (featuring Jennie of Blackpink)	Teddy; G-Dragon	Teddy	Teddy	3:23
5.	"Who You?" (니가 뭔데; Niga Mwonde)	G-Dragon	G-Dragon; Kush	Kush; Choice37	3:21
6.	"Shake the World" (세상을 흔들어; Sesangeul Heundeuleo)	G-Dragon	G-Dragon; Choice37	Choice37	2:55
7.	"GO" (미치Go; Michigo; lit. Crazy GO)	G-Dragon	G-Dragon; Ham Seung-cheon; Kang Wook-jin	Ham Seung-cheon; Kang Wook-jin	3:28
8.	"Crooked" (삐딱하게; Ppiddak-hage)	Teddy; G-Dragon	Teddy; G-Dragon	Teddy	3:45
9.	"Niliria" (늴리리야; Nililiya; G-Dragon ver.)	G-Dragon; Teddy	Teddy; Missy Elliott; G-Dragon	Teddy	2:52
10.	"Runaway"	G-Dragon	G-Dragon; Dee.P	Dee.P	3:21
11.	"I Love It" (너무 좋아; Neomu Joh-a; featuring Zion.T and Boys Noize)	G-Dragon	G-Dragon; Boys Noize; Siriusmo	Boys Noize; Siriusmo	3:15
12.	"You Do" (outro)	G-Dragon	G-Dragon; Choice37	Choice37	2:38
13.	"Window"	G-Dragon; Teddy	Choice37; Teddy; G-Dragon	Choice37	3:47
14.	"Black" (featuring Sky Ferreira)	Teddy; G-Dragon	Teddy	Teddy	3:24
Total length:					46:19

Notes

- Tracks 4, 5, 8 and 9 are promotional tracks.
- Part 1 included tracks 1 to 5, whilst Part 2 included tracks 6 to 12.
- Tracks 13 and 14 are exclusive to the physical edition.
- Track 4 credits Jennie under the name "Jennie Kim of YG New Girl Group".

Sample credits

- "Coup d'Etat" contains a vocal sample of "The Revolution Will Not Be Televised" written and performed by Gil Scott-Heron.
- "Niliria" contains elements of a traditional Korean folk song of the same name.

== Charts ==
=== Weekly charts ===
Chart (2013)	Peak positions
French Download Albums (SNEP)	138
Japanese Albums (Oricon)	2
South Korean Albums (Gaon)	1
US Billboard 200	182
US Heatseekers Albums (Billboard)	3
US Independent Albums (Billboard)	39
US Top Rap Albums (Billboard)	19
US World Albums (Billboard)	1

=== Yearly charts ===
Chart (2013)	Position
South Korean Albums (Gaon)	9

== Sales ==
Region	Sales amount
South Korea	204,758
United States	4,000

== Release history ==
Region	Date	Label	Format	Ref.
Various	September 2, 2013 (part 1)	YG Entertainment	Digital download; streaming	
Various	September 5, 2013 (part 2)	YG Entertainment	Digital download; streaming	
South Korea	September 13, 2013	YG Entertainment; KT Music	CD	
Taiwan	October 4, 2013	Warner Music Taiwan	CD	
South Korea	October 18, 2013	YG Entertainment	Vinyl (limited edition)	
