= GD X Taeyang =

South Korean K-pop/hip hop duo

- Also known as: GDYB
- Origin: Seoul, South Korea
- Genres: K-pop; hip hop
- Years active: 2014–2015
- Label: YG Entertainment
- Spinoff of: Big Bang
- Members: G-Dragon; Taeyang

GD X Taeyang (also known as GDYB) are a South Korean duo from YG Entertainment, consisting of G-Dragon and Taeyang from Big Bang. After several years of appearing on each other's solo materials, the duo officially released the single "Good Boy" in 2014, which went on to top Billboard's World Digital Songs chart and sold over a million digital units in South Korea.

== History ==
Kwon Ji-yong and Dong Young-bae first met as trainees at YG Entertainment. After signing a contract with the record label, they spent the first year cleaning the studio and fetching water bottles during dance practices for YG artists. Dong later admitted that current artists at the time weren't friendly towards him or Kwon. The original plan for the two was to debut as the hip-hop duo GDYB, with Kwon choosing the stage name G-Dragon ("Ji" is pronounced like "G" and Yong is Korean for "dragon"). Though they made several appearances both as a duo and as individuals on other artists' music, the plan for their debut was scrapped and they were joined by four other trainees (T.O.P, Daesung, Seungri and Jang Hyun-seung) to form BigBang instead. The formation of the group was documented on television, but prior to their official debut, Jang was dropped. Dong later adopted the stage name Taeyang. Member Seungri later admitted that G-Dragon was initially cold towards Daesung and himself because G-Dragon had wanted to be in the hip hop duo and disliked being placed in a band. Taeyang himself was also initially hesitant about being placed in a band but eventually warmed up to the other members.

Despite activities with their band, the duo continued to collaborate with one another outside of BigBang's materials, with G-Dragon participating as a writer and producer for Taeyang's first extended play Hot (2008), (Note: According to the credits on the album's jacket.) after which G-Dragon subsequently recorded a "Part Two" to the EP's lead single "Only Look at Me" (Korean: 나만 바라봐; RR: Naman barabwa). Later, G-Dragon had a rap verse on Taeyang's single "I Need a Girl". Taeyang returned the favor by appearing in the song "Korean Dream" for G-Dragon's first album Heartbreaker (2009). G-Dragon later wrote and produced several songs for Taeyang's first and second albums Solar (2010) and Rise (2014).

An official collaboration between the two as the subunit GD x Taeyang emerged in 2014 with the song "Good Boy," which reached number one on Billboard's World Digital Songs, making it the third time a Korean act had topped the chart after PSY and 2NE1. The single accrued 1.2 million downloads in South Korea, and its music video accumulated over 100 million views on the video-sharing website YouTube. In 2015, the duo participated in the Infinite Challenge music festival, teaming up with ZE:A's Hwang Kwanghee for the single "Mapsosa", which peaked at number two on the Gaon Digital Chart and sold 1.3 million copies by the end of the year, making it one of the best-selling songs of 2015.

== Discography ==
=== Single albums ===
Title	Album details	Peak chart positions	Sales
Title	Album details	KOR	Sales
Good Boy	Released: November 21, 2014; Label: YG Entertainment; Format: CD, digital download	1	KOR: 25,000
"—" denotes releases that did not chart or were not released in that region.

=== DVDs ===
Title	Album details	Peak chart positions	Sales
Title	Album details	JPN	Sales
G-Dragon X Taeyang in Paris 2014	Released: June 18, 2014; Languages: Korean; Labels: YG Entertainment	8	JPN: 6,033

=== Singles ===
Title	Year	Peak positions			Sales	Album
Title	Year	KOR	FIN Dig.	US World	Sales	Album
"Good Boy"	2014	5	21	1	KOR: 1,260,683; US: 5,000	Good Boy / YG Hip Hop Project
"Mapsosa" (맙소사) (with Kwanghee)	2015	2	—	10	KOR: 1,302,380	Infinite Challenge
"—" denotes releases that did not chart or were not released in that region.

=== Other collaborations ===
Title	Year	Peak positions		Sales	Album
Title	Year	KOR	US World	Sales	Album
"Unfold at a Higher Place" (As GDYB)	2002	—	—	—N/a	Why Be Normal?
"Heosubai" (Masta Wu featuring GDYB)	2003	—	—	—N/a	Masta Peace
"Run" (Se7en featuring GDYB)	2006	—	—	—N/a	24/SE7EN
"Super Fly" (Lexy featuring G-Dragon, T.O.P and Taeyang)	2007	—	—	—N/a	Rush
"Korean Dream" (G-Dragon feat. Taeyang)	2009	3	—	—N/a	Heartbreaker
"Hallelujah" (T.O.P featuring G-Dragon and Taeyang) (Iris soundtrack)	2009	—	—	—N/a	Non-album single
"I Need A Girl" (Taeyang featuring G-Dragon)	2010	4	—	KOR: 1,876,167	Solar
"Let's Talk About Love" (Seungri feat. G-Dragon and Taeyang)	2013	15	9	KOR: 266,006	Let's Talk About Love
"Stay With Me" (Taeyang featuring G-Dragon)	2014	7	4	KOR: 343,555	Rise

== Awards and nominations ==
Awards received by GD X Taeyang
Name	Year	Award category	Nominated works	Result	Ref.
Melon Music Awards	2015	Hot Trend Award	"Mapsosa"	Won	
YouTube Music Awards	2015	Honored Artist	"Good Boy"	Won	

Melon Popularity Award
Song	Award	Date	Ref.
"Mapsosa"	Weekly Popularity Award	September 7, 2015	
"Mapsosa"	Weekly Popularity Award	September 14, 2015	
"Mapsosa"	Weekly Popularity Award	September 21, 2015	
