= Black (G-Dragon song) =

Single by G-Dragon featuring Jennie

from the album Coup d'Etat
- Released: September 2, 2013
- Recorded: 2011–2013
- Genre: R&B
- Length: 3:23
- Label: YG
- Songwriters: Teddy; G-Dragon
- Producer: Teddy

G-Dragon singles chronology
"Crayon" (2012)	"Black" / "Who You?" (2013)	"Crooked" / "Niliria" (2013)

Jennie singles chronology
"Black" (2013)	"Solo" (2018)

Audio video
- "Black" (feat. Jennie) on YouTube "Black" (feat. Sky Ferreira) on YouTube

"Black" is a song by South Korean rapper G-Dragon featuring South Korean singer and rapper Jennie. It was released on September 2, 2013, by YG Entertainment alongside "Who You?" as the lead singles from G-Dragon's second studio album, Coup d'Etat (2013). A version featuring American singer-songwriter Sky Ferreira was also released as a track on the album. A Japanese version of the song featuring South Korean singer Park Bom of 2NE1 was released on the compilation album Coup d'Etat + One of a Kind & Heartbreaker (2013).

The version featuring Jennie peaked at number two on the Gaon Digital Chart and number three on the Billboard K-pop Hot 100 in South Korea, while the version featuring Sky Ferreira peaked at number ten on the Billboard World Digital Songs chart in the United States.

== Background and recording ==
"Black" was first written and produced by Teddy two years prior to its release. The original demo features him rapping on the first verse and Lydia Paek singing on the hook. Teddy initially wanted to keep the song for himself, as the song lyrics were personal. However, G-Dragon heard the track and immediately wanted to be on it, and wrote a second verse. According to Teddy, "I thought it was going to be hard for him to write the second verse and stay on topic, since the record's so vague and personal. But surprisingly he nailed it." Finding the artist for the hook was a process involving multiple artists, including Paek on the original version. American singer Sky Ferreira met with CL of 2NE1 in South Korea, who brought her to the studio where G-Dragon was working on his album. They presented Ferreira with the track and asked her to sing on it. She agreed and recorded a hook for the song in English. Once she heard the song, she described that "it sounded cool, but so different from anything I would do on my own. But it reminded me of stuff that I really like, that late '80s and early '90s R&B."

Yang Hyun-suk, the CEO of YG Entertainment, "pointed out that this song needs to be bigger, and said we should make a Korean version of the hook." He recommended that Jennie Kim, a trainee at the label, would be perfect for the song. Jennie would later make her debut in 2016 as a member of the girl group Blackpink. According to Teddy, she "heard Lydia's demo like 10 times, and we recorded her version of the hook in less than five days before the album dropped." The version of "Black" featuring Jennie was released on September 2, 2013, as a double title song with "Who You?" for G-Dragon's second studio album Coup d'Etat. The version of the song with Ferreira was included as the last track on the full album, which was released on September 13.

== Composition and lyrics ==
"Black" was noted for being a mellow, sparse early-1990s R&B song and a midtempo ballad. Lyrically, the song doubles as both a "bleak meditation on love" with emotional lines such as "Someday when it all goes black / I might want it all back / but I know I can't go back to you," as well as a "cutesy, flirtatious duet" between G-Dragon and the featured artist. According to G-Dragon, it is a love song about the darker feelings that arise when you are in love with someone. He described the emotions conveyed in the song as, "When you have a girlfriend, there are many things that are irritating every day, every night. I’m sure it’s different for everyone, but when you fight, it gets really annoying. You can’t do anything, so you end up just getting angry by yourself. Like punching the wall, or throwing your cell phone across the room. You know those types of feelings."

== Critical reception ==
"Black" received generally mixed reviews from music critics. In a review for The New York Times, Jon Caramanica praised G-Dragon's rapping on the song as "nimble and bouncy" and that "his emphases fall in all the right places." MTV's Alexis Stephens complimented the featured artists and stated that Jennie's verse was "impassioned and innocent," while Ferreira's delivery was "husky and sexy." On the other hand, Jeff Benjamin and Jessica Oak of Billboard expressed that the "low-brow" lyrics failed to be emotional as intended. Corban Goble of Pitchfork heavily criticized Sky Ferreira's appearance on the track, calling her delivery "listless" and that her hook "feels stitched on and focus-grouped."

== Commercial performance ==
In South Korea, the version of "Black" featuring Jennie debuted at number two on the Gaon Digital Chart issue dated September 1–7, 2013, with G-Dragon's "Who You?" occupying the number one position. "Black" sold 308,579 digital units and garnered 2,661,042 million streams in its first week, ranking at number two and number five on the component download and streaming charts, respectively. On the Billboard K-pop Hot 100, the version featuring Jennie debuted at number three, the second-highest debut from the album after "Who You?". For the month of September, "Black" ranked at number five on the monthly Gaon Digital Chart. On the year-end Gaon Download and Streaming charts of 2013, it ranked at number 70 and number 54 respectively, accumulating 871,025 digital units and 22,867,545 streams in 2013. On the year-end K-pop Hot 100 chart, the version featuring Jennie ranked as the 68th best-performing song of the year. By January 2015, it had accumulated a total of 1,009,720 digital sales in South Korea. In the United States, the version of "Black" featuring Sky Ferreira debuted at number 10 on the Billboard World Digital Songs chart.

== Live performances ==
G-Dragon and Jennie performed "Black" together on SBS's Inkigayo on September 8, 2013. As a trainee at the time, it marked Jennie's first live performance on a music show program. The two performed the song on Mnet's M Countdown on September 12, where they won the first-place trophy for the week. G-Dragon and Jennie performed "Black" again on Inkigayo on October 13.

== Accolades ==
Music program awards
Program	Date	Ref.
M Countdown	September 12, 2013	
M Countdown	September 19, 2013	

== Charts ==
=== Weekly charts ===
Weekly chart performance for "Black" featuring Jennie
Chart (2013)	Peak position
South Korea (Gaon)	2
South Korea (K-pop Hot 100)	3

Weekly chart performance for "Black" featuring Sky Ferreira
Chart (2013)	Peak position
US World Digital Song Sales (Billboard)	10

=== Monthly charts ===
Monthly chart performance for "Black" featuring Jennie
Chart (2013)	Peak position
South Korea (Gaon)	5

=== Year-end charts ===
Year-end chart performance for "Black" featuring Jennie
Chart (2013)	Position
South Korea Download (Gaon)	70
South Korea Streaming (Gaon)	54
South Korea (K-pop Hot 100)	68

== See also ==
- List of M Countdown Chart winners (2013)
- List of K-pop songs on the World Digital Song Sales chart
