= MichiGO =

Promotional single by G-Dragon

from the album Coup d'Etat
- Released: April 1, 2013
- Genre: K-hip hop, Electro-hop, dubstep
- Length: 3:28
- Label: YG Entertainment
- Songwriters: G-Dragon; Ham Seung-Cheon; Kang Wook-Jin
- Producers: G-Dragon; Ham Seung-Cheon; Kang Wook-Jin

Music video
- "미치GO" on YouTube

"MichiGO (미치Go)" is a promotional single recorded by South Korean hip hop artist G-Dragon from his second studio album, Coup d'Etat (2013). It was released digitally on April 1, 2013, through the application Line.

== Background ==
On March 15, YG Entertainment announced that G-Dragon will release a new single to support his first world tour. The single released exclusively through mobile app Line, it was first available only on South Korea, Japan and Thailand. The single was released worldwide on April 20 with the music video. The music video has a special appearances by Taeyang, Se7en, and Teddy.

== Commercial performance ==
The song entered Gaon Music Chart after releasing of the album Coup d'Etat, It charted on the first week at number 22 with total sales 87,930 digital copies, on the second week it raised at number 17 with 72,036 sales. By the end of September, the single sold 235,165 copies.

== Critical reception ==
Billboard said that the track showed G-Dragon's charismatic delivery, and that he has a signature style that will is recognizable. The Music Video was chosen the third on Buzz Feed's 24 Of The Most Brilliant Music Videos From 2013, "G-Dragon is known for making the most flamboyant and weird videos in K-Pop, and this delightfully weird video is his best yet.".

== Charts and sales ==
Chart (2013)	Peak position
Korea K-Pop Hot 100 (Billboard)	17
South Korea (Gaon Weekly Digital Chart)	17
South Korea (Gaon Weekly Download Chart)	17
South Korea (Gaon Weekly Streaming Chart)	39
South Korea (Gaon Weekly BGM Chart)	34
South Korea (Gaon Weekly Social Chart)	9
South Korea (Gaon Monthly Digital Chart)	37
US World Digital Songs (Billboard)	9

=== Sales ===
Chart	Sales
South Korea (Gaon Download Chart)	287,998

== Release history ==
Region	Date	Format	Label
South Korea, Japan and Thailand	April 1, 2013	Limited digital download	YG Entertainment
Worldwide	April 20, 2013	digital download	YG Entertainment
