= Good Boy (song) =

Single by GD X Taeyang
- Released: November 21, 2014
- Recorded: 2014
- Genre: K-hip hop; Electrohop; trap; gangsta rap
- Length: 4:05
- Label: YG
- Songwriter: G-Dragon
- Producers: G-Dragon; The Fliptones; Freedo

G-Dragon singles chronology
"Crooked" / "Niliria" (2013)	"Good Boy" (2014)	"Dirty Vibe" (2014)

Taeyang singles chronology
"1AM" (2014)	"Good Boy" (2014)	"Darling" (2017)

Music video
- "Good Boy" on YouTube

"Good Boy" is a song recorded by South Korean duo GD X Taeyang (G-Dragon and Taeyang), members of the boy band BigBang. It was released on November 21, 2014, as the second hip-hop project from YG Entertainment, the first being "Niliria" by G-Dragon featuring Missy Elliott a year prior. The single was written by G-Dragon, who also produced it along with the Fliptones and Freedo. "Good Boy" became a chart-topper on Billboard's World Digital Songs and a Top 5 hit on the Gaon Digital Chart. Additionally, a physical single was released and topped the Gaon Albums Chart.

== Release and promotion ==
YG Entertainment announced a new hip hop project on November 17 by G-Dragon collaborating with another artist. The following day, Taeyang was revealed to be a part of the project. A teaser trailer was released on November 20 announcing that the single would be named "Good Boy" and was set to be released on November 21. The track topped South Korean online music services and iTunes charts in seven countries upon its release.

A music video directed by Colin Tilley was released to promote the single. As of April 2016, "Good Boy" surpassed 100 million views on YouTube, making BigBang the first Korean boy group to have three music videos pass this mark. The video went on to be featured as a YouTube Music Moment for the 2015 YouTube Music Awards.

A dance practice video was also released, showing the dance choreography by Parris Goebel.

== Critical reception ==
"Good Boy" received generally favorable reviews. The song was dubbed an "amazing club song" by Fuse, who also called it one of the best 10 songs of November 2014, writing that it "[i]s a huge EDM/hip hop banger that feels like the next 'Turn Down for What'". It also ranked as one of Fuse's "41 Best Songs of 2014" at No. 15.

Billboard gave a positive review, stating, "[G-Dragon & Taeyang are] at the top of the vocal, rap and dance game in one of the year's most epic club tracks", and listed the single at number three in their "Best K-Pop Songs of 2014" list, feeling that the duo "hardly feels like a collaboration, but more like a cohesive artist."

Justin Block from Complex felt that "Good Boy" will "instantly have your face all the scrunched up when the drop hits", making it "quite impossible to not feel yourself to G-Dragon and Taeyang" on the song.

== Accolades ==
Awards for "Good Boy"
Year	Organization	Award	Result	Ref.
2015	YouTube Music Awards	Honored Artist	Won	

Music program wins for "Good Boy"
Program	Date	Ref.
Inkigayo (SBS)	November 30, 2014	
Inkigayo (SBS)	January 4, 2015	

== Track listing and formats ==
- Digital download
1. "Good Boy" – 4:05
- CD single
1. "Good Boy" – 4:05
2. "Good Boy" (a cappella) – 4:05
3. "Good Boy" (Instrumental) – 4:05
4. "Good Boy" (MR) – 4:05

== Commercial performance ==
"Good Boy" debuted at number five on South Korea's Gaon Digital Chart, with 169,139 downloads. The physical edition, released a month later, topped the Gaon Album Chart upon release.

The song peaked at number one on Billboard's World Digital Songs chart, marking the third time a Korean act had topped the chart after Psy and 2NE1.

== Charts ==
=== Weekly charts ===
Weekly chart performance for "Good Boy"
Chart (2014)	Peak position
Finland Download (Latauslista)	21
Japan Hot 100 (Billboard)	45
South Korea (Gaon)	5
South Korean Albums (Gaon)	1
US World Digital Songs (Billboard)	1

=== Year-end charts ===
Year-end chart performance for "Good Boy"
Chart (2014)	Position
South Korea (Gaon)	97
US World Digital Songs (Billboard)	13
Chart (2015)	Position
South Korea (Gaon)	92

=== Sales ===
Country	Sales
South Korea (Gaon)	1,260,683 (digital)
South Korea (Gaon)	25,000 (physical)
United States (Billboard)	5,000
