= A Boy =

Song by G-Dragon

from the album Heartbreaker
- Language: Korean
- Released: August 18, 2009
- Recorded: 2009
- Studio: YG (Seoul)
- Genre: K-pop; dance-pop; funk; electro-hip hop
- Length: 3:29
- Label: YG
- Composers: Choice37; G-Dragon
- Lyricist: G-Dragon
- Producers: G-Dragon; Choice37

Music video
- "A Boy" on YouTube

"A Boy" (Korean: 소년이여; RR: Sonyeoniyeo) is a song by South Korean rapper G-Dragon from his debut studio album Heartbreaker (2009). G-Dragon stated that the song was released as an answer to the plagiarism controversy that surrounded his songs "Heartbreaker" and "Butterfly" when several people were telling him to quit singing, with G-Dragon answering that he "will not quit."

== Release ==
Although the end of G-Dragon's music video for "Breathe" included a teaser for the music video of "A Boy", the music video for "Butterfly" was released instead. A couple of weeks after the release of "Butterfly", "A Boy" was officially confirmed and released as the fourth and final music video for the album. G-Dragon stated that the song's lyrics, which were written by himself, were about the thoughts and struggles he went through as a young boy when he became YG trainee at the age of 13.

== Music video ==
Similar to the music video of "Butterfly", "A Boy"'s music video is heavily composed of computer graphics. Unlike that of his previous music videos (which included either a stylized dance or a storyline), the music featured various changing graphics and G-Dragon singing. The music video expresses G-Dragon's emotions and his struggles explained in the lyrics of the song.

== Charts ==
Chart performance for "A Boy"
Chart (2025)	Peak position
South Korea (Circle)	190
