= Niliria =

Single by G-Dragon

from the album Coup d'Etat
- Released: September 5, 2013
- Recorded: 2011–2012
- Genre: K-pop; hip hop
- Length: 2:52
- Label: YG Entertainment
- Composers: G-Dragon; Teddy
- Lyricists: G-Dragon; Missy Elliott

G-Dragon singles chronology
"Black" / "Who You?" (2013)	"Niliria" / "Crooked" (2013)	"Good Boy" (2014)

Audio video
- "Niliria" (G-Dragon version) on YouTube "Niliria" (Missy Elliott version) on YouTube

"Niliria" is a song by South Korean rapper G-Dragon. It was released on September 5, 2013 by YG Entertainment alongside "Crooked" as the third and fourth singles from his second studio album, Coup d'Etat (2013). A version of the song featuring American rapper and singer Missy Elliott was also released as a track on the album.

The Missy Elliott version of "Niliria" became one of the six songs from Coup d'Etat to enter the top ten on South Korea's Gaon Digital Chart. On 2 December 2013, the song ranked number 32 on Complex's The 50 Best Songs of 2013.

== Background ==
Vocals for the song were recorded in 2011 via e-mail and telephone. On 23 January 2013, Missy Elliott revealed via Twitter that she had worked with G-Dragon on the track alongside another titled "Chugalug," which was never released. Both songs were chiefly produced by Teddy Park. In June 2013, G-Dragon's label YG Entertainment released a statement discussing the making of the song and went in-depth of Elliott's involvement. The label stated that the song "[broke] away from the convention with a hint of Korean taste," and added that "the tinge of a voice sample from [the] Korean traditional folk song 'Nilliliya' [made] it a one-of-a-kind, classy hip-hop track." G-Dragon at first did not think about including Elliott during the early recording process because of the motive of using a traditional Korean folk song. However, he felt a strong desire to feature "more of a past" female artist, and enlisted Elliott in the midst of it all because he was a fan of her work.

== Composition ==
"Niliria' is inspired by and samples a traditional Korean folk song of the same name, turning its beat into "a piece of booming club music," with "a few electro and 808 flourishes thrown in the mix." The composition also includes "sirens and clattering hand percussion" and the vocals were described as "chopped-up". The song's production was noted for being ethnic and surrealist, which drew comparisons to the work of Timbaland.

== Live performances ==
The song was performed with Missy Elliott in Los Angeles, California at the KCON 2013 venue, M! Countdown: What's Up LA. G-Dragon stated that performing with Elliott "was such an honor," and that he "learned a lot." The Hollywood Reporter praised the performance, saying the rappers "with their combined corps of backup dancers, looked utterly comfortable onstage together." Spin hailed the performance a "thrilling cross-continental pop moment."

== Charts ==
Chart performance for "Niliria" (G-Dragon version)
Chart (2013)	Peak position
South Korea (Gaon)	32
South Korea (K-pop Hot 100)	38

Chart performance for "Niliria" (Missy Elliott version)
Chart (2013)	Peak position
South Korea (Gaon)	9
South Korea (K-pop Hot 100)	30
US World Digital Song Sales (Billboard)	8
