= Crooked (song) =

2013 single by G-Dragon

Single by G-Dragon

from the album Coup d'Etat
- Released: September 5, 2013
- Genre: Pop punk; rap rock
- Length: 3:42
- Label: YG
- Songwriters: Teddy; G-Dragon
- Producers: Teddy; G-Dragon

G-Dragon singles chronology
"Black" / "Who You?" (2013)	"Crooked" / "Niliria" (2013)	"Good Boy" (2014)

Music video
- "Crooked" on YouTube

"Crooked" (삐딱하게; ppittaghage) is a song recorded by South Korean rapper G-Dragon. It was released on September 5, 2013 by YG Entertainment alongside "Niliria" as the third and fourth singles from his second studio album, Coup d'Etat (2013). It was written and produced by Teddy and G-Dragon. A pop-punk song, "Crooked" peaked at number three at the Gaon Digital Chart and became one of his most successful singles.

== Writing and composition ==
"Crooked" was described as a "synthed-up, deliriously catchy pop-punk" with a "neon-bright" sound. The track fuses "heavy drumbeats and metal guitar riffs", besides featuring a "heavy bass line and fully amplified sound at the chorus." In the track, G-Dragon mixes rap with singing. Lyrically, the single describes a man "full of angst and despair" that demands to be left alone as he spends the night "like a 'crooked-minded person,' because in the end, he's alone and doesn't need anyone's 'sugarcoated sympathy.'"

The song's producer, Teddy Park, commented about the song's placement in the album, stating that "[W]e felt like the album had a lot of trap music, some R&B records, and some club tracks. But GD's like a punk rocker at the same time. He raps and shit, but he really loves that whole punk attitude. So we needed a track that could express that." Additionally, G-Dragon revealed that "Crooked" was "intended to make the audience go crazy during live shows", so the raps and chorus were made "to sound extra catchy so people could easily sing and dance to it."

== Critical reception ==
"Crooked" received positive reviews. Corban Goble of Pitchfork wrote that it "might just be a song you'll play 30 times in a row and never play again, but those 30 listens are pure serotonin-fueled bliss." In a review of the album for MTV, Alexis Stephens stated that G-Dragon's songs like "Crooked" "exude opulence in a way that's increasingly rare outside of Korea." "Crooked" was voted as MTV Iggy's Song of the Year, with the website commenting that "G-Dragon made a big splash in the world of K-pop and beyond with his solo album Coup d'Etat. 'Crooked' from that album was the endlessly playable sound of him breaking big."

== Commercial performance ==
With only three days since its release, "Crooked" debuted at number seven on Gaon's Digital and Download charts, charting behind four of his songs that topped the chart, and selling 160,893 digital downloads. On the second week, the song rose to number three in Digital chart and number two in Download chart, selling 162,815 copies. "Crooked" became one of the best performing singles of the year, with 1,106,269 downloads and 29.6 million streams by the end of 2013.

"Crooked" debuted on Billboard's K-pop Hot 100 at number two, becoming his highest-peaking entry on the chart. The song also peaked at number five on Billboard's World Digital Songs. "Crooked" won a total on four music program awards. The single competed with G-Dragon's others songs from the same album, "Black", "Who You" and "Coup d'Etat". As all the songs have won at least one time, the artist became the first act ever to win multiple music shows with four different songs from a single album.

== Music video ==
The music video for "Crooked" was released on September 4, 2013. The video was filmed in England, in a grand-scale approach that required a budget of about three to four times larger than the record company's usual music videos. G-Dragon puts on 16 different outfits in total, including T-shirts honoring the punk bands Black Flag and Sex Pistols. In the video, the rapper runs through the London underground while causing fights and destruction at clubs. Spin commented that "Crooked" is "no less visually dazzling" that the other music videos from the album, describing it as a "rapid-paced clip" toying with "first-generation punk iconography." Fuse named it one of G-Dragon "must-see videos". It became his first solo music video to hit 100 million views on YouTube in January 2017.

== Live performances ==
G-Dragon performed the song for the first time on the final shows of his One of a Kind World Tour in Seoul on August 31 and September 1. Later, the first televised performance was held on the talk show You Hee-yeol's Sketchbook on September 6. The first performance at a music show took place on SBS's Inkigayo on September 8, 2013. On M Countdown the single was performed with the then YG trainees, iKon and Winner, who were at the time appearing in the survival audition program, WIN: Who Is Next, acting as backup dancers. "Crooked" was performed at the 2013 Mnet Asian Music Awards. BigBang's single "Sober" was used as a prelude to the performance two years before its release. The rapper also performed "Crooked" at his second world tour, Act III: M.O.T.T.E.

== Awards ==
Awards and nominations for "Crooked"
Year	Organization	Award	Result	Ref.
2013	Mnet Asian Music Awards	Best Dance Performance – Male Solo	Won	
2013	Mnet Asian Music Awards	Song of the Year	Nominated	
2013	MTV Iggy	Song of the Year	Won	
2014	Golden Disc Awards	Digital Bonsang	Nominated	
2014	Golden Disc Awards	Popularity Award	Nominated	
2014	Korean Music Awards	Best Dance & Electronic Song	Nominated	
2014	Singapore Entertainment Awards	Most Popular K-pop Music Video	Nominated	

Music program wins
Program	Date	Ref.
Inkigayo	September 22, 2013	
Inkigayo	September 29, 2013	
M! Countdown	September 26, 2013	
Music Bank	September 27, 2013	

== Impact ==
In 2024, during protests in Seoul following the 2024 South Korean martial law and calling for the impeachment of President Yoon Suk Yeol, demonstrators sung "Crooked" in the streets of the city along with other K-pop songs including Aespa's "Whiplash", 2NE1's "I Am the Best", and Girls' Generation's "Into the New World".

== Charts ==
=== Weekly charts ===
Chart	Peak position
South Korea (Gaon)	3
South Korea (K-pop Hot 100)	2
US World Digital Songs (Billboard)	5

=== Year-end charts ===
Chart	Peak position
South Korea (Gaon)	72
South Korea (K-pop Hot 100)	44

== Sales ==
Country	Sales
China	910,600
South Korea	1,814,075

== Certifications ==
Certifications for "Crooked"
Region	Certification	Certified units/sales
Japan (RIAJ) Japanese version	Gold	100,000^{*}
Streaming
Japan (RIAJ) Japanese version	Gold	50,000,000^{†}
^{*} Sales figures based on certification alone.^{†} Streaming-only figures based on certification alone.
