= Breathe (G-Dragon song) =

Song by G-Dragon

from the album Heartbreaker
- Released: August 18, 2009
- Recorded: 2009
- Genre: Dance-pop; electrohop; post-disco; R&B
- Length: 3:43
- Label: YG Entertainment
- Songwriters: G-Dragon; Jimmy Thörnfeldt

Music video
- "Breathe" on YouTube

"Breathe" (Korean: 브리드) is a song by South Korean rapper G-Dragon from his debut album, Heartbreaker (2007). A music video for the song was released on September 21, 2009. While the song did not chart as high as the album's title track, it still reached the top 20 of the Korean music chart.

== Release ==
Amid controversy of the singer's previous single being accused of plagiarism, G-Dragon quickly released the music video for "Breathe" to promote his album. The song managed to chart within the Top 20 of the Korean music chart. The lyrics, which portray the singer not wanting to wake up from a dream, was complimented by a writer for the Newsen as "strong" and "impressive."

== Music video ==
Similar to "Heartbreaker"'s music video, "Breathe" showcased the singer dancing against a white backdrop. The video itself was given a 20-second teaser at the end of "Heartbreaker"'s music video before its official release. At the end of the music video, a short teaser of his next song "A Boy" is shown. The video has drawn over 14 million views on YouTube.

== Controversy ==
While performing the song "Breathe" at his Shine a Light concert, G-Dragon was alleged to have "made sexually provocative gestures" when he reportedly grinded against his dancer against a propped-up bed. The Korean Ministry of Health, Welfare and Family Affairs later asked the government prosecutors to investigate if G-Dragon or YG Entertainment violated laws on obscene performances at his concert. He was found innocent and was cleared of all charges on March 15, 2010.
