= Heartbreaker (G-Dragon album) =

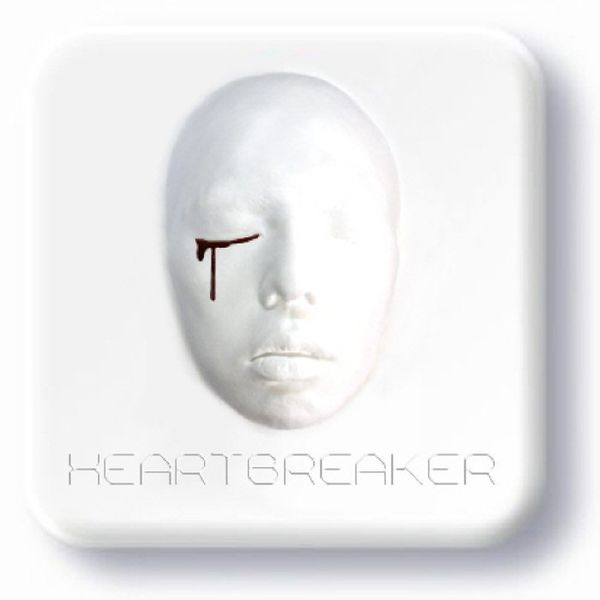

Studio album by G-Dragon
- Released: August 18, 2009
- Recorded: 2009
- Studio: YG (Seoul)
- Genre: K-pop; hip hop; dance-pop; R&B
- Length: 35:52
- Language: Korean
- Label: YG
- Producer: G-Dragon; Choice37; Teddy Park; Kush; Jimmy Thornfeldt

G-Dragon chronology
Heartbreaker (2009)	Shine a Light (2010)

Singles from Heartbreaker
- 1. "Heartbreaker" Released: August 18, 2009

Alternative cover
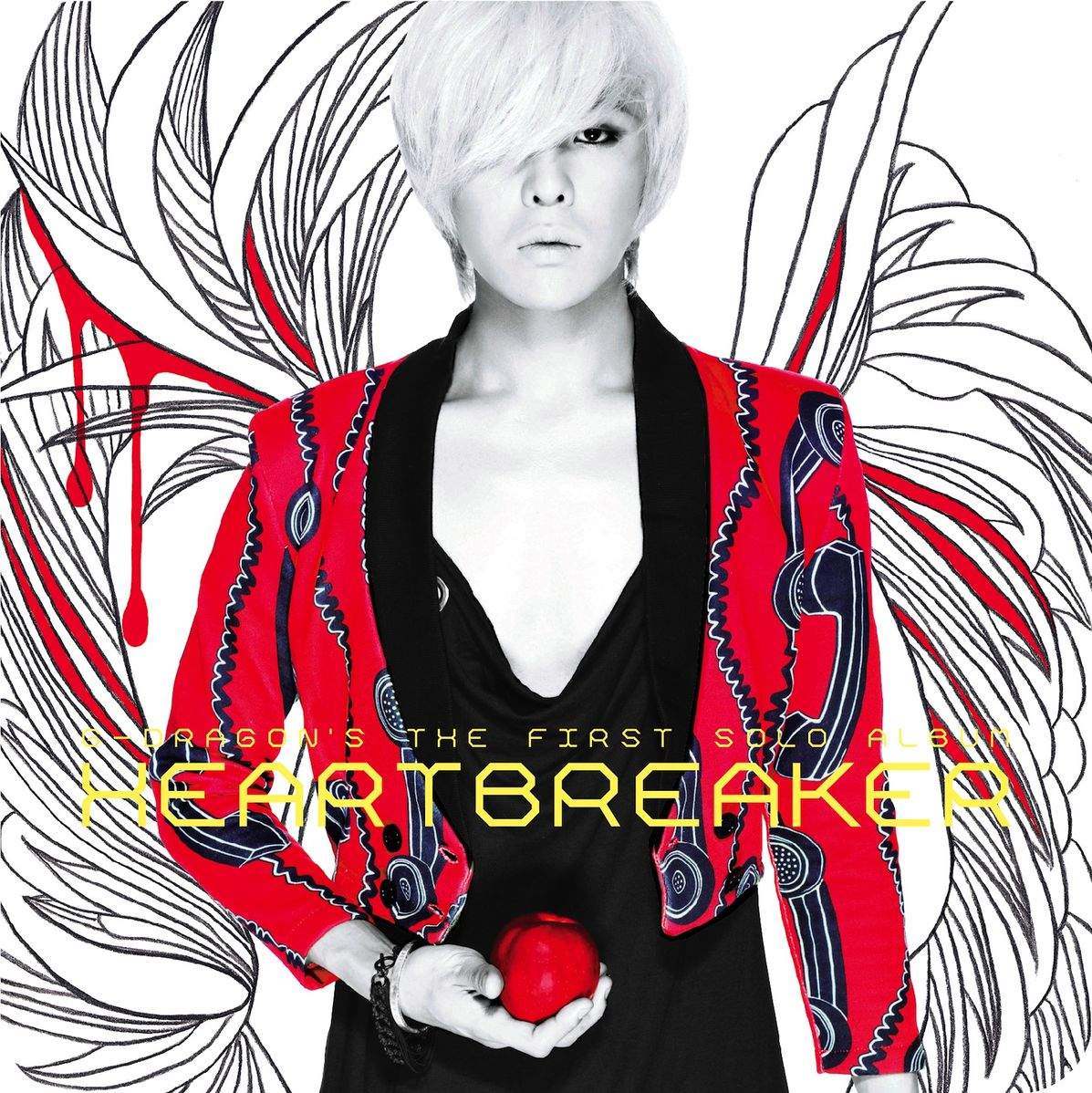
- 2011 reissue album artwork

Heartbreaker is the debut studio album by South Korean rapper G-Dragon. The album's chart-topping single "Heartbreaker" became one of the best selling singles in South Korea of all time, having sold over 4 million copies since its release.

== Release and singles ==
Although initially scheduled to be released in April, the release date was pushed back to August to coincide with his 21st birthday. G-Dragon collaborated with several YG labelmates, including Teddy Park of 1TYM, bandmate Taeyang, and CL and Dara of 2NE1. The lead single "Heartbreaker" landed at number-one on multiple charts, including the Mnet and Melon Music chart, while "Breathe" was ranked in the Top 20. "A Boy" described the personal struggles he went through as he started in the entertainment industry at the age of 6, eventually becoming a trainee at YG Entertainment when he was 12. "The Leaders", which featured Teddy and CL, referenced Girls' Generation's song "Gee", Kim Kyu Jong (of SS501)'s "Wuss Up", and 2NE1's "I Don't Care".

== Controversy ==
G-Dragon was accused of plagiarism by Sony Music, as his tracks "Heartbreaker" and "Butterfly" were thought to be similar to Flo Rida's "Right Round" and Oasis's "She's Electric", respectively. EMI, who also owned the rights to "Right Round" stated they saw no similarities between the two songs. In response, Sony Korea denied G-Dragon the ability to promote the track any further without paying reparations. On September 21, 2009, Sisa Magazine, a news program on MBC, stated that officials from Sony reportedly sent YG Entertainment warning letters about plagiarism. Sony's legal representative stated, "It was a hard decision for the music critics." However, they decided that there were similarities and accordingly issued a warning letter to the production company and composers. However, YG Entertainment claimed nothing had been decided or legally determined and that the "letter" which YG received from Sony was not considered legal action; they also stated they have not received a direct response from the American publishers regarding the matter. On March 6, 2010, YG Entertainment announced that they personally contacted Flo Rida's representatives and that he will appear as a featured artist in a new version of "Heartbreaker", to be released as a bonus track on G-Dragon's concert album Shine a Light. On May 22, G-Dragon appeared as a special guest at Flo Rida's concert in Korea and performed the new version of "Heartbreaker".

== Accolades ==
Awards
Year	Award-giving body	Category	Result	Ref.
2009	Hanteo Music Awards	Hanteo Award	Won	
2009	Mnet Asian Music Awards	Album of the Year	Won	
2009	Melon Music Awards	Album of the Year	Won	

== Track listing ==
All lyrics are written by G-Dragon; "The Leaders" co-written with Teddy and CL.

No.	Title	Music	Arrangement	Length
1.	"A Boy" (소년이여; Sonyeoniyeo)	G-Dragon; Choice37	Choice37	3:29
2.	"Heartbreaker"	G-Dragon; Jimmy Thornfeldt	Jimmy Thornfeldt	3:22
3.	"Breathe"	G-Dragon; Jimmy Thornfeldt	Jimmy Thornfeldt	3:27
4.	"Butterfly" (featuring Jin Jung)	Choice37; G-Dragon	Choice37	3:42
5.	"Hello" (featuring Dara)	Kush; G-Dragon	Kush	3:17
6.	"Gossip Man" (featuring Kim Gunmo)	Teddy; G-Dragon	Teddy	3:31
7.	"Korean Dream" (featuring Taeyang)	G-Dragon; Jimmy Thornfeldt	Jimmy Thornfeldt	3:16
8.	"The Leaders" (featuring Teddy and CL)	Teddy	Teddy	3:48
9.	"She's Gone" (featuring Kush)	Kush; G-Dragon	Kush	3:44
10.	"1 Year Station" (1년 정거장; Ilnyeon Jeonggeojang)	Kush; G-Dragon	Kush	4:04
Total length:				35:52

== Sales ==
Country	Sales amount
South Korea	309,343

== Release history ==
Region	Date	Format	Distributing Label	Ref.
South Korea	August 18, 2009	digital download	YG Entertainment	
South Korea	August 21, 2009	CD	YG Entertainment; Mnet Media Corp.	
South Korea	June 20, 2011 (Reissue)	CD	YG Entertainment; KMP Holdings	
Taiwan	September 28, 2012	CD+DVD (limited edition)	Warner Music Taiwan	
