= Heartbreaker (G-Dragon song) =

2009 single by G-Dragon

Single by G-Dragon

from the album Heartbreaker
- Released: August 18, 2009
- Recorded: 2009
- Genre: K-pop; Europop; dance; synthpop
- Length: 3:23
- Label: YG Entertainment
- Composers: G-Dragon; Jimmy Thörnfeldt
- Lyricists: G-Dragon; Jimmy Thörnfeldt

G-Dragon singles chronology
"Rain Is Fallin'" (2009)	"Heartbreaker" (2009)	"I Need a Girl" (2010)

Audio sample
- file; help

Music video
- "Heartbreaker" on YouTube

"Heartbreaker" is a song by South Korean rapper G-Dragon. It was released on August 18, 2009, as the lead single from his debut studio album Heartbreaker (2009). Upon release, it topped many online download charts including Mnet and Melon. The single went on to sell over 3 million digital downloads by the end of 2009, and further sold a cumulative 4,407,355 digital units by the end 2011. A remix, released as part of G-Dragon's first live album Shine a Light on March 30, 2010, features American rapper Flo Rida.

== Music video ==
The music video opens with G-Dragon in a lit up room a wearing black outfit, gloves, and shades. It then transitions to him wearing a silver and black outfit with a heart around his eye. He is in a futuristic styled room, sitting on a couch underneath an apple tree surrounded by many women. As he sings, he drinks a beverage from a can, and is seen with a holographic girl whispering in his ear. When the chorus begins, he is then seen dancing against a white backdrop, accompanied by male backup dancers in masks. When the second verse begins, G-Dragon is seen underneath a sheet eating an apple, where the bite marks are in the shape of a heart. He is also seen dancing against a black backdrop wearing a tuxedo, accompanied by female backup dancers.

When the chorus begins again, he dances in front of the same backdrop wearing a silver vest, accompanied by the same masked male dancers. He is then seen in the same lit up room from the beginning, wearing a red, telephone design printed jacket. As he sings the bridge, he walks down a hall where there are many apples on the walls. As he touches one, he sees a hologram of his "heartbreaker" and tries to reach for her. A brick wall then appears and blocks him from her. While he sings the final lines of the song, he begins punching the wall. When he finally breaks it, he falls to the ground and looks up, only to find himself in the arms of his loved one. The video ends with a teaser of G-Dragon's music video for Breathe.

The music video was a hit on GomTV, where it reportedly gained 5 million views in just 18 days. With the success of his video, G-Dragon was awarded the "Artist of the Month" from GomTV.

== Controversy ==
G-Dragon was accused of plagiarism by Sony Music that "Heartbreaker" contained similarities to Flo Rida's "Right Round" (2009). EMI, who also had rights to "Right Round" stated they saw no similarities between the two songs. Sony Korea denied G-Dragon the ability to promote the track any further without paying reparations. On September 21, 2009, Sisa Magazine, a news program on MBC, stated that officials from Sony reportedly sent YG Entertainment warning letters about plagiarism. Sony's legal representative stated, "It was a hard decision for the music critics", however, they decided that there were similarities and accordingly issued a warning letter to the production company and its composers. However, YG Entertainment claimed that nothing was decided or legally determined and that the "letter" which YG received from Sony was not considered legal action; the company also stated they have not received a direct response from the American publishers regarding this matter.

=== Remix ===
On March 6, 2010, YG Entertainment announced that they had personally contacted Flo Rida's representatives and that the rapper will appear as the featured artist in a new version of "Heartbreaker", to be included as a bonus track on G-Dragon's first live album Shine a Light, which was released on March 30, 2010. The remix peaked at number eight on the Gaon Digital Chart.

== Track listing ==
- Digital download / streaming
1. "Heartbreaker" – 3:23
- Heartbreaker – Remixes
1. Heartbreaker (featuring Flo Rida) – 3:24
2. Heartbreaker (Choice 37 Remix) – 3:37

== Accolades ==
Awards for "Heartbreaker"
Year	Organization	Award	Result	Ref.
2009	Cyworld Digital Music Awards	Song of the Month (September)	Won	
2009	Cyworld Digital Music Awards	Ting's Choice Award	Won	
2009	Cyworld Digital Music Awards	Bonsang Award	Won	
2009	Mnet Asian Music Awards	Best Male Solo Artist	Nominated	
2009	Mnet Asian Music Awards	Best House & Electronic	Nominated	

Music program awards
Program	Date
Music Bank	August 28, 2009
Music Bank	September 4, 2009
Music Bank	September 11, 2009
Music Bank	September 18, 2009
Music Bank	September 25, 2009
Inkigayo	September 6, 2009
Inkigayo	September 13, 2009
Inkigayo	September 20, 2009
M Countdown	September 10, 2009
M Countdown	September 17, 2009
M Countdown	September 24, 2009

== Charts ==
Chart performance for "Heartbreaker"
Chart (2025)	Peak position
South Korea (Circle)	173

Chart performance for "Heartbreaker" (remix)
Chart (2010)	Peak position
South Korea (Gaon)	8
