= One of a Kind =

One of a Kind may refer to:

== Film and television ==
- One of a Kind (film), a 2013 French film
- One of a Kind (game show), a 1958–1959 Canadian panel show
- One of a Kind (TV series), a 1978 Canadian children's series

=== Television episodes ===
- "One of a Kind", ABC Afterschool Special season 7, episode 1 (1978)
- "One of a Kind", Brandy & Mr. Whiskers season 1, episode 30 (2005)
- "One of a Kind", Danny Phantom season 1, episode 3 (2004)
- "One of a Kind", Diners, Drive-Ins and Dives season 2, episode 8 (2007)
- "One-of-a-Kind", Instinct season 2, episode 6 (2019)
- "One of a Kind", Jay Leno's Garage season 4, episode 7 (2018)
- "One of a Kind", Knots Landing season 3, episode 6 (1981)
- "One of a Kind", Photon episode 14 (1986)
- "One of a Kind", The Hogan Family season 2, episode 7 (1986)
- "One of a Kind", Thunderbirds 2086 episode 6 (1982)
- "One of a Kind", Say Yes to the Dress season 7, episode 4 (2011)

== Literature ==
- One of a Kind, a 2024 novel by Jane Lovering

== Music ==
=== Albums ===
- One of a Kind (Bruford album) or the title song, 1979
- One of a Kind (Dave Grusin album), 1977
- One of a Kind (Moe Bandy album) or the title song, 1979
- One of a Kind (Pandora album) or the title song (see below), 1993
- One of a Kind (Tammy Wynette album) or the title song (see below), 1977
- One of a Kind, by Della Reese, 1978
- One of a Kind, by Orleans, or the title song, 1982
- One of a Kind, a mixtape by Russ Millions, 2023

=== EPs ===
- One of a Kind (G-Dragon EP) or the title song (see below), 2012
- One of a Kind (Loossemble EP), 2024
- One of a Kind (Monsta X EP), 2021

=== Songs ===
- "One of a Kind" (G-Dragon song), 2012
- "One of a Kind" (Pandora song), 1994
- "One of a Kind" (Tammy Wynette song), 1977
- "One of a Kind (Love Affair)", by the Spinners, 1973
- "One of a Kind", by Bosson from Rockstar, 2003
- "One of a Kind", by Breaking Point from Coming of Age, 2001

== See also ==
- Two of a Kind
- Three of a Kind
- Four of a kind
- Five of a kind
- Category:One-of-a-kind computers
- Rob Van Dam
