= Übermensch World Tour =

2025 concert tour by G-Dragon

- Tour by G-Dragon
- Location: Asia; Oceania; North America; Europe
- Associated album: Übermensch
- Start date: March 29, 2025
- End date: December 14, 2025
- Legs: 4
- No. of shows: 39
- Attendance: 825,000
- Box office: $102.2million (32 shows)

G-Dragon concert chronology
- Act III: M.O.T.T.E World Tour (2017); Übermensch World Tour (2025)

The Übermensch World Tour was the third concert tour by South Korean rapper and singer-songwriter G-Dragon, held in support of his third studio album Übermensch (2025). It marks his first concert tour in eight years since the Act III: M.O.T.T.E World Tour (2017). The Übermensch World Tour began at the Goyang Stadium in South Korea on March 29, 2025. The tour gathered total 825,000 fans from 39 shows, making it the largest tour conducted by a Korean solo act in history.

== Background ==
On February 6, 2025, G-Dragon's agency Galaxy Corporation announced that G-Dragon would hold a world tour in support of his then-upcoming studio album Übermensch, set for release on February 25. A week later, it was revealed that the tour would begin at the Goyang Stadium in Goyang, South Korea on March 29 and 30. On March 19, fourteen dates were unveiled in East and Southeast Asia (Phase 1). On May 13, new four dates were unveiled in Australia and Thailand (Phase 2), with the show in Thailand being cancelled later.

On June 16, four new dates were announced in the United States and France (Phase 3). On September 12, the phase 4 of the tour was announced with 2 shows in Taipei and one in Hanoi. The encore shows in Osaka and Seoul were also added to the phase 4 of the tour.

On October 10, due to high demand, the second show in Hanoi on November 9 was announced.

== Philanthropy ==
G-Dragon donated ₩300 million ($200,000) of the concert profits held in South Korea to support the recovery efforts of the wildfire crises in Gyeongsang-do and Ulsan.

== Set list ==
This set list represents the show on March 29, 2025, in Goyang, South Korea. It does not represent all dates.

Act I

1. Intro + "Power"
2. "Home Sweet Home"
3. "Super Star"
4. "Middle Fingers-Up"
5. "One of a Kind"
6. "R.O.D" (featuring CL) (contains elements of "Fein" and "Dirty Vibe")
7. "The Leaders" (featuring CL)
8. "Crayon" (contains elements of "Crazy Dog")

Act II

1. "Bonamana"
2. "That XX"
3. "Butterfly"
4. "I Love It"
5. "Who You"
6. "Today"
7. "Crooked"

Act III

1. "Heartbreaker" (featuring Wing) (contains elements of "Shake the World")
2. "Bullshit" (contains elements of "Not Like Us" and "Zutter")
3. "Take Me"
4. "Too Bad" (contains elements of "Like I Love You" and "Get Lucky")
5. "Drama"

Encore

1. "A Boy"
2. "This Love"
3. "1 Year"
4. "IBelongiiu"
5. "Untitled, 2014"
6. "Home Sweet Home"

=== Notes ===
- At the March 30 show in Goyang, "Super Star" , "That XX" and "A Boy" were not performed.
- At the March 30 show, Taeyang and Daesung joined G-Dragon onstage and performed "Last Dance", "We Like 2 Party" and "Home Sweet Home".
- Beginning with the May 10 show, "The Leaders", "Super Star", "That XX" and "R.O.D" were not performed.
- Beginning with May 10 show in Tokyo, "GYRO-DROP" was performed during the encore.
- Beginning with the May 11 show, "A Boy" was moved to the third act and performed in a VCR format.
- Beginning with the May 17 show in Bulacan, "Middle Fingers-Up" was replaced by "MichiGO".
- At the June 6 show in Macau, "Untitled, 2014" was not performed.
- From the August 31 show in Las Vegas to the September 20 show in Paris, "Can't Help Falling in Love" was performed during the encore.
- At the September 20 show in Paris, "Too Bad" was performed as a remix featuring new elements of "Lady Marmalade," instead of "Get Lucky." This was changed back to the original at the October 20 show in Osaka.
- At the December 13 show in Seoul "Too Bad" was performed as a remix featuring elements of "Lady Marmalade," instead of "Get Lucky" once again.
- At the December 14 show, Taeyang and Daesung joined G-Dragon onstage and performed "Home Sweet Home", "We Like 2 Party" and “A Fool Of Tears”.
- At the December 14 show, "Can't Help Falling in Love" was played during the encore.

== Tour dates ==
List of concert dates
| Date | City | Country | Venue | Attendance | Revenue |
|---|---|---|---|---|---|
| March 29, 2025 | Goyang | South Korea | Goyang Stadium | 68,000/68,000 | $7,900,000 |
| March 30, 2025 | Goyang | South Korea | Goyang Stadium | 68,000/68,000 | $7,900,000 |
| May 10, 2025 | Tokyo | Japan | Tokyo Dome | 96,830 / 96,830 | $11,866,718 |
| May 11, 2025 | Tokyo | Japan | Tokyo Dome | 96,830 / 96,830 | $11,866,718 |
| May 17, 2025 | Bocaue | Philippines | Philippine Arena | — | — |
| May 25, 2025 | Osaka | Japan | Kyocera Dome | 78,632 / 78,632 | $9,649,214 |
| May 26, 2025 | Osaka | Japan | Kyocera Dome | 78,632 / 78,632 | $9,649,214 |
| June 6, 2025 | Macau | | Galaxy Arena | 36,000 / 36,000 | $6,363,111 |
| June 7, 2025 | Macau | | Galaxy Arena | 36,000 / 36,000 | $6,363,111 |
| June 8, 2025 | Macau | | Galaxy Arena | 36,000 / 36,000 | $6,363,111 |
| July 2, 2025 | Sydney | Australia | Qudos Bank Arena | (Note: The score data is combined from the nine shows held in United States, Sydney and Paris from 2, 3 July / 22, 23, 31 August / 5, 6 September 2025, respectively.) | |
| July 3, 2025 | Sydney | Australia | Qudos Bank Arena | (Note: The score data is combined from the nine shows held in United States, Sydney and Paris from 2, 3 July / 22, 23, 31 August / 5, 6 September 2025, respectively.) | |
| July 6, 2025 | Melbourne | Australia | Rod Laver Arena | 21,913 / 21,913 | $3,944,307 |
| July 7, 2025 | Melbourne | Australia | Rod Laver Arena | 21,913 / 21,913 | $3,944,307 |
| July 11, 2025 | Taipei | Taiwan | Taipei Arena | 36,000 / 36,000 | $7,180,000 |
| July 12, 2025 | Taipei | Taiwan | Taipei Arena | 36,000 / 36,000 | $7,180,000 |
| July 13, 2025 | Taipei | Taiwan | Taipei Arena | 36,000 / 36,000 | $7,180,000 |
| July 19, 2025 | Kuala Lumpur | Malaysia | Axiata Arena | 20,000 / 20,000 | — |
| July 20, 2025 | Kuala Lumpur | Malaysia | Axiata Arena | 20,000 / 20,000 | — |
| July 25, 2025 | Jakarta | Indonesia | Indonesia Arena | 22,000 / 22,000 | — |
| July 26, 2025 | Jakarta | Indonesia | Indonesia Arena | 22,000 / 22,000 | — |
| August 8, 2025 | Hong Kong | | AsiaWorld–Arena | 33,245 / 33,245 | $7,618,970 |
| August 9, 2025 | Hong Kong | | AsiaWorld–Arena | 33,245 / 33,245 | $7,618,970 |
| August 10, 2025 | Hong Kong | | AsiaWorld–Arena | 33,245 / 33,245 | $7,618,970 |
| August 22, 2025 | Newark | United States | Prudential Center | 117,000 / 117,000 | $27,100,000 |
| August 23, 2025 | Newark | United States | Prudential Center | 117,000 / 117,000 | $27,100,000 |
| August 31, 2025 | Las Vegas | United States | T-Mobile Arena | 117,000 / 117,000 | $27,100,000 |
| September 5, 2025 | Los Angeles | United States | Crypto.com Arena | 117,000 / 117,000 | $27,100,000 |
| September 6, 2025 | Los Angeles | United States | Crypto.com Arena | 117,000 / 117,000 | $27,100,000 |
| September 20, 2025 | Paris | France | Paris La Défense Arena | 117,000 / 117,000 | $27,100,000 |
| October 20, 2025 | Osaka (Note: Promoted as Encore show) | Japan | Kyocera Dome | 78,632 / 78,632 | — |
| October 21, 2025 | Osaka | Japan | Kyocera Dome | 78,632 / 78,632 | — |
| November 1, 2025 | Taipei | Taiwan | Taipei Dome | 80,000 / 80,000 | $13,800,000 |
| November 2, 2025 | Taipei | Taiwan | Taipei Dome | 80,000 / 80,000 | $13,800,000 |
| November 8, 2025 | Hưng Yên (Note: The city is labelled as Hanoi on promotional materials, disregarding city boundaries) | Vietnam | Vinhomes Ocean Park 3 (Note: The venue is labelled as 8Wonder Ocean City, named after the promoter.) | 100,000 / 100,000 | — |
| November 9, 2025 | Hưng Yên | Vietnam | Vinhomes Ocean Park 3 | 100,000 / 100,000 | — |
| December 12, 2025 | Seoul | South Korea | Gocheok Sky Dome | 54,000/54,000 | — |
| December 13, 2025 | Seoul | South Korea | Gocheok Sky Dome | 54,000/54,000 | — |
| December 14, 2025 | Seoul | South Korea | Gocheok Sky Dome | 54,000/54,000 | — |
| Total | | | | 825,000 | $99,132,320 |

=== Cancelled shows ===
List of cancelled concerts
| Date | City | Country | Venue | Reason |
|---|---|---|---|---|
| August 2, 2025 | Bangkok | Thailand | Rajamangala Stadium | Unforeseen circumstances |
