= G-Dragon Media Exhibition: Übermensch =

Art exhibition by G-Dragon

- Founder: G-Dragon
- Purpose: To provide a view of G-Dragon Übermensch album
- Official language: Korean, English

The G-Dragon Media Exhibition: Übermensch commonly shortened to Übermensch Exhibition is an art exhibition created by South Korean singer-songwriter and artist G-Dragon to accompany his 2025 studio album Übermensch.

== See also ==
- Übermensch World Tour
