= Four of a kind =

Four of a kind may refer to:

- Four of a kind (poker), a type of poker hand
- Four of a Kind (card game), a patience or solitaire

== Film ==
- Four of a Kind (film), an Australian feature film

== Music ==
- 4 of a Kind, the fourth album by American thrash band D.R.I.

== Television ==
=== Episodes ===
- "Four of a Kind", Dead Man's Gun season 2, episode 16 (1999)
- "Four of a Kind", Major Crimes season 4, episode 11 (2015)
- "Four of a Kind", Temperatures Rising season 2, episode 12 (1973)
- "Four of a Kind", Wendy and Me episode 14 (1964)
- "Four of a Kind", Z-Cars series 1, episode 1 (1962)

=== Shows ===
- Four of a Kind (TV series), an American reality series about quadruplets

== See also ==
- One of a Kind (disambiguation)
- Two of a Kind (disambiguation)
- Three of a Kind (disambiguation)
- Five of a kind (disambiguation)
