= Two of a Kind =

Two of a Kind may refer to:

== Film ==
- Two of a Kind (1951 film), starring Edmond O'Brien and Lizabeth Scott
- Two of a Kind (1982 film), starring George Burns and Robbie Benson
- Two of a Kind (1983 film), starring Olivia Newton-John and John Travolta
  - Two of a Kind (soundtrack), the soundtrack of the eponymous film
- Two of a Kind (Qing ren zhi ji), a 1993 Hong Kong film directed by Teddy Chan

== Literature ==
- Two of a Kind, a 1974 novel by Anne Hampson
- Two of a Kind, a 1980 novel by George G. Gilman, the first installment in the Edge Meets Adam Steele series
- Two of a Kind, a 1984 novel by Lori Copeland
- Two of a Kind: The Hillside Stranglers, a 1985 non-fiction book by Darcy O'Brien
- Two of a Kind, a 1988 novel by Rosemary Edghill, the second installment in the Regency Romances series
- Two of a Kind?, a 2005 novel by Greg Cox, the first installment in The APO Series; the 14th overall novel based on the television series Alias
- Two of a Kind, a 2013 novel by Susan Mallery

== Television ==
=== Shows ===
- 2-of-a-Kind, a 1992–95 Cartoon Network programming block
- Two of a Kind (American TV series), a 1998–1999 ABC television series starring Mary-Kate and Ashley Olsen
- Two of a Kind (British TV series), a 1960s ATV television series starring Eric Morecambe & Ernie Wise
- Two of a Kind (Hong Kong TV series), a 1989 Hong Kong television series starring Hacken Lee

=== Episodes ===
- "Two of a Kind", All Creatures Great and Small (1978) series 5, episode 12 (1988)
- "Two of a Kind", Bakugan: Armored Alliance episode 10b (2020)
- "Two of a Kind", Blue Bloods season 14, episode 9 (2024)
- "Two of a Kind", Care Bears: Adventures in Care-a-Lot season 1, episode 13a (2007)
- "Two of a Kind", Champs episode 8 (1996)
- "Two of a Kind", Criminal Minds: Suspect Behavior episode 1 (2011)
- "Two of a Kind", Dusty's Trail episode 9 (1973)
- "Two of a Kind", Gunsmoke season 8, episode 27 (1963)
- "Two of a Kind", Kings Row episode 2 (1955)
- "Two of a Kind", Las Vegas season 2, episode 8 (2004)
- "Two of a Kind", Mrs Thursday series 3, episode 5 (1967)
- "Two of a Kind", Naturally, Sadie season 2, episode 21 (2006)
- "Two of a Kind", Noah's Ark series 1, episode 1 (1997)
- "Two of a Kind", Private Secretary season 2, episode 9 (1953)
- "Two of a Kind", The Adventures of Black Beauty series 1, episode 21 (1973)
- "Two of a Kind", The Batman season 4, episode 10 (2007)
- "Two of a Kind", The Glo Friends episode 12 (1986)
- "Two of a Kind", The Nature of Things season 54, episode 8 (2014)
- "Two of a Kind", The Rogues episode 8 (1964)
- "Two of a Kind", Touch season 2, episode 10 (2013)
- "Two of a Kind", Vegas (2012) episode 15 (2013)
- "Two of a Kind", VeggieTales in the City season 2, episode 5a (2017)
- "Two of a Kind", Water Rats season 5, episode 15 (2000)
- "Two of a Kind", Whirlybirds season 3, episode 15 (1959)
- "Two of a Kind", Whiskey Cavalier episode 12 (2019)
- "Two of a Kind", Yancy Derringer episode 13 (1959)
- "Two of a Kind", Your Lie in April episode 16 (2015)

== Music ==
- Two of a Kind (Bobby Darin and Johnny Mercer album), 1961, or the title track
- Two of a Kind (Porter Wagoner and Dolly Parton album), 1971
- Two of a Kind (Earl Klugh and Bob James album), 1982
- Two of a Kind (Ray Drummond and John Hicks album), 1989
- Two of a Kind (Katie and Maggie Noonan album), 2004
- Two of a Kind: Groovemasters, Vol. 8, a 2002 album by guitarists Pat Donohue and Mike Rowling
- "Two of a Kind", a song by rock band AFI from Answer That and Stay Fashionable
- "Two of a Kind", a song from Syd Barrett's album The Peel Session
- "2 of a Kind", a song by German group Monrose from Temptation
- "2 of a Kind", a song by American singer Vanessa Williams on her album The Comfort Zone

== See also ==
- One of a Kind
- Three of a Kind
- Four of a kind
- Five of a kind
