= Five of a kind =

Five of a kind may refer to:

- Five of a kind (poker), a type of poker hand

== Film and television ==
- Five of a Kind, a 1938 American comedy film

=== Television episodes ===
- "Five of a Kind", Power Rangers in Space episode 34 (1998)
- "Five of a Kind", Roseanne, season 2, episode 6 (1989)

== See also ==
- One of a Kind
- Two of a Kind
- Three of a Kind
- Four of a kind
