= Act III: M.O.T.T.E World Tour =

2017 concert tour by G-Dragon

- Tour by G-Dragon
- Associated album: Kwon Ji Yong
- Start date: June 10, 2017
- End date: October 8, 2017
- No. of shows: 19 in Asia; 8 in North America; 4 in Oceania; 5 in Europe; 36 in total

G-Dragon concert chronology
- One of a Kind World Tour (2013); Act III: M.O.T.T.E World Tour (2017); Übermensch World Tour (2025)

The Act III: M.O.T.T.E 'Moment of Truth The End' World Tour (referred to as Act III: M.O.T.T.E) was the second concert tour by South Korean rapper and singer-songwriter G-Dragon. It was in support of his self-titled EP Kwon Ji Yong (2017). The tour began on June 10, 2017, in Seoul and concluded on October 8, 2017, in Taipei, Taiwan.

Act III represents the beginning of the third decade of his life while 'M.O.T.T.E' (Korean: 모태; Hanja: 母胎; RR: motae) meaning "mother's womb" in Korean, or "from birth", also serves as an acronym for 'Moment Of Truth The End'. The tour is the largest concert tour ever conducted by a Korean solo artist, it was attended by 654,000 people worldwide.

== Background ==
In January 2017, YG Entertainment announced that G-Dragon was working on a new solo album to be released in 2017, along with a new concert tour to support the album. On March 31, it was reported by various media outlets that G-Dragon will perform at Seoul World Cup Stadium on June 10. YG Entertainment confirmed the concert a week later, making G-Dragon the second solo artist in history to perform at Seoul World Cup Stadium, after labelmate PSY. On April 25, it was announced that the tour would visit 18 cities across Asia, North America and Oceania. On June 17, additional dates were announced in Hong Kong, Philippines, Indonesia, Malaysia and Taiwan. On June 26, YG Entertainment added five European cities to the tour, marking the first time for G-Dragon to stage a solo performance in Europe.

The concert at Seoul World Cup Stadium was live-streamed in Japanese cinemas. The final concert in Japan at Tokyo Dome on September 20 was aired live in 100 theaters across Japan.

Renowned designer and director Willo Perron, served as the creative director for the tour, having previously worked with international artists such as Rihanna, Kanye West, and Drake.

== Commercial performance ==
Ticket sales started in South Korea on April 13, and all 40,000 tickets were sold out in 8 minutes, and generated $3.9 million USD in revenue from tickets sales. In Macau, a second show was added after the first sold-out moments after release, selling a combined number of 22,000 tickets. In Hong Kong, G-Dragon broke the record for the highest attendance at AsiaWorld–Arena for a single show, gathering 18,200 concertgoers each night for two consecutive performances. G-Dragon's tour in Japan gathered a combined audience of 260,000 for five concerts, with attendance per concert averaging 52,000 people.

According to Billboard Boxscore, the North American leg attracted nearly 60,000 people. On Pollstar's year end Top 200 North American Tours list for 2017, G-Dragon ranked at number 154 and earned $7.9 million from eight shows, making him the second Korean artist to enter the chart, after his band Big Bang.

== Critical reception ==
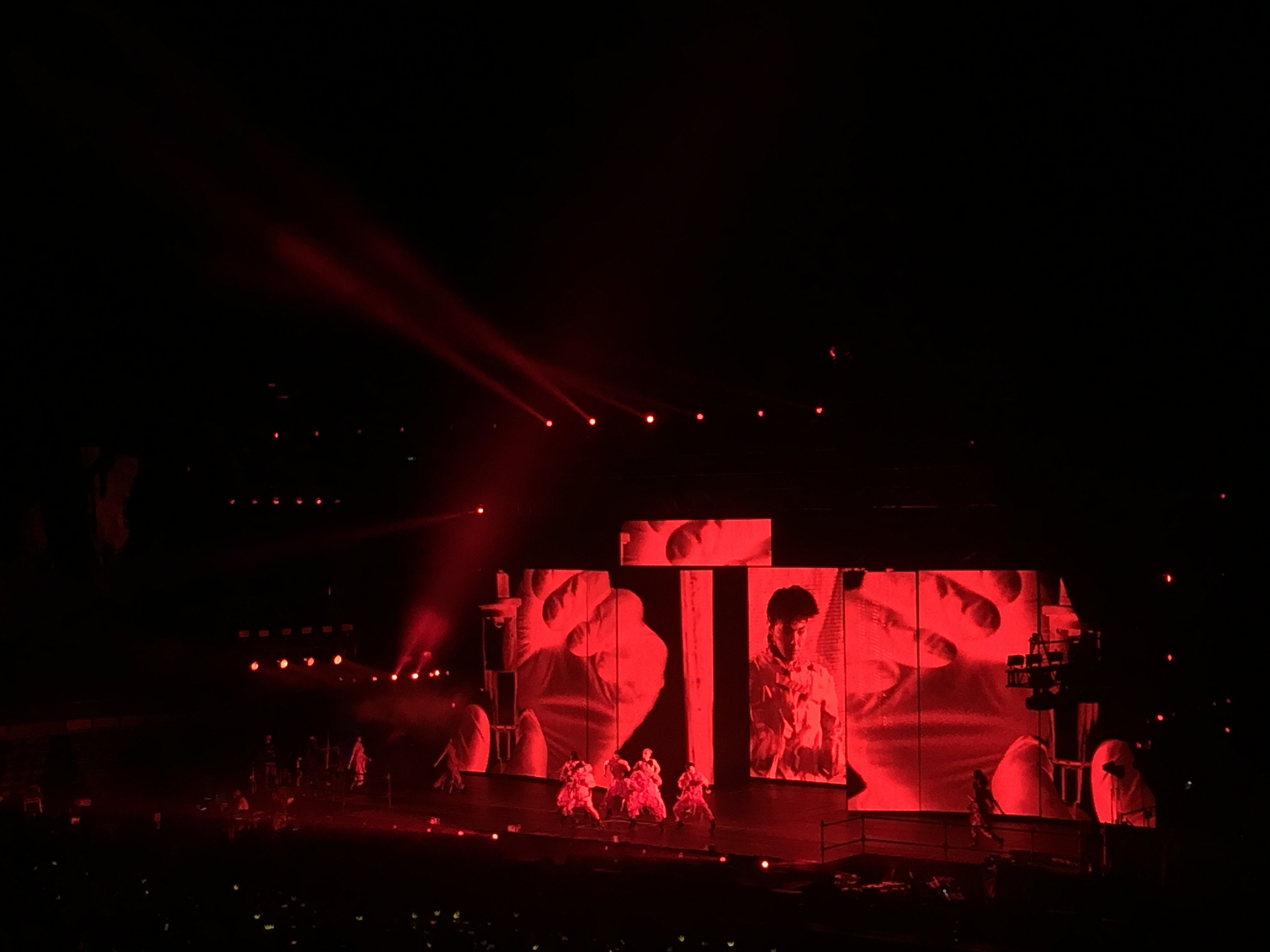
G-Dragon performing "One of a Kind" on his show on Sydney, Australia.

The tour received positive reviews from music critics. Writing about the concert in Macau, Kimberly Lim from The New Paper felt that "idea behind the concert was simple, yet profound." Lim also complimented how G-Dragon "has proven himself to be a multifaceted performer – one who is able to rap lighthearted, energetic songs, and sing emotional, power ballads while dancing."

Riddhi Chakraborty, a reporter from Rolling Stone India described the first part of the concert as an "energetic opening" that starts with "pop-soaked hits from early on in his career, setting up a chronological progression of his repertoire for the rest of the evening", while the second part presents the "creation of a superstar depicted as a painful, surgical process, serving as a commentary on the superficiality of the entertainment industry", with G-Dragon jumping "genres effortlessly" and "wrapping it all up neatly with sharp choreography." About the final part, she wrote that it was "easily the most intimate of the three segments", and concluded that in the concert, the rapper decided "lay it all bare and give his fans the best show possible", making use of "precise choreography, stage direction, seamless costume changes and a plethora of pyrotechnics", but despite its "high production value", the writer felt that his "unwavering enthusiasm, electric stage presence and brutal honesty that indeed make it 'the tour you cannot miss.'"

The website Vulture ranked the concert at the Barclays Center at number three in their "The 10 Best Concerts of 2017" list, complementing how he "performed with presence, aware that he's not just any man, putting on a show in three acts that saw multiple wardrobe changes, sharp choreography, expensive lights and sets onstage, and his usual cheeky oscillations between femme and machismo." Additionally, they praised the way the rapper "broke the fourth wall" and showed the audience that "he's still a work in progress, but he's no longer scared to let his fans watch that transformation."

== Set list ==
This set list is representative of the show on June 17, 2017, in Macau. It is not representative of all concerts for the duration of the tour.

Act I

1. "Heartbreaker"
2. "Breathe"
3. "A Boy"
4. "But I Love U"
5. "Obsession"

Act II

1. "MichiGO"
2. "One of a Kind"
3. "R.O.D"
4. "That XX"
5. "Black"
6. "Missing You"
7. "You Do"
8. "Who You"
9. "I Love It"
10. "Today"
11. "Crayon"

Act III

1. "Super Star"
2. "Middle Fingers Up"
3. "Bullshit"
4. "Divina Commedia"
5. "This Love"
6. "Crooked"
7. "Untitled, 2014"

Notes
- "This Love" was performed for the encore only for the first leg in Asia and in Seattle, USA.

Special guests

- During the first show in Seoul, G-Dragon performed "R.O.D" and "The Leaders" with CL, and "Palette" and "Missing You" with IU.
- During the shows in Manila and Kuala Lumpur, G-Dragon performed "Missing You" and "Hello" with Dara.
- During the second show in Tokyo, G-Dragon and Seungri performed "Crooked", and a medley of Big Bang songs including "Bae Bae", "Bang Bang Bang", "Good Boy", and "Fantastic Baby".
- During the final shows in Taipei, G-Dragon performed "Palette" and "Missing You" with IU.

== Tour dates ==
List of tour dates
| Date | City | Country | Venue | Attendance | Revenue |
|---|---|---|---|---|---|
| June 10, 2017 | Seoul | South Korea | Seoul World Cup Stadium | 40,000 / 40,000 | $3,900,000 |
| June 17, 2017 | Macau | China | Cotai Arena | 22,000 / 22,000 | — |
| June 18, 2017 | Macau | China | Cotai Arena | 22,000 / 22,000 | — |
| June 24, 2017 | Singapore | | Singapore Indoor Stadium | 15,000 / 15,000 | — |
| June 25, 2017 | Singapore | | Singapore Indoor Stadium | 15,000 / 15,000 | — |
| July 7, 2017 | Bangkok | Thailand | Impact Arena | 20,000 / 20,000 | — |
| July 8, 2017 | Bangkok | Thailand | Impact Arena | 20,000 / 20,000 | — |
| July 11, 2017 | Seattle | United States | KeyArena | 6,246 / 8,610 | $809,157 |
| July 14, 2017 | San Jose | United States | SAP Center | 9,031 / 11,441 | $1,161,815 |
| July 16, 2017 | Inglewood | United States | The Forum | 9,928 / 10,957 | $1,354,697 |
| July 19, 2017 | Houston | United States | Toyota Center | 5,708 / 7,796 | $789,233 |
| July 21, 2017 | Chicago | United States | United Center | 7,035 / 10,688 | $944,143 |
| July 25, 2017 | Miami | United States | American Airlines Arena | 4,481 / 12,129 | $562,097 |
| July 27, 2017 | Brooklyn | United States | Barclays Center | 7,920 / 9,861 | $1,380,349 |
| July 30, 2017 | Toronto | Canada | Air Canada Centre | 9,525 / 9,525 | $1,078,640 |
| August 5, 2017 | Sydney | Australia | Qudos Bank Arena | — | — |
| August 8, 2017 | Brisbane | Australia | Brisbane Entertainment Centre | 2,103 / 2,351 | $401,154 |
| August 12, 2017 | Melbourne | Australia | Hisense Arena | — | — |
| August 16, 2017 | Auckland | New Zealand | Spark Arena | — | — |
| August 19, 2017 | Fukuoka | Japan | Fukuoka Dome | 260,000 / 260,000 (Note: The score data is combined from the shows held in Japan from 19, 22, August 23 & 19, September 20, 2017, respectively.) | — |
| August 22, 2017 | Osaka | Japan | Kyocera Dome | 260,000 / 260,000 | — |
| August 23, 2017 | Osaka | Japan | Kyocera Dome | 260,000 / 260,000 | — |
| August 25, 2017 | Hong Kong | China | AsiaWorld–Arena | 36,000 / 36,000 | — |
| August 26, 2017 | Hong Kong | China | AsiaWorld–Arena | 36,000 / 36,000 | — |
| September 1, 2017 | Quezon City | Philippines | Smart Araneta Coliseum | — | — |
| September 3, 2017 | Jakarta | Indonesia | Indonesia Convention Exhibition | — | — |
| September 17, 2017 | Kuala Lumpur | Malaysia | Stadium Merdeka | 12,000 / 12,000 | — |
| September 19, 2017 | Tokyo | Japan | Tokyo Dome | | — |
| September 20, 2017 | Tokyo | Japan | Tokyo Dome | | — |
| September 23, 2017 | Birmingham | England | Genting Arena | — | — |
| September 24, 2017 | London | England | The SSE Arena, Wembley | — | — |
| September 26, 2017 | Amsterdam | Netherlands | Ziggo Dome | — | — |
| September 28, 2017 | Paris | France | AccorHotels Arena | — | — |
| September 30, 2017 | Berlin | Germany | Mercedes-Benz Arena | 9,161 / 12,322 | $1,279,070 |
| October 7, 2017 | Taipei | Taiwan | Nangang Exhibition Center | 22,000 / 22,000 | $2,670,220 |
| October 8, 2017 | Taipei | Taiwan | Nangang Exhibition Center | 22,000 / 22,000 | $2,670,220 |
| Total | | | | 654,000 | N/A |

== Personnel ==
Credits adapted from the video credits shown at the end of the show.

Band

- Gil Smith II – Music director/keyboard
- Toure Harris – Pro Tools
- Omar Dominick – Bass
- Bennie Rodgers II – Drums
- Justin Lyons – Guitar

Dancers

- Hi-Tec
  - Park Jung Heon
  - Kim Byung Gon
  - Kwon Young Deuk
  - Kwon Young Don
  - Lee Young Sang
  - You Chung Jae
- Crazy
  - Won Ah Yeon
  - Park Eun Young
  - Kim Min Jung
  - Kim Hee Yeon
  - Park Eun Chong
  - Mai Murakawa

Concert

- Lee Jae Wook – Choreographer
- Jeong Chi Young - Executive Director
- Lee Rachel - Concert Director
- Gee Eun – Visual director/stylist

Personal services

- Choi Hong Il – Manager
- Lee Tae Hee – Manager
- Kim Tae Hyun – Hair stylist
- Lim Hea Kyung – Make-up stylist
- Kim Yun Kyoung – Make-up stylist
- Shin Mi Sug – Make-up stylist
- Hwangssabu – Personal trainer
- Lee Ji Hyun – Personal trainer
- Choi Jae Ho – Security
- Yang Soon Chul – Security
