= G-Dragon =

South Korean rapper (born 1988)

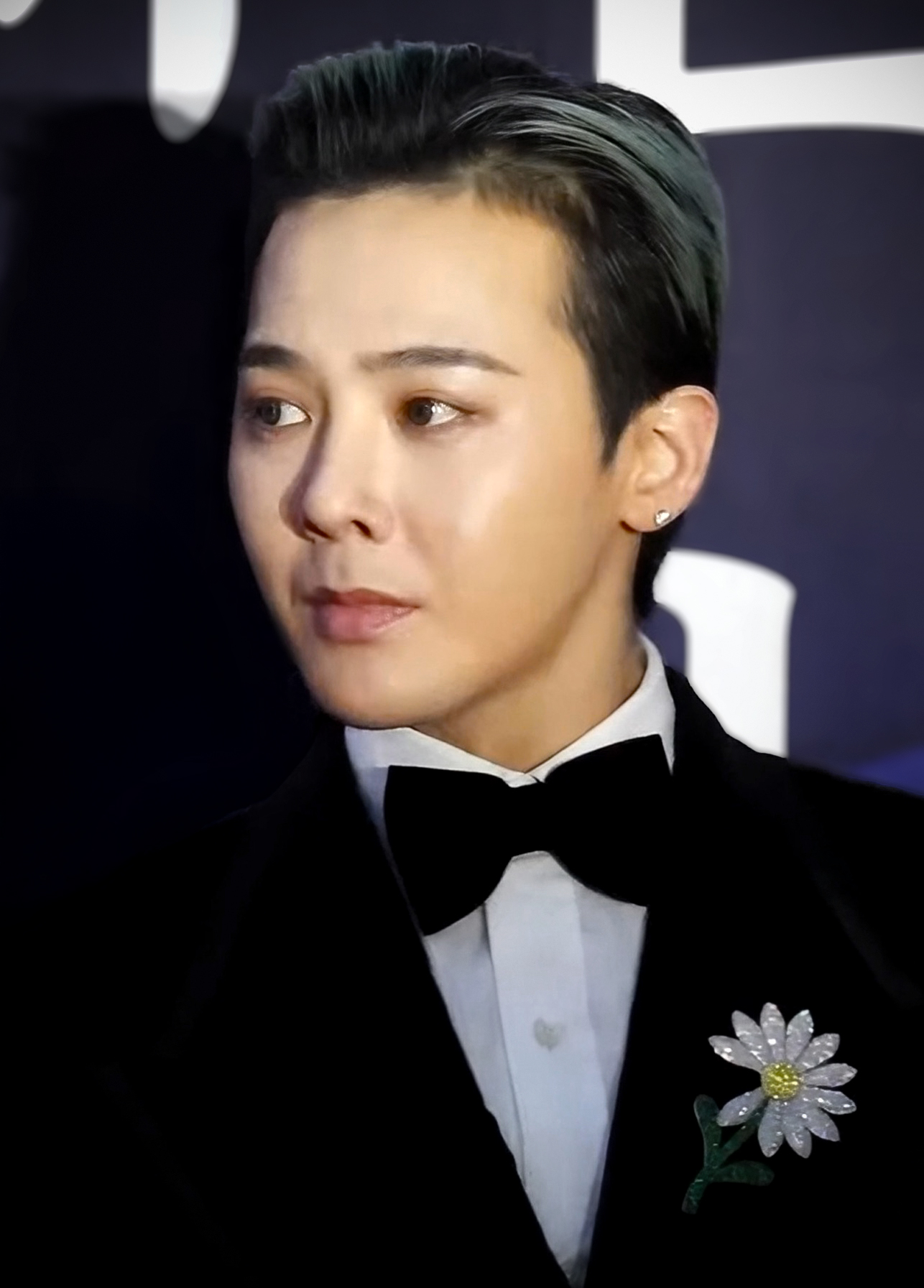
- G-Dragon attending the Korean Popular Culture and Arts Awards in October 2025
- Born: Kwon Ji-yong; August 18, 1988 (age 38); Seoul, South Korea
- Other name: GD
- Education: Sejong University (MA)
- Occupations: Rapper; singer; songwriter; record producer; entrepreneur; fashion designer; professor
- Years active: 1994–present
- Honours: Okgwan Order of Cultural Merit (2025)
- Musical career
- Genres: K-pop; hip-hop; dance-pop; R&B; trap
- Instruments: Vocals
- Labels: YG; Galaxy Corp.; Empire
- Member of: BigBang; GD X Taeyang
- Formerly of: Little Roo'Ra; YG Family; GD & TOP

Korean name
- Hangul: 권지용
- RR: Gwon Jiyong
- MR: Kwŏn Chiyong

Kwon Ji-yong (Korean: 권지용; born August 18, 1988), best known as G-Dragon (지드래곤), is a South Korean rapper, singer, songwriter, and entrepreneur. Dubbed the "King of K-pop", (Note: Attributed to multiple sources:) he rose to prominence as the leader of the South Korean boy band BigBang, which went on to become one of the best-selling boy bands in the world.

Born in Seoul, he made his public debut at age six as part of the musical group Little Roo'ra. In 2009, he released his first solo studio album Heartbreaker; the album and its title track of the same name were commercially successful, becoming the best-selling album by a Korean soloist at the time and earning him Album of the Year at the 2009 Mnet Asian Music Awards. This was followed by a collaboration with bandmate T.O.P for the album GD & TOP in 2010. His first EP, One of a Kind (2012), earned Best Album at the 2013 Seoul Music Awards and spawned the chart-topping single "That XX". In 2013, he embarked on the One of a Kind World Tour, his first worldwide tour as a solo artist, making him the first Korean soloist to tour Japanese dome arenas.

G-Dragon released his second studio album Coup d'Etat in 2013, featuring the number-one single "Who You?". His 2017 EP, Kwon Ji Yong, yielded the chart-topping single "Untitled, 2014", and the supporting concert tour Act III: M.O.T.T.E became the largest tour ever conducted by a Korean soloist. In 2023, G-Dragon officially departed YG Entertainment after 20 years of activities, signing to Galaxy Corporation under his real name. His third studio album Übermensch (2025) earned Album of the Year at the 2025 Melon Music Awards and spawned the number-one singles "Home Sweet Home" and "Too Bad"; the former song earned Song of the Year at the same ceremony.

Widely recognized for his influence on youth culture, fashion trends, and music in South Korea, G-Dragon was included in Forbes' list of the 2030 Power Leaders for three consecutive years (2012–2014), and has been part of Hypebeast's list of the 100 most influential people in fashion eight times. He has written or co-written 24 number-one songs on the Gaon Digital Chart, most of which he has also co-produced. G-Dragon is the recipient of numerous awards, including twelve MAMA Awards, fourteen Melon Music Awards, two Korean Music Awards and two Golden Disc Awards, and the first and only solo artist to receive the MAMA Award for Artist of the Year (2013 and 2025).

== Early life and education ==
G-Dragon was born on August 18, 1988, in Seoul, South Korea. He enrolled at Kyung Hee University in 2008 to study post-modern music; he later dropped out due to his busy schedule, and instead majored in Sports Technology Management at Gukje Cyber University, obtaining a Bachelor's degree in 2013. G-Dragon graduated in 2016 double majoring Master's degree in Supply Chain Management and Fashion Merchandising at Sejong University. Plans for a doctoral degree were delayed to accommodate his military enlistment.

== Career ==
=== 1994–2008: Career beginnings ===
G-Dragon began his career at age six as part of the group Little Roo'ra. Following the release of the group's Christmas album, the group's contract was terminated by their record company, which shocked G-Dragon. Although he vowed to his mother that, he "wouldn't [try to become a singer] again", he was scouted by SM Entertainment on a ski trip with his family. He was a trainee under the record label SM Entertainment for five years (from 8–13 years old), specializing in dance before he left.

During third grade, a friend introduced G-Dragon to the American rap group Wu-Tang Clan. Having been influenced by their music, he developed interest in rapping and began taking classes. After attending a summer school hosted by the South Korean hiphop group People Crew which he joined after begging his mom, he was introduced to Lee Hee-sung, who was member of another South Korean hip hop group X-teen, who tried to make G-Dragon into Korea's Bow Wow. Under People Crew's tutelage, he participated in the release of the Korean hip-hop album Korean hiphop Flex (대한민국 힙합플렉스 2001) in 2001, becoming the youngest Korean rapper at 13 years old. Although he wrote his own lyrics, he admitted that his English was weak and the story behind the lyrics was just another typical "I'm young, but I'm the best" story. Additionally, he and future fellow BigBang member Choi Seung-hyun were "neighborhood friend[s] from middle school" and would often dance and rap together before G-Dragon moved away. Catching the interest of Sean of the hip-hop duo Jinusean from YG Entertainment, he recommended G-Dragon to Sean's record label's CEO Yang Hyun Suk. After signing a contract with the record label, G-Dragon spent the first year cleaning the studio for the other artists in the record label and fetching water bottles during dance practice.

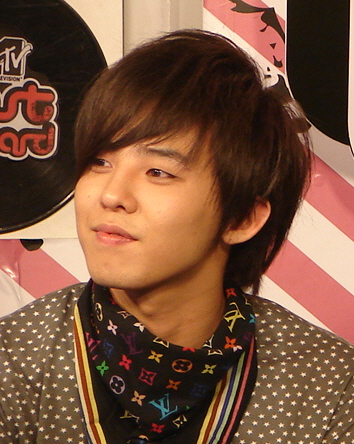
G-Dragon at MTV Fast Forward, Thailand, 2007

He chose the stage name G-Dragon ("Ji" is pronounced like "G", and Yong is Korean for "dragon"). He featured on other artists' albums and released several singles with Dong Young-Bae (Taeyang) under the name "GDYB". After YG, Entertainment scrapped the plan and opted for a boy band instead, G-Dragon contacted Choi, who auditioned in. G-Dragon, Taeyang, and Choi (who chose the stage name T.O.P), were paired with three other members (Jang Hyun-seung, Daesung, and Seungri).

The formation of the group was documented on television, but prior to their official debut, Jang was dropped. The now-quintet's debut was a moderate success, with their first album selling over 100,000 copies, and included G-Dragon's first solo recording, a cover of the American alternative rock group Maroon 5's single "This Love". The release of the EP Always in 2007 was a musical departure from their previous materials and saw G-Dragon's increased involvement in its production. Several songs were composed by him, including the lead-single "Lies", which became the group's first number one hit. Their following EPs followed its predecessor's footsteps: Hot Issue yielded "Last Farewell" while Stand Up spawned "Haru Haru"; both singles, composed by him, were chart-toppers. Having produced the majority of BigBang's materials, G-Dragon was also involved with the production of Taeyang's debut extended play Hot (2008).

=== 2009–2011: Solo debut and commercial popularity ===
"Heartbreaker" (2009)
His first official solo single, "Heartbreaker" drew controversy over similarities to the song "Right Round" by Flo Rida

In 2009, G-Dragon was featured on singer Lexy's song "Super Fly" for her album Rush alongside Taeyang and T.O.P. He later collaborated with the Japanese boy band W-inds. for their single, "Rain Is Fallin'/Hybrid Dream". His first solo album, Heartbreaker, was released in August of that year. Featuring collaborations with several artists, including Teddy of 1TYM, Taeyang, Kush, CL and Sandara Park of 2NE1, and propelled by its lead-single of the same name, the album surpassed 300,000 copies sold, and went on to win Album of the Year at the 2009 Mnet Asian Music Awards. Shortly after Heartbreaker's release, G-Dragon was accused of plagiarism by Sony Music when his tracks "Heartbreaker" and "Butterfly" were alleged to be similar to Flo Rida's "Right Round" and Oasis's "She's Electric", respectively. However, EMI, the record label that distributed "Right Round" said that they saw no similarities between these two songs.

On March 6, 2010, YG Entertainment announced that they personally contacted Flo Rida's representatives requesting that he feature in G-Dragon's live album, Shine a Light, to which Flo Rida accepted. In support of his album, G-Dragon staged his first solo concert at Olympic Gymnastics Arena in December 2009. The name of the concert, Shine a Light, was derived from the lyrics to his song "A Boy". The concert subsequently sparked controversy following complaints of obscenity and suggestive content. The Korean Ministry of Health, Welfare and Family Affairs later asked the government prosecutors to investigate if G-Dragon or YG Entertainment violated laws on obscene performances in his concert. He was found innocent and was cleared of all charges on March 15, 2010.

In November 2010, G-Dragon and T.O.P released their collaboration album GD & TOP. Preceding the release of the album, the duo held a worldwide premiere showcase for their album at Times Square in Yeongdeungpo, Seoul, which was also broadcast live on YouTube. To promote their album, the duo released three singles: "High High", "Oh Yeah", and "Knock Out" (Korean: 뻑이가요; RR: Ppeogigayo). All three singles preceded the release of the album and achieved commercial success: "High High" scored number one on several music programs while "Oh Yeah" peaked at number two on the Gaon Digital Chart. The album was released on Christmas Eve, and debuted at number one on the Gaon Album Chart with pre-orders of 200,000 copies.

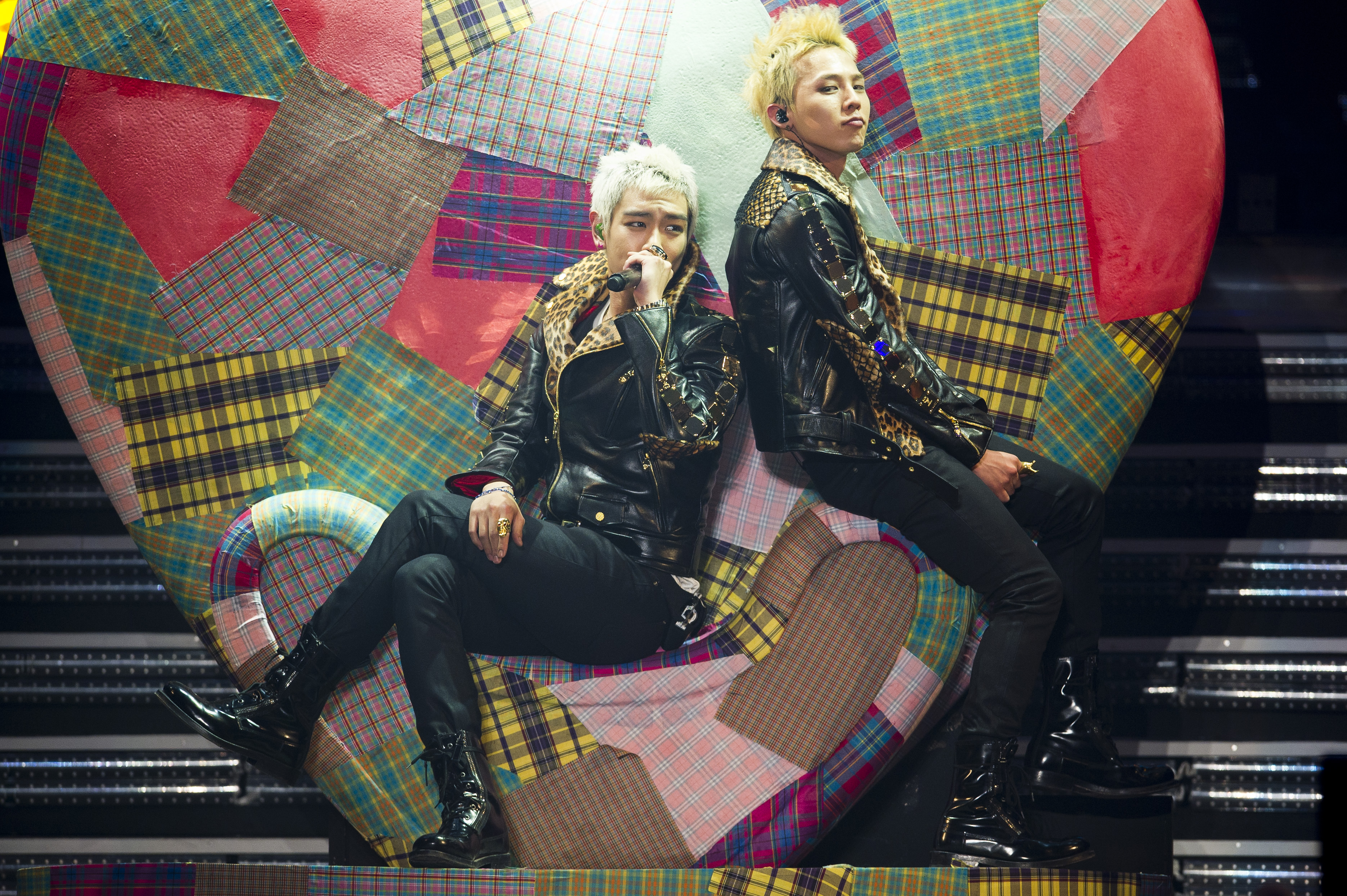
G-Dragon performing with T.O.P. in 2011

G-Dragon also formed a duo with Park Myung Soo for the Infinite Challenge Seohae Ahn Highway Song Festival 2011. They released their song "Having an Affair" featuring Park Bom from 2NE1 on June 2, 2011. The song later became the second most downloaded song on the Gaon Music Chart for the year 2011.

=== 2012–2013: Breakthrough years and comeback with Big Bang ===
While working on new solo materials, G-Dragon made an appearance in the Japanese version of Pixie Lott's album Young Foolish Happy, along with T.O.P. His first extended play One of a Kind was released on September 15, 2012, drawing positive reviews, placing first on the Billboard World Album Chart and entering the Billboard 200 Chart at 161. Three singles were released to support the album: the top-five hit "One of a Kind", which earned him the Best Hip Hop and Rap Song of the Year awards from the Korean Music Awards and the Rhythmer Awards respectively; the number one "That XX" and the top-three hit "Crayon" that was ranked by Spin Magazine as the best K-Pop single of the year. The album sold over 200,000 copies, making it the highest selling solo album in Korea since the release of his debut album Heartbreaker in 2009. He won "Best Male Solo Artist" at the 14th Mnet Asian Music Awards and "Record of the Year" for One of a Kind at the 22nd Seoul Music Awards. G-Dragon also embarked on the One of a Kind World Tour in 2013, becoming the first Korean solo artist to hold a four-dome tour in Japan and the second Korean solo artist to have a world tour (the first being Rain). The production of the tour cost $3.5 million, making it the largest scale in Korean history at the time. The tour was held in 8 countries, visited 13 cities for a total of 27 concerts gathering 570,000 fans.

In August 2013, G-Dragon performed "Shake The World" as an intro to "One Of A Kind", "Feat. Missy Elliott" (Missy Elliott Ver.) and "Crayon" at the KCON 2013 concert in Los Angeles.

After touring extensively, G-Dragon went back into the studio to record his second studio album. YG Entertainment later announced that Grammy Award-winning musician Missy Elliott will be featured on the album. Coup d'Etat (2013) was released in two parts online, with the full album released physically on September 13, featuring collaborations with Diplo, Baauer, Boys Noize, Sky Ferreira, Siriusmo, Zion.T, Lydia Paek, and label-mate Jennie Kim. G-Dragon and Missy Elliott performed the song "Niliria" at the KCON 2013 in Los Angeles. Six tracks from Coup d'Etat placed within the top 10 of the Gaon Digital Chart, including the number one "Who You?". The best-performing single of the album was "Crooked", with over 1.8 million digital downloads, which was his first solo music video to surpass 100 million views on YouTube. The title track "Coup d'Etat" was chosen by Billboard as one of the game-changing EDM tracks of 2013. The album entered the Billboard 200, making G-Dragon the first Korean act to have multiples entries on the chart. The success of Coup d'Etat led to G-Dragon winning a total of four awards at the 15th Mnet Asian Music Awards: Best Male Solo Artist, Best Music Video for "Coup d'Etat", Best Dance Performance for "Crooked", and the highest award, Artist of The Year; he became the first and only solo artist to win the latter. He later took home the World's Best Entertainer and World's Best Album at the World Music Awards.

G-Dragon participated in the Infinite Challenge music festival again for the second time on October 17, 2013, in Imjingak, composing and performing the song "Going to Try" with comedian Jeong Hyeong-don.

=== 2014–2016: New albums and rising success ===
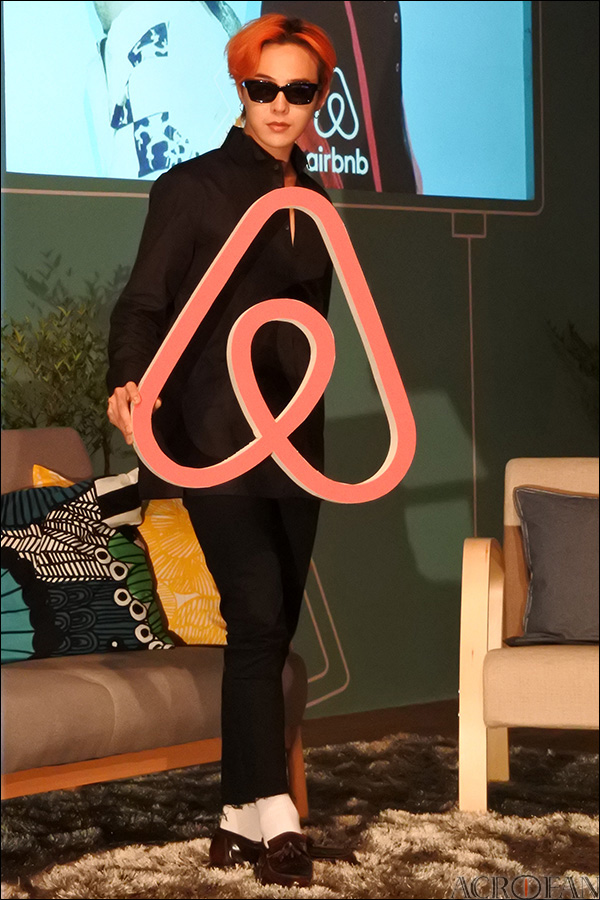
G-Dragon became a face of Airbnb for Asia in 2015

In 2014, G-Dragon wrote and produced for other YG artists. He wrote the track "Good to You" from 2NE1's album Crush. He also worked on Taeyang's second album Rise, writing and producing the lead single "Ringa Linga" and "Stay With Me", and was a featured artist on the latter track. In November 2014, G-Dragon and Taeyang formed a duo to release the single "Good Boy", which debuted at No. 1 on Billboard's World Digital Songs chart, the third time a Korean act topped the chart after PSY and 2NE1. The single had over 1.2 million downloads in South Korea, while its music video surpassed 100 million views on YouTube; this made BigBang the first Korean male group to have three videos with this many YouTube views. In December of the same year, G-Dragon collaborated with Skrillex and Diplo for the song "Dirty Vibe", which features labelmate CL. The single charted at No. 15 on Billboard's Hot Dance/Electronic Songs and No. 21 on Dance/Electronic Digital Songs, making them the first Korean artists to land on the chart. In 2015, he wrote and produced a song for Welcome Back, the debut album of YG's new rookie group iKon.

G-Dragon spent the majority of 2015 and 2016 touring with his band for their third Korean album, performing for over 3.6 million fans in two years. In 2015, he participated in the Infinite Challenge music festival for the third consecutive time, and for the first time with bandmate Taeyang. The duo teamed up with ZE:A's Hwang Kwanghee and released the single "Mapsosa", which peaked at No. 2 on the Gaon Digital Chart, and sold 1.1 million copies by the end of the year, making it one of the best-selling songs of 2015. He appeared on the same show again the following year, for the Muhan Company special, in which he acted for the first time. Additionally, he featured alongside British rapper M.I.A. in Baauer's song "Temple" from his debut album Aa. The song charted at No. 36 on Billboard's Dance/Electronic Digital Songs and No. 26 on Hot Dance/Electronic Songs, making him the first Korean male artist to chart twice on both charts.

=== 2017–2018: Kwon Ji Yong, record-breaking tour, and military service ===
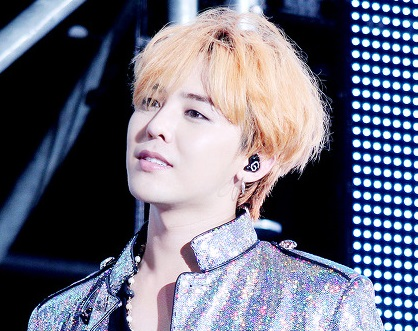
G-Dragon appearing on Infinite Challenge in 2015

On February 1, 2017, G-Dragon featured on Zion.T's song "Complex" which peaked at number two on the Gaon Digital Chart. He also served as a guest rapper for IU's lead single "Palette", off her album of the same name which topped the Gaon Chart for two consecutive weeks. After the promotional activities with his band wrapped up, G-Dragon began preparing for the release of his new album, along with a solo concert tour.

The single "Bullshit" was set to serve as the lead single to precede the release of his second self-titled EP. Due to bandmate T.O.P's marijuana scandal, and the single's provocative name, "Untitled, 2014" was released to radio instead to avoid further controversy for the artist's record label. Forgoing the traditional method of releasing music on CDs, Kwon Ji Yong was released in USB flash drive format on June 8, drawing criticism from Gaon, which refused to regard it as an official album. Gaon reversed its decision later that year, acknowledging the unconventional format as legitimate. The release saw him topping iTunes charts in 46 countries, the most by any Korean album, including the US iTunes chart. Kwon Ji Yong also topped the iTunes worldwide album and European iTunes charts making him the first Korean soloist to do so. In the United States, Kwon Ji Yong became his best-selling album in just one day and his third entry on the Billboard 200 and first number one on the Heatseeksers Albums. Additionally, the EP became his third chart-topper and the first by a Korean soloist to spend multiple weeks atop the Billboard World Albums. In China, the album surpassed 760,000 digital units sold in a day on QQ Music, the biggest music site in the country. Six days after its release, it surpassed one million copies sold, becoming the fastest album to do so and the best-selling album of the year so far. His second world tour, Act III: M.O.T.T.E, began at Seoul World Cup Stadium on June 10, 2017 and visited 29 cities across Asia, North America, Europe and Oceania. The tour is the largest tour by a Korean artist in the United States and Europe, and is the largest concert tour ever conducted by a Korean solo artist, it was attended by 654,000 people worldwide. A behind-the-scenes documentary look at the tour was released by YouTube Premium in September 2018.

G-Dragon began his two-year mandatory military service on February 27, 2018, by entering the 3rd Infantry Division's boot camp in Gangwon province as an active duty soldier, where he was set to be discharged on October 26, 2019, after completing the requirements.

=== 2020–present: Return from military and departure from YG Entertainment ===
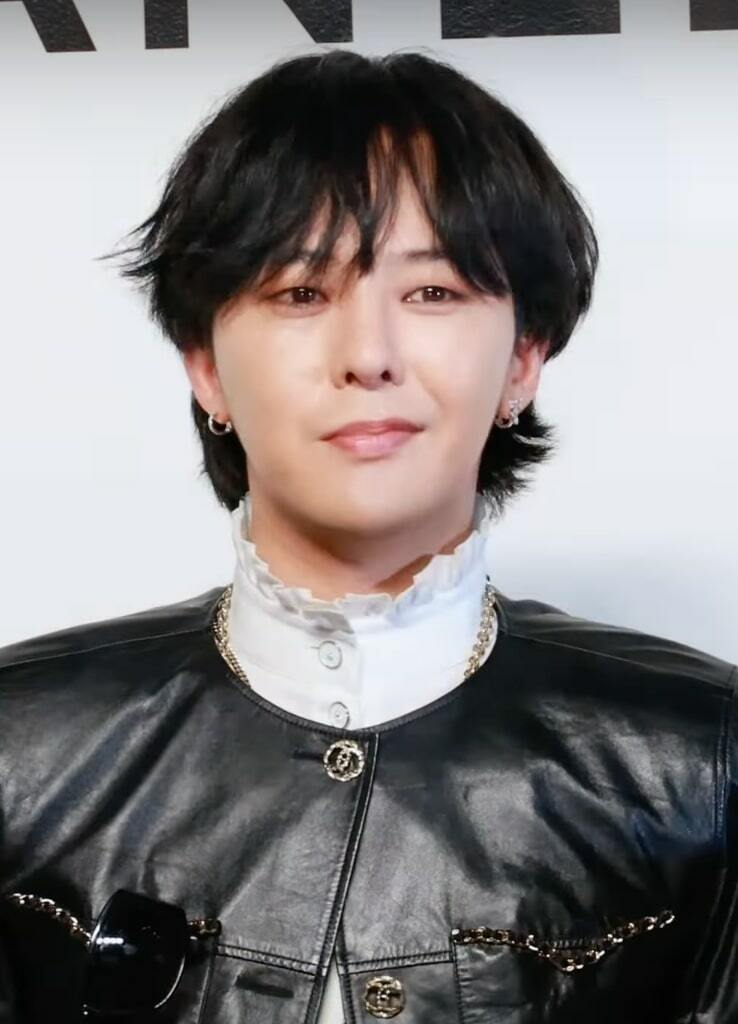
G-Dragon attending a Chanel event in 2023

After a four-year hiatus, G-Dragon made a comeback as part of BigBang with the song "Still Life" on April 4, 2022.

On January 1, 2023, G-Dragon announced he would be preparing a comeback album. In June of that year, YG commented that G-Dragon's contract had expired, though would be collaborating with him for activities such as advertising while discussing his renewal further. On December 20, it was announced that G-Dragon had officially left YG Entertainment. On the same day, Galaxy Corporation officially announced they had officially signed G-Dragon, with plans for him to make a comeback in 2024.

On the October 30 episode of You Quiz on the Block, G-Dragon introduced his first new song since 2017, a pre-release single titled "Power". It was officially released on October 31, alongside the announcement that G-Dragon had signed a deal to release music with Empire Distribution. Another new song, "Home Sweet Home" featuring Big Bang members Taeyang and Daesung, was released on November 22. The trio performed the song the next day at the 2024 MAMA Awards, along with "Power", "Untitled, 2014", "Fantastic Baby", and "Bang Bang Bang". "Home Sweet Home" reached number one on the Circle Digital Chart in South Korea, becoming his sixth number-one single. G-Dragon made further appearances at the 2024 SBS Gayo Daejeon on December 25 and at Le Gala Des Pieces Jaunes in Paris on January 23, 2025, alongside Taeyang.

On February 4, 2025, it was confirmed that G-Dragon's third studio album, titled Übermensch, would be released on February 25. Heralded as G-Dragon's inaugural solo entertainment show, the rapper collaborated with Kim Tae-ho, the renowned producer of Infinite Challenge (2005–2018), to create the music variety program, Good Day. It premiered on February 16, 2025, on MBC and Disney+.

== Artistry ==
=== Music ===
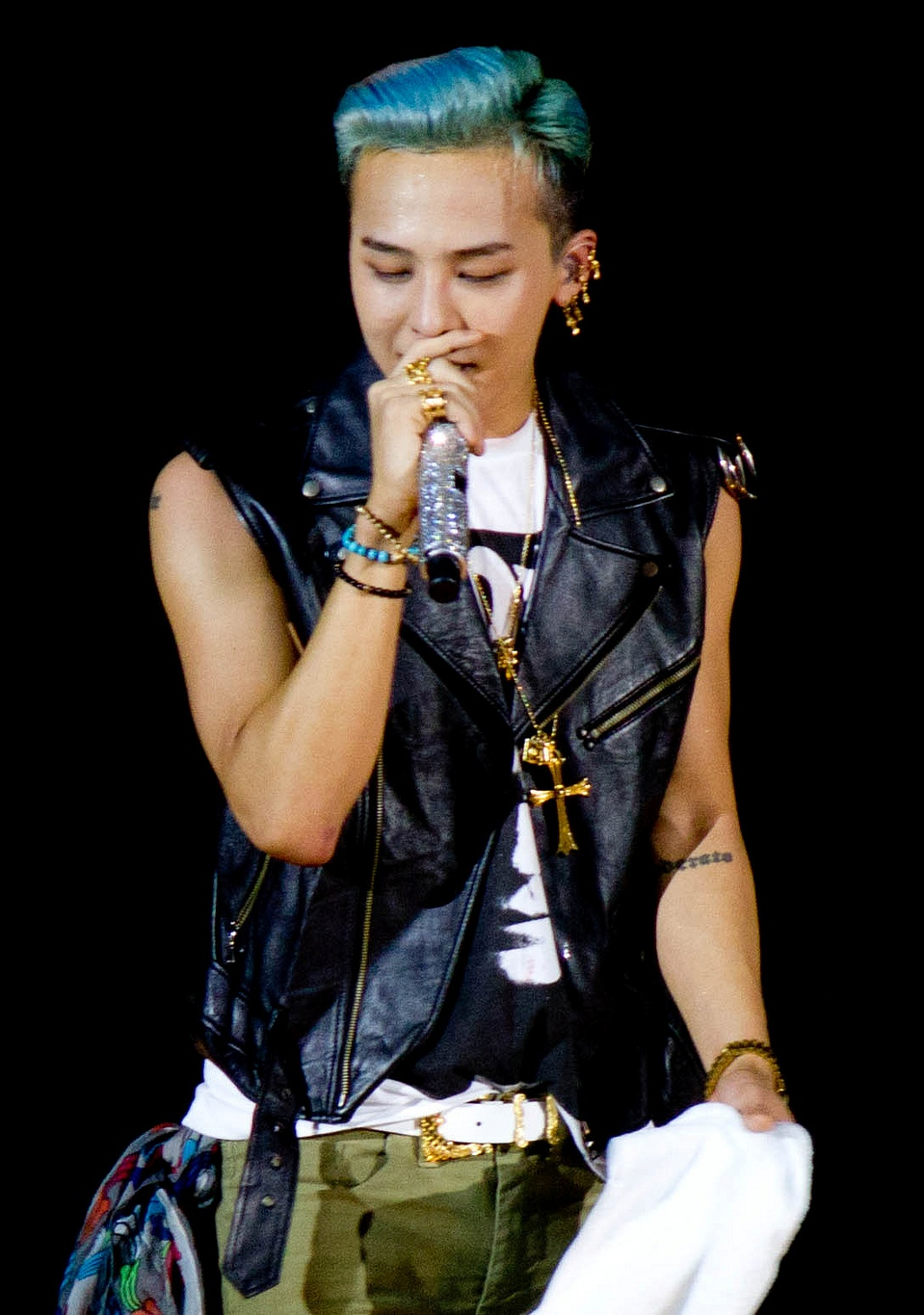
G-Dragon in September 2012

Inspired by the music of Wu-Tang Clan and citing American rapper and singer Pharrell Williams as his "musical hero", G-Dragon's production discography is predominately hip hop. He has also listed Jinusean, Fabolous and Kanye West as influences. At the age of 12, he participated in the annual hip hop Flex album in an attempt jumpstart his career as a hip hop artist. When BigBang debuted, G-Dragon produced mainly hip hop songs for their albums before the quintet branched out and experimented with electronic music, setting it as the new music trend in Korea. While the band continues to incorporate a diverse range of genre into their materials, G-Dragon focuses mainly on hip hop for his solo efforts and the two sub-units he is a part of (GD & TOP, GD X Taeyang) to contrast BigBang's sound.

His first album Heartbreaker was a mix of dance, hip-hop, and R&B while acoustic, hip hop and electronic music influenced GD & TOP. The song "Crayon" from the EP One of a Kind is a mix between hip-hop and electronic music whereas "One of a Kind" is hip hop and pop-rap song. G-Dragon's second album, Coup d'Etat, is noted for being an eclectic mix of hip-hop, dubstep, rock, electro, and pop, with Jessica Oak from Billboard magazine describing the album's title track, which was co-produced by American DJs Diplo and Baauer, as a slow tempo trap influenced song. The song samples Gil Scott-Heron's "The Revolution Will Not Be Televised". "Crooked" was described as a "synthed-up, deliriously catchy pop-punk" with a "neon-bright" sound, fusing "heavy drumbeats and metal guitar riffs" and featuring a "heavy bass line and fully amplified sound at the chorus". In the track, G-Dragon also mixes rap with singing. "Niliria" was noted for sounding ethnic and surrealist.

Kwon Ji Yong continues to feature songs under the hip-hop and R&B genre, with the exception of its lead single, "Untitled, 2014", which is a ballad. Despite primarily being a rapper, the latter also has G-Dragon only singing over a "single piano accompaniment", with Jeff Benjamin of Fuse comparing the song to Adele's "Someone like You" for its simplicity. The intro, "Middle Fingers-Up", features a piano riff with an underlying trap beat. Act I. or "Bullshit" is a multi-layered hip-hop track characterized by a pulsating chorus and sudden beat and rhythm changes. Act II. or "Super Star" is a slow jam fused with trap, filled with brassy drums, Middle-Eastern horns, lilting synths, and a backing chorus. The outro, "Divina Commedia", is an experimental alt-R&B track which samples "Veridis Quo" from Daft Punk's 2001 album Discovery.

=== Lyrics and themes ===
G-Dragon writes the majority of his lyrics, explaining that "each feeling [in creating the music] is different", using his emotions to direct the lyrical content and the composition of his songs. Preferring to pen lyrics that "sound like an actual story", G-Dragon has said he injects throughout his songwriting process "a sense of eeriness" writing songs that resemble horror films, like "She's Gone", "Window" and "That XX". Spin magazine wrote that G-Dragon's music is "daring by K-pop standards, wildly innovative by any standard" and that the rapper seems "unafraid of constantly pushing forward".

"I have this disease-like need to try to create something new. When you're kind of being chased, and everything you do goes so well, you develop this sickness and a sense of need to constantly do something different."
— G-Dragon

The Guardian noted that his songs stand out for "more in-depth themes including self-destruction and narcissism". The lyrics in his song "A Boy" were in response to the negative criticisms surrounding his 2009 plagiarism controversy, with the artist refusing to give up on his career despite the setbacks. "Crooked" was created to express his natural punk attitude by describing a man "full of angst and despair" that demands to be left alone as he spends the night "like a 'crooked-minded person,' because in the end, he's alone and doesn't need anyone's 'sugarcoated sympathy.'" His use of explicit language in "That XX" drew controversy, and the song was deemed unsuitable for listeners below 19 years of age. Discussing "cheeky" themes such as money and fame, "One of a Kind" from the EP of the same name is often viewed as one of his best works, with Ize magazine listing it as one of the most memorable songs written by G-Dragon, commenting that it raised his status as a hip-hop musician. "Middle Fingers Up" from Kwon Ji-Yong discusses the diminishing number of his personal relationships and his ever-decreasing social circle while "Bullshit"'s lyrics are self-referential, referencing "Crayon" by name while the canine onomatopoeia recalls the title track of his last album Coup d'Etat. He takes on a more remorseful approach in "Untitled, 2014", with the rapper apologizing for "his past actions, asking for forgiveness and the chance to see his ex again even if it's just one more time or in his dreams" in what has been described as "a letter to a past lover"

He also explored other themes as a producer for BigBang: "If You" was inspired during a time when the artist was in love, "Bae Bae" was inspired by the work of British artist Francis Bacon and the eroticism in his paintings, while "Loser" was written in an attempt to humanize the group. To distinguish himself from other artists and composers, G-Dragon admits to "giving twist and turn at every corner and evoking [a] different story" with each part of his music, acknowledging that although the chorus is the catchiest part of the song, he wants all the parts to his song to be remembered. Aside from producing songs for his own band, G-Dragon has also produced for other artists, including bandmates Taeyang, Seungri and Daesung solo careers, and YG Entertainment label-mates iKon and 2NE1. He is often described as a "perfectionist" who's very critical during recording sessions.

=== Stage and alter ego ===
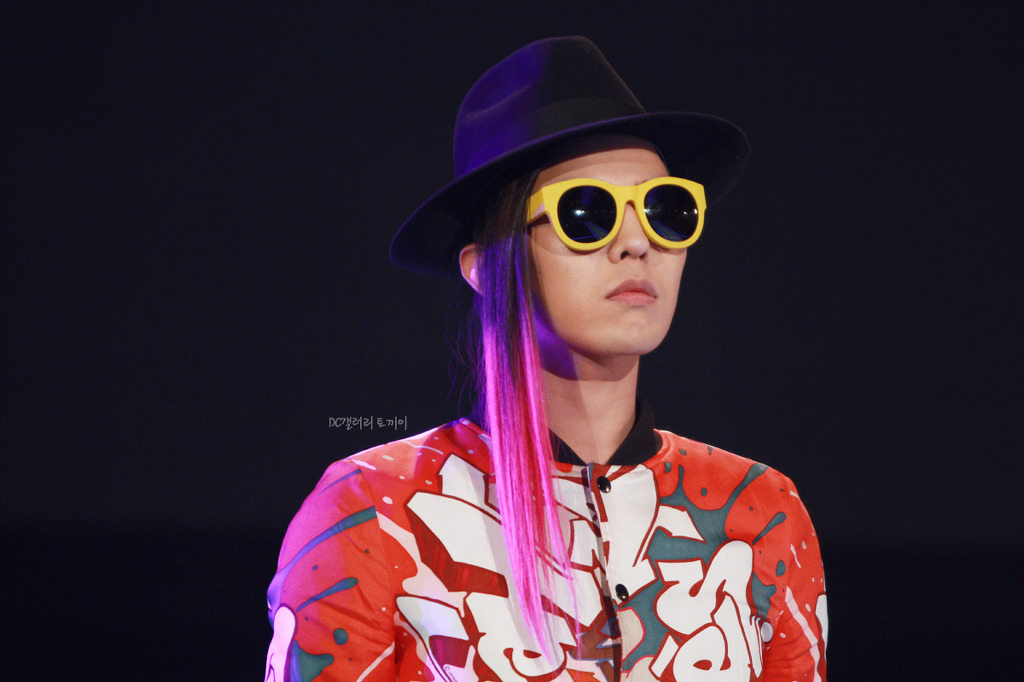
G-Dragon in stage outfit on Big Bang's Alive Tour in 2012

G-Dragon's stage presence and performances have been well received. In a review for his One of a Kind World Tour, Billboard claimed that G-Dragon was a "highly-energetic performer" and was pushing boundaries with this tour, which was described as "vibrant" and a "Michael Jackson-level affair". MWave stated that G-Dragon showed that he's indeed one of a kind while "he burst forth in his own style and personality all throughout the concert". The critic concluded that the rapper "filled every corner of the stage perfectly with his solo presence". His second world tour, Act III: M.O.T.T.E, received rave reviews from critics and fans and was noted for being more intimate. In a review for one of his performances in Thailand, Riddhi Chakraborty from Rolling Stone India praised the singer-rapper for delivering "precise choreograph[ies]" with "unwavering enthusiasm [...] and brutal honesty" while Kimberly Lim from The New Paper also noted how G-Dragon "performed gravity-defying and slick moves" at one of his concerts in Macau.

Billboard K-Town describes his productions as large-scale, dramatic and infused with his personality, often incorporating a live band alongside professional dancers, various costume changes and the use of pyrotechnics. The singer-rapper's stage outfits have also garnered attention, with Dazed magazine noting that G-Dragon has the "rare ability to play loose and wild with his sartorial choices", and to put together outfits that make the "ridiculous become sublime, [and] the impractical into the necessary". G-Dragon explains that while his "[s]tage outfits are loud, outspoken, glamorous, [and] fancy", they are very different from his "normal day to day clothing", preferring to wear "loud and outspoken" clothes when performing compare to a more casual style off-stage.

While promoting his EP Kwon Ji Yong, G-Dragon revealed that he originally created the alter ego G-Dragon to keep his stage persona separated from who he really is. Seoul Beats described G-Dragon as "glamorous, cocky, [and] energetic", compared to his real-life "humble [and] understated" personality. In a 2017 interview with Elle, he described G-Dragon as someone who is "full of self-confidence" and is "a fancier and stronger person" while Kwon Ji-yong is an "introvert[ed] guy" with "many thoughts in his mind". After the release of Kwon Ji Yong and while touring for Act III: M.O.T.T.E, G-Dragon expressed a desire to distance himself from his alter ego. Rolling Stone India noted how during the third act of the concerts, fans were able to witness "the rather menacing G-Dragon melt away into the shy Ji Yong".

== Public image ==
"There are too many references and ideas, colors and shapes — yet on him, they feel just right. Where there's a constricted idea of masculinity in society, G-Dragon exploded the paradigm for how a man could be. He was like Prince, only less interested in making his body a sexual object. In G-Dragon's world, fashion could be a fun, playful, and joyful, rather than exacting and serious. Clothes could be an expression of your core identity, or they could just be something you're trying out — a mood, a whim, or an idea. He was postmodern in the best sense of the word. He proved that you could, in some way, be anything and everything." — E.Alex Jung from Vulture

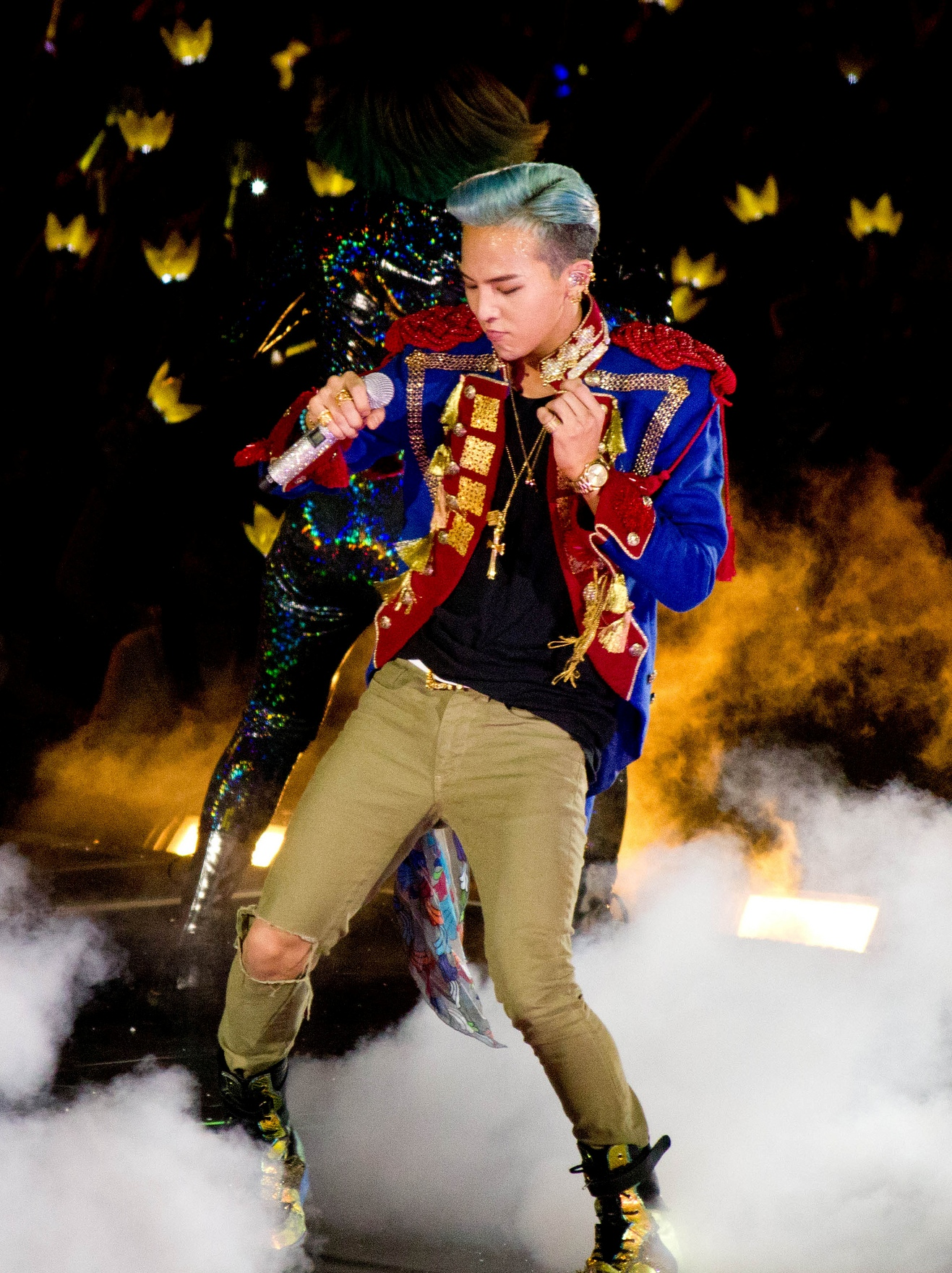
G-Dragon performing in 2012

G-Dragon maintains tight control over his career, publicly opposing the idea of singers as "products" of the entertainment industry and criticizing agencies who do not give their artists creative control. Known for reinventing his image and style throughout the years, the singer-rapper is often described as the "most fashionable" member in BigBang. While promoting Heartbreaker, his blonde hairstyle gained popularity among his fans and became one of the top hairstyles of the year. He has consistently altered his hair throughout the years, ranging from various shades of colors to different cuts. Additionally, his constant sporting of triangular scarves during promotions for BigBang's EP Always became a trend among teenagers and were later nicknamed the "Big Bang scarves".

G-Dragon is noted for his androgynous appearance, with the Korea JoongAng Daily calling him "a notable star fashioning genderless style", noting how his image deviates from the fixed gender type of men and women. Vogue Magazine stated how his androgynous or gender-bending appearance defies a "society that maintains traditional, patriarchal values and a noted adherence to manufactured beauty ideals". When he collaborated with Italian footwear designer Giuseppe Zanotti to launch a limited-edition collection of men's and women's shoes, he stated that "it's not just girls or women who get excited and worked up over pretty shoes. [...] [G]uys can feel that way, too". G-Dragon's fashion has been described as "quirky and experimental" by Rushali Pawar of the International Business Times while Taylor Glasby from the British Magazine Dazed and Confused characterized his style as "fluid and far-reaching", calling him a "natural style chameleon". Monica Kim from Vogue Magazine admired his "uncanny knack for larger-than-life style that remains wearably cool". Joe Coscarelli from The New York Times calls him "a style icon, a chameleon who often makes peak-era Lady Gaga seem staid". He has covered various issues of W, Dazed, Hypebeast, Elle, Vogue, and landed editorials in Harper's Bazaar, Esquire, among other Asian magazines.

In 2011, G-Dragon shared that he was initially self-conscious of his role as a musician, noting how he had "changed many things including the tone of my voice because I was conscious about my job when I was in front of others". Aware that his public image is important when promoting his materials, G-Dragon notes that "what the public perceives of [me] is my doing so it's my fault if I give off the wrong intention". By 2015, he has become more relaxed, stating that now he doesn't "do music or dress up in order to impress people around me. I don't try to be conscious [about music and fashion]".

G-Dragon was chosen by The Chosun Ilbo as the Best Dressed Celebrity of 2012, while in 2014, he was chosen as one of the Best-Dressed Street Style Stars of the year by New York. G-Dragon was included in the 2015's and 2016's Business of Fashion's 500 Global Fashion Leaders list, making him one of the five Koreans on the list, and the only K-Pop act to have made the cut. He was also the only Korean in Hypebeast's 100 Innovators list.

== Other ventures ==
=== Business ===
In 2012, G-Dragon built a pension hotel in Gyenggi-do as a gift to his family, putting in approximately 1 billion won (US$920,000 at the time) to help finance it. The pension includes 11 suites. On October 20, 2015, G-Dragon officially opened his first cafe on Jeju Island, under the name of "Monsant Cafe". The South Korean indie band Hyukoh was the first artist to play at the café in September 2015. In 2017, his second cafe named "Untitled, 2017", inspired by the title of his most recent single, was built, along with a bowling alley both designed by G-Dragon. It is located within YG Entertainment's YG Republique building complex YG Town of Jeju Shinhwa World resort, for which he is an ambassador.

=== Endorsements and commercial activities ===
G-Dragon along with BigBang are among Korea's highest paid celebrities over endorsements, reportedly having an asking price of $1–1.5 million USD per endorsement in 2011. In August 2015, he became the face of Airbnb in the Asian market. In 2016, G-Dragon started endorsing Shinsegae, the largest retailer in South Korea and his merchandises were reported to take up over 49% of sales in the YG store. He also endorsed the Italian sportswear label Kappa as part of their 100th anniversary and it was reported that he earned US$1.9 million from the brand. He was selected as the face of Hyundai's Verna concept vehicle, appearing at an auto show in Beijing which saw 10,000 fans gather to see him in person. In 2017, G-Dragon endorsed Vidal Sassoon in China, he also joined Nike's Air Max Day global campaign and endorsed the Vapormax shoe, causing instant sell-outs across online stores in South Korea. The same year, he was announced as the official ambassador of luxury resort Jeju Shinhwa World, located on Jeju Island, in which he directly participated in the development of the resort complex. After completing his military service, he has been an ambassador for brands such as Nongfu Spring, TS shampoo, Tiger Beer, BMW, and Hana Financial Bank.

=== Fashion and art ===
In 2013, G-Dragon partnered with Ambush for a special collaboration release which includes apparel and accessories. The collection highlights G-Dragon's signature crest by utilizing the design throughout the entire release. In 2014, he partnered with Chow Tai Fook Enterprises jewelry and launched a collection designed by himself. G-Dragon opened an art exhibition in 2015 under the name Peaceminusone: Beyond the Stage. The exhibition features 200 works of art from 12 domestic and international artists including Michael Scoggins, Sophie Clements and James Clar. Having worked on the exhibition for over a year, its aim is to bring the modern art and pop culture together in order to "introduce domestic artists to the public, who are unfamiliar with art or who find art unapproachable". The show was held at the Seoul Museum of Art from June 6 to August 23. He also launched a collaboration with Giuseppe Zanotti and designed two unisex shoe styles. G-dragon is an avid art collector, being included in ARTnews' 2019 list of 50 art collectors to watch. His collection includes Millionare Nurse by Richard Prince, which sold at a Sotheby's auction in 2014 for $3.3 million. He also owns the George Condo pieces Big John and the four-piece set Jean-Louis, Jean Louis with One Ear, Jean Louis' wife and Jean Louis' Wife's sister. He organized an auction of some of his possessions through Pharrell Williams' Joopiter auction house in September 2024: included were pieces of clothing, artwork and furniture. The auction was accompanied by an exhibition at the Daelim museum.

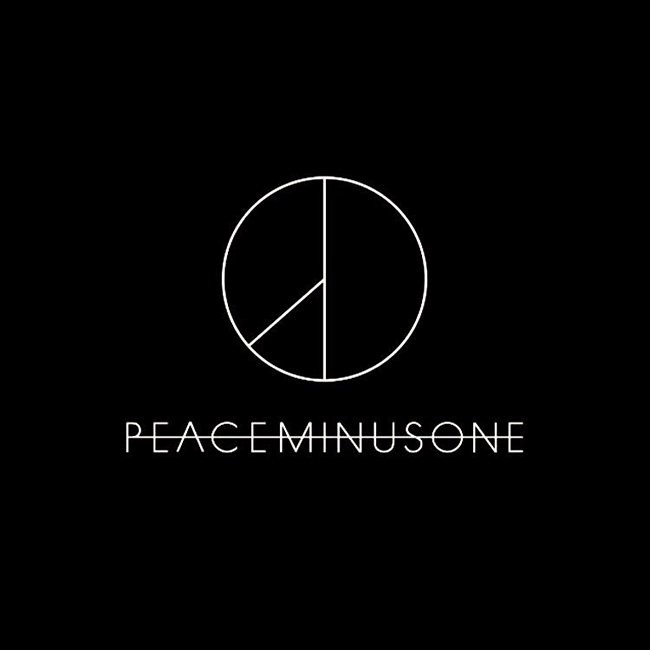
Peaceminusone logo

In 2016, he collaborated with the brand 8 Seconds, part of the Samsung C&T Fashion Group, designing his first street fashion collection. The collection featured innovative "genderless" designs, suitable for both men and women. He went on to design three collections for the brand. In October the same year, G-Dragon launched his personal fashion brand Peaceminusone with his long-time stylist Gee Eun. The first collection included tees, caps, jewelry, and in-ear headphones. Initially an online-only line, it was launched as a physical store at the Dover Street Market in London and in Seoul. Peaceminusone collaborated with Ambush in November for a capsule collection of denim pieces, marking his third collaboration with the label. The same year, he starred in the official campaign for Seoul-based fashion label Juun.J's FW16 collection with Taeyang. He also became a brand ambassador for French fashion house Chanel, and starred in the label's Gabrielle bag campaign during 2017, alongside Pharrell.

In 2017, G-Dragon launched pop-up shops for his brand Peaceminusone, starting in Seoul, and continuing with Miami, Osaka and Hong Kong. Later that year he collaborated with Vogue to do another pop-up shop in Seoul, selling limited edition Peaceminusone X Vogue apparel. He also launched a collaboration with French retailer Colette which was made available to purchase on his online store. In 2019, he collaborated with Nike, releasing PEACEMINUSONE Para-Noise Air Force 1 shoes. A second version of PEACEMINUSONE Para-Noise Air Force 1 shoes in white color was released in 2020. Further collaborations, the PEACEMINUSONE x Nike Kwondo 1 and PEACEMINUSONE x Nike Kwondo 1 "Panda", were released in December 2021 and April 2023, respectively.

He contributed to the self-titled AMBUSH book due to be published by Rizzoli on March 4, 2025.

In 2025, G-Dragon debuted a $1 million watch co-designed with Jacob & Co. at a Seoul store opening.

In 2026, G-Dragon collaborated with Jacob & Co. on the "Bandana Royale" collar, inspired by his signature scarf aesthetic and modeled after Chanel scarves.

=== Philanthropy ===
G-Dragon has shown support for numerous charity organizations over the years. Notably, the final concert of his world tour in 2013, a booth was erected where fans could donate to build a fishery in Haiti, as a collaboration with YG Entertainment's With Campaign, which he previously worked with to help build a school in Nepal. At the same event, he and his fans from 14 countries around the world donated 9.9 tons of rice wreaths, which was sent to help malnourished children, elderly living on their own, and other people in need. He's reportedly donated ₩81.8 million (US$80,000) every year on his birthday. G-Dragon donated ₩50 million (US$43,400) in 2011 (when fans donated under his name) and in 2012 (privately by himself) to Seoul National University Hospital to help children with diseases get treatment. This was revealed accidentally in 2017 as his name was engraved on a plaque honoring those who had contributed ₩100 million or more.

G-Dragon has used his image to raise awareness for multiple causes, including the UN Refugee Agency and the Red Campaign to fight AIDS. Additionally, in May 2017, a citrus tree forest was officially opened, Seogwipo on Jeju Island, named after G-Dragon's real name, Kwon Ji-yong. The fruit harvested from the forest will be donated to charity events.

In December 2023, G-Dragon announced he would be creating the JusPeace Foundation to combat drug addiction and support artists. The foundation was launched in August 2024. He donated 300 million won (US$230,000 at the time) to help start it up and serves as honorary chairman.

On 29 November 2025, Galaxy Corporation announced that G-Dragon decided to donate 1 million Hong Kong dollars (about 188 million Korean won) to aid Hong Kong fire victims and firefighters after a fire on November 26, 2025, damaged seven buildings in the high-rise apartment complex Wang Fuk Court in Tai Po, northern Hong Kong.

== Cultural impact and legacy ==
Described as a "genius singer-songwriter" by The Korea Times, G-Dragon's role in producing many of BigBang's materials so early in their career was considered "unusual" at the time, as most K-pop bands are manufactured instead of self-produced. His involvement has shaped how new idol groups interact with their music, with The Korea Times acknowledging that his "unprecedented popularity" and recognition "has inspired many young idol-wannabes to become singer-songwriters". Artists that have cited his work as an influence include Zico, Be'O, Got7's BamBam, BTS's Jungkook and J-Hope, Zerobaseone's Ricky, Astro's Rocky, Seventeen's S.Coups, Jaden Smith, Younha, One, Lee Seung-hwan, Kim Eana, DinDin, and Grimes, who states that K-pop, in particular G-Dragon, has influenced her musical style "more visually than anything else". Mix Nine's winner Woo Jin-young stated that G-Dragon's "This Love" inspired him to be a rapper.

His music has gained appreciation from critics. The song "One of a Kind" is listed in Korean music critic Kim Bong-hyun's book of most influential Korean hip hop songs from 1989 to 2016, naming it one of the 28 tracks that shaped the genre. It was also the only song by a solo artist to be included in The Dong-A Ilbo's 2016 list of the best male idol songs in the past 20 years. Meanwhile, Spin named "Crayon" the best K-pop single of 2012, with David Bevan commenting that the track "almost felt too big for the occasion, too brash to have come from the leader of a boy band". In 2013, "Crooked" was voted as MTV Iggy's Song of the Year, with the website commenting that "G-Dragon made a big splash in the world of K-pop and beyond with his solo album Coup d'Etat. 'Crooked' from that album was the endlessly playable sound of him breaking big". In 2008, G-Dragon became the youngest person to be listed on The 10 Greatest Korean Composers at the age of 20. The Korea Music Copyright Association currently lists over 180 songs under G-Dragon's name. In 2015, G-Dragon's annual earnings from song royalties was estimated to be over $700,000 a year. He was the highest paid touring singer-songwriter in Korea, earning the most from songwriting royalties in 2012. In 2018, he tied with YG Entertainment producer Teddy Park for the most earned royalties for lyrics writing and song composition within the field of popular music from the Korean Music Copyright Association. They both received Daesang awards for it, making G-Dragon the first, and only idol as of now, to receive this type of award. He has co-written 24 number-one songs on the Circle Digital Chart as of 2025.

G-Dragon was highlighted as one of the "50 Reasons Why Seoul is the Best City" by CNN in 2011 and topped the list of the "Most Influential Entities of K-Pop" by Ilgan Sports in 2013. That same year, collaborator Diplo declared that G-Dragon is a "phenom, [he's] bigger than the K-pop scene". The rapper has made Forbes Korea's list of "Korea 2030 Power Leaders" for three consecutive years, most recently in 2014. In 2018, 35 executives from 35 companies in the South Korean music industry chose G-Dragon as the best soloist in Korea while ABS-CBN lists him as their favorite K-pop idol leader, citing his creativity, dedication, and hard-work. That same year, The Guardian ranked G-Dragon No. 11 on their list of "30 Best Boyband Members", becoming only one of two Korean artists to be listed. G-Dragon has been called the "King of K-Pop" by various media publications including Rolling Stone, Dazed, and Vogue. His artistry, multi-hyphenate career, popularity and level of influence have drawn comparisons to American singer Michael Jackson by Billboard, Vogue, and i-D, who hailed him as "the millennial Michael Jackson". Despite his success as a solo artist and leader of BigBang, G-Dragon has admitted that he didn't realize how famous he was until he went on BigBang's first world tour. G-Dragon's cultural influence has become the subject of study at the University of Southern California, with a course offering titled "Crooked Studies of K-pop: The Case of G-Dragon".

== Personal life ==
In 2018, The Gazette Review estimated that G-Dragon's net worth is US$40 million.

G-Dragon began mandatory military service on February 27, 2018. After his basic training at, South Korea's 3rd Infantry 'White Skeleton' Division in Cheorwon, Gangwon Province, he was assigned as a regular soldier. He was discharged on October 26, 2019, at the headquarters of South Korean Army's Ground Operations Command in Yongin. He held an event nearby with around 3000 fans that same day.

In June 2024, the Korean Advanced Institute of Science and Technology named G-Dragon a visiting professor for a two-year period, whereby he would give leadership lectures to students of the university.

In April 2025, G-Dragon is working on a joint project with KAIST to secure global competitiveness by incorporating the latest science and technology into K-content.

=== Alleged drug use ===
G-Dragon tested positive for marijuana in 2011. Though a urine test back in August came back negative, a weak positive for marijuana was detected from testing the content of his hair in October. Since it was his first recorded offense with a minuscule amount of the drug, it resulted in an indictment and he was not charged. He later claimed to have accepted a cigarette offered by a fan in Japan during a party back in May, throwing it away after realizing it was not a normal cigarette. He made his first public appearance after the scandal at the 2011 MTV EMAs with his group.

On October 25, 2023, G-Dragon was booked by the Incheon Metropolitan Police and was under investigation for alleged drug use. The case was closed on December 13, 2023, due to a series of negative drug tests and insufficient evidence.

=== Real estate ===
G-Dragon's real estate portfolio includes multiple apartments: one in Cheongdam-dong (valued between 15 and 18 billion won), one in Seongsu-dong (valued at 3 billion won) and one in Hannam-dong (valued at 16.4 billion won). He also owns a mixed-use six story building in Cheongdam-dong which he purchased in 2017 for 8.85 billion won.

=== Controversies ===
In 2013, G-Dragon faced backlash for wearing blackface as a reference to the Trayvon Martin movement.

In 2026, G-Dragon faced backlash for wearing a shirt with a racist slur on it.

== Discography ==
- Heartbreaker (2009)
- Coup d'Etat (2013)
- Übermensch (2025)

== Filmography ==
- 무한상사 (Muhan Company) as Executive Director Kwon (2016)
- The Act III: Moment of Truth the End as himself (2018)
- Good Day (2025)

== Live performances ==
=== Tour ===
- One of a Kind World Tour (2013)
- Act III: M.O.T.T.E World Tour (2017)
- Übermensch World Tour (2025)

=== Fanmeeting tours ===
Fam+ily : Family : Fam I Love You
Date	City	Country	Venue	Attendance	Ref.
February 6, 2026	Seoul	South Korea	KSPO Dome	40,000	
February 7, 2026	Seoul	South Korea	KSPO Dome	40,000	
February 8, 2026	Seoul	South Korea	KSPO Dome	40,000	
February 13, 2026	Yokohama	Japan	Pia Arena MM	—	
February 14, 2026	Yokohama	Japan	Pia Arena MM	—	
February 15, 2026	Yokohama	Japan	Pia Arena MM	—	
February 21, 2026	Bangkok	Thailand	BITEC Live	—	
February 22, 2026	Bangkok	Thailand	BITEC Live	—	
Total				90,000	

=== Music festivals ===
List of performances, showing dates, location, and relevant informations
Event	Date	Venue	City	Country	Performed song(s)	Ref.
SBS Gayo Daejeon	December 25, 2024	Inspire Arena	Incheon	South Korea	"Power"; "Sober"; "Crooked"	
Le Gala des Pièces Jaunes	January 23, 2025	Paris La Défense Arena	Paris	France	"Power"; "Home Sweet Home" (with Taeyang); "Good Boy" (with Taeyang)	
K-Star Spark in Bangkok	February 22, 2025	Rajamangala National Stadium	Bangkok	Thailand	"Power"; "MichiGo"; "One of a Kind"; "Crayon"; "Crooked"	
Jack Nicklaus Golf Club Korea	May 4, 2025	Songdo	Incheon	South Korea	"Power"; "One of a Kind"; "Too Bad"; "Crayon"; "Crooked"	
Head in the Clouds Festival	May 31, 2025	Brookside Park	Pasadena	United States	"Power"; "Home Sweet Home"; "MichiGo"; "One of a Kind"; "Crayon"; "The Leaders" (with CL (rapper)); "Drama"; "Take Me"; "Bullshit"; "Too Bad"	
K-Star Spark in Hanoi	June 21, 2025	Mỹ Đình National Stadium	Hanoi	Vietnam	"Power"; "Home Sweet Home"; "Too Bad"; "Crayon"; "Crooked"	
2025 Singapore Grand Prix	October 3, 2025	Marina Bay Street Circuit	Singapore		"Power"; "Home Sweet Home"; "MichiGo"; "One of a Kind"; "Crayon"; "Heartbreaker" (with Wing); "Bullshit"; "Take Me"; "A Boy"; "Too Bad"; "Drama"; "I Love It"; "Today"; "Crooked"	
Madly Medley Festival	October 18, 2025	Paradise City Culture Park	Incheon	South Korea	"Power"; "Home Sweet Home"; "Crayon"; "Heartbreaker"; "Crooked"	
Le Gala des Pièces Jaunes	January 22, 2026	Paris La Défense Arena	Paris	France	"Drama"; "Too Bad"	
K-Star Spark in Malaysia	January 31, 2026	Stadium Merdeka	Kuala Lumpur	Malaysia	"Power"; "Home Sweet Home"; "Crayon"; "Too Bad"; "Crooked"	
Krazy Super Concert	February 17, 2026	Dubai Media City Amphitheatre	Dubai	United Arab Emirates	"Power"; "Home Sweet Home"; "Crayon"; "Too Bad"; "Crooked"	

=== Awards shows ===
List of performances, showing dates, location, and relevant informations
Event	Dates	Venue	City	Country	Performed song(s)	Ref(s)
2024 MAMA Awards	November 23, 2024	Kyocera Dome Osaka	Osaka	Japan	"Power"; "Home Sweet Home"	
2025 MAMA Awards	November 29, 2025	Kai Tak Stadium	Hong Kong	China	"Drama"; "Heartbreaker"; "Untitled, 2014"	
2025 Melon Music Awards	December 20, 2025	Gocheok Sky Dome	Seoul	South Korea	"Power"; "Home Sweet Home"; "Too Bad (Alan Walker Remix)"; "Crooked"	
