= Crayon (song) =

2012 single by G-Dragon

Single by G-Dragon

from the EP One of a Kind
- Released: September 15, 2012
- Genre: Hip hop; pop; EDM; trap
- Length: 3:17
- Label: YG Entertainment
- Songwriters: G-Dragon; Teddy Park
- Producers: Teddy; G-Dragon

G-Dragon singles chronology
"That XX" (2012)	"Crayon" (2012)	"Black" / "Who You?" (2013)

Music video
- "Crayon" on YouTube

"Crayon" (Korean: 크레용) is a song by South Korean rapper G-Dragon. It was released on September 15, 2012, as the second single of his first extended play One of a Kind (2012). It was written and produced by G-Dragon and Teddy Park.

== Composition ==
"Crayon" is mix between hip-hop and electronic music. The title is a neologism made on the compound word "Crazy On". The track was noted to showcase the experimental mind of the composers.

"Crayon" is the first Korean mainstream music to introduce a trap genre.

== Critical reception ==
Spin named "Crayon" the best K-pop single of 2012, with David Bevan commenting that the track "almost felt too big for the occasion, too brash to have come from the leader of a boy band." Corban Goble of Pitchfork called "Crayon" "magnificent," writing the song represents "a logical collision of fluorescent, pound-the-alarm EDM, the tomahawk chop chant, and G-Dragon's referential, sharp rapping; every element throbbed with electricity."

David Jeffries of Allmusic deemed the track "kinetic", feeling that it comes off "as a top production that somehow escaped the house of Mad Decent while Diplo was sleeping." Jon Caramanica of The New York Times wrote that "Crayon" is a "pneumatic-intensity thumper with a Southern rap backbone" and added the song set "an almost impossibly high bar." Nick Catucci of Rolling Stone gave the single three out of five stars.

Jeff Benjamin of Fuse considered "Crayon" "one of G-Dragon's signature tracks", writing that the single's "crazy dance joint is guaranteed to make" audience in live performances "go nuts". E. Alex Jung of Vulture.com felt that the track was "the best example of his chameleonic power" since it "demonstrated his ability to metabolize pop culture and fashion on a global scale and reform it into his own aesthetic."

== Commercial performance ==
Been released in the last day of the tracking week, "Crayon" managed to debut at number 13 in the Gaon Digital Chart. The following week, the single rose to a peak position of number 3, charting behind G-Dragon's own song "Missing You". That week, "Crayon" was the third best selling song and the second most streamed, with 363,647 downloads and 2,251,773 audio streams. The single remained at the Top 3 for two more weeks. In the Gaon Digital Monthly chart, "Crayon" charted at number eight for two consecutive months. The single finished 2012 with 1,746,682 downloads sold and over 20 million streams.

== Music video ==
In the music video for "Crayon", G-Dragon transforms himself into several characters: a psychologist and his patient, Pinocchio, a raver, a DJ, a pretty lady, an American football player, among others. He is seen with multiple hairstyles, in several shades, such as pink, orange, neon yellow and a multicoloured "cotton candy" hair.

Jon Caramanica of The New York Times described the video as a "cultural treasure — hilarious, dizzying, and full of retina-frying explosions of color." Star2.com hailed the video "kaleidoscopic" with "head-turning" features and "larger-than-life outfits". E. Alex Jung from Vulture.com felt that the music video was "full of jokes", with "nods to Korea's burgeoning fast fashion industry", in the opening with "a popping pink Wonder Woman robe before moving to jackets in holographic gold" to "Thom Browne's 2012 fall collection with its fun-house proportions." Jung also noted that the music video references to the Joker of the movie The Dark Knight and G-Dragon appearing "in drag" are questioning the viewer "why are we taking any of this so seriously?". Fuse chose "Crayon" as one of the rapper's "must-see music videos".

== Live performances ==
G-Dragon performed "Crayon", along with other tracks from his EP, on the talk show You Hee-yeol's Sketchbook. His appearance on the show resulted in an increase of 75% in the demand for audience tickets. The rapper then performed the single on the music show Inkigayo to positive reception. The Korea Herald hailed these performances a "joyful adventure" to the audience. The members of G-Dragon's group, Big Bang, performed a remake of the song in the 2012 Mnet Asian Music Awards. T.O.P wrote new raps for the first verse, Daesung sang the first chorus, Taeyang rapped in the second verse and Seungri joined for the second chorus. During his first world tour, G-Dragon performed a hybrid remix version of "Crayon" with BigBang's single Fantastic Baby.

== Accolades ==
Awards for "Crayon"
Year	Organization	Award	Result	Ref.
2012	Melon Music Awards	Digital Bonsang	Nominated	
2012	Mnet Asian Music Awards	Best Male Artist	Won	
2012	Singapore Entertainment Awards	Most Popular K-pop Music Video	Nominated	

Music program awards
Program	Date
M Countdown (Mnet)	September 27, 2012
M Countdown (Mnet)	October 4, 2012
M Countdown (Mnet)	October 11, 2012

== Charts and sales ==
=== Weekly charts ===
Chart (2012)	Peak position
South Korea (Gaon)	3
South Korea (K-pop Hot 100)	4
US World Digital Songs (Billboard)	5

=== Year-end charts ===
Chart (2012)	Peak position
South Korea (Gaon)	44
South Korea (K-pop Hot 100)	45

=== Sales ===
Country	Sales
South Korea (digital)	1,954,834
