= Mike Yarwood =

English comedian (1941–2023)

Mike Yarwood OBE
- Yarwood on This Is Your Life in 1978
- Born: Michael Edward Yarwood; 14 June 1941; Bredbury, Cheshire, England
- Died: 8 September 2023 (aged 82); Hounslow, London, England
- Occupations: Actor; comedian; impressionist
- Years active: 1964–2003
- Spouse: Sandra Burville (m. 1969–1985)
- Children: 2

Michael Edward Yarwood (14 June 1941 – 8 September 2023) was an English impressionist, comedian and actor. He was one of Britain's top-rated entertainers, regularly appearing on television from the 1960s to the 1980s.

== Early life ==
Michael Edward Yarwood was born on 14 June 1941 in Bredbury, Cheshire. After leaving secondary modern school, he worked as a messenger and then a salesman at a garment warehouse. He played football as a child and tried out for the professional team Oldham Athletic. Later he was a director of Stockport County Football Club.

His showbiz career started after a talent show at a pub in Dukinfield in which he was the runner-up. This encouraged him to tour the circuit of pubs and working men's clubs in Northern England. His breakthrough into television was then as a warm-up man on Comedy Bandbox – a revue which was a proving ground for British comedians at that time.

== Career ==
=== London Palladium ===
Yarwood appeared on British television shows in the 1960s and 1970s. Before his various eponymous BBC television series, he worked for the ITV franchise holder ATV, and for Thames Television after he left the BBC. Yarwood owed his initial success to the Sunday Night at the London Palladium variety spectacular, on which he first appeared in 1964. His appearance coincided with the senior political career of Labour Party leader and Prime Minister Harold Wilson, whom Yarwood impersonated.

=== The "Cotton Crew" at the BBC ===
Yarwood's career peaked during the 1970s when he was one of a stable of stars under the BBC head of light entertainment Bill Cotton, alongside Bruce Forsyth, Dick Emery, Morecambe and Wise, Val Doonican and the Two Ronnies – all performers who started their careers on ITV during the preceding decade. By the late 1970s, some of them had left the BBC and returned to ITV.

At their peak, Yarwood's BBC TV shows regularly attracted 18 million viewers. The shows included a varied mix of comic sketches, guest musicians, and a closing song sung by Yarwood (introduced by the line "and this is me", which became the title of his first autobiography).

The Mike Yarwood Christmas Show on BBC1 in 1977 was watched by 21.4 million people and was the highest-rated British television programme of that year. The show remains one of the most-watched television programmes, other than news and sport, in British history.

Both Yarwood and Morecambe and Wise signed up with Thames Television, Morecambe and Wise in 1978 and Yarwood in 1982, with mixed results; Morecambe and Wise fared better than Yarwood and their ratings remained relatively high.

=== Impressions ===
Among the other prominent personalities Yarwood portrayed were:

- Eddie Waring – rugby league commentator
- Brian Clough – football manager
- Robin Day – BBC political interviewer
- Magnus Pyke – TV science presenter
- Alf Garnett – Warren Mitchell's character from Till Death Us Do Part
- Columbo – Peter Falk's American detective in the series of the same name
- Frank Spencer – the sitcom character portrayed by Michael Crawford in Some Mothers Do 'Ave 'Em
- Ted Heath – Wilson's Conservative Party rival

Using colour-separation overlay and video editing, Yarwood frequently staged set pieces in which he appeared as several characters at the same time using pre-recorded segments.

Yarwood's performance as Harold Wilson became his trademark. He also included Prince Charles as one of his regular impressions.

Yarwood's characterisations also created catchphrases that came to be identified with famous figures, even if they never actually used them. However, the two most famous were spoken by the people he caricatured. "Silly Billy", spoken by his caricature of Chancellor of the Exchequer Denis Healey, was used by Healey to describe strikers. It has been said that Yarwood invented the phrase "I mean that most sincerely, folks" for his caricature of Opportunity Knocks presenter Hughie Green, although Green has said he came up with the phrase himself, acknowledging that he used it so that "the impersonators had something to hang on to".

=== Later career ===
Yarwood was the subject of a This Is Your Life special, presented by Eamonn Andrews on 31 May 1978. A behind-the-scenes documentary called Mike Yarwood: This is His Life was made six years later, also featuring Andrews, alongside contributions from Bruce Forsyth, David Frost and Harold Wilson.

Yarwood's Thames TV show was cancelled at the end of 1987, and he concentrated on stage work. Subsequent attempts to resurrect his television career failed, although he did make an appearance on the satirical show Have I Got News for You in November 1995.

In the mid-1990s, Yarwood had the chance to return to the stage as prime minister John Major, but failed to re-establish himself before Major's premiership ended. He claimed that one of the difficulties in impersonating John Major and Tony Blair was that they were "nice guys". His career prematurely ended owing to anxiety problems, precipitating stage fright and two collapses on stage.

In 2003, Yarwood made a rare public appearance at the Albany comedy club in London, at the invitation of Bob Monkhouse. It was to be Monkhouse's last show, which was filmed for a proposed TV documentary, but ended up airing in December 2016 as a one-off special for BBC Four.

In 2021, Yarwood's Christmas shows were licensed from Fremantle/Thames by That's TV to broadcast the shows as part of its festive offering, alongside other programmes such as The Kenny Everett Video Show, The Benny Hill Show and Beadle's About, which had not been seen in full on a British television channel in more than 20 years.

== Personal life ==
Yarwood was married to the dancer Sandra Burville from 8 November 1969 until 1985. They had two daughters, Charlotte and Clare.

In May 1976, Yarwood was appointed an OBE in Harold Wilson's retirement honours list. Yarwood collected the insignia at Buckingham Palace on 8 December that year.

In October 1999, Yarwood underwent treatment for depression at the Priory Clinic in Roehampton, London.

From 2007, Yarwood lived alone in Weybridge, Surrey.

In 2021 it was reported that he was a resident of Brinsworth House, a residential and nursing retirement home for theatre and entertainment professionals in Twickenham, west London.

Yarwood died in Hounslow, west London, on 8 September 2023, at the age of 82.

== Filmography ==
- Three of a Kind (BBC) (1967)
- Will the Real Mike Yarwood Stand Up? (ATV) (1968–1969)
- Look: Mike Yarwood (BBC) (1971–1976)
- Mike Yarwood in Persons (BBC) (1976–1981)
- The Mike Yarwood Show (Thames) (1982–1987)
- Yarwood's in Town (Thames) (1982) Live on-stage show

== Bibliography ==
- And This Is Me (1974)
- Mike Yarwood's Confession Album (1978)
- Impressions of My Life (1986)
