= Pension hotel =

In the Philippines a pension hotel is somewhat different from pension lodging. A pension hotel is usually not a boarding house, but is a real hotel. A pension hotel provides rooms with no or few amenities. They usually have private bathrooms with showers.

A pension hotel usually has a window air conditioning unit, but the hallways and other areas of the hotel are usually cooled only by fans. Some pension hotels, especially in beach areas, provide only ceiling fans for cooling. The rates for pension hotels are much lower than midrange hotels. The rates range from P350 to P1800 a night, or around $6–$35.

Pension hotels also exist in Europe. European pension hotels may offer a bed in a room shared with others and the bathroom may be a communal one.
