= One of a Kind World Tour =

2013 concert tour by G-Dragon

- Tour by G-Dragon
- One of a Kind World Tour Poster
- Location: Asia
- Associated album: One of a Kind
- Start date: March 30, 2013
- End date: September 1, 2013
- No. of shows: 27

G-Dragon concert chronology
- Shine a Light Concert (2009); One of a Kind World Tour (2013); Act III: M.O.T.T.E World Tour (2017)

The One of a Kind World Tour was the first headlining concert tour by South Korean singer and rapper G-Dragon, in support of his first EP One of a Kind (2012). The tour visited 9 countries and 13 cities in 2013, gathering a total of 590,000 fans, making it the most attended concert tour by a Korean solo artist at the time.

== Background ==
On January 14, 2013, YG Entertainment announced that G-Dragon will hold his first world tour, and his first solo concert since 2009. The production of the tour costed $3.5 Million, making it the largest scale in Korean history. The tour was jointly directed by choreographers Travis Payne and Stacy Walker who previously worked on Michael Jackson's This Is It concerts. The stage was designed by Michael Cotten, who has decorated the stages of the Super Bowl, the Olympics and Jackson.

== Reception ==
Billboard claimed that G-Dragon was a "highly-energetic performer" and was pushing boundaries with this tour, which was described as "vibrant" and an "Michael Jackson-level affair". KpopStarz called the concert "spectacular", praised the diversity of the show and said that G-Dragon "can create his own 'bang' on the stage.". MWave stated that G-Dragon showed that he's indeed one of a kind while "he burst forth in his own style and personality all throughout the concert." The critic concluded that the rapper "filled every corner of the stage perfectly with his solo presence." MeRadio highlighted the "great selection of songs and the way they were arranged", the laser effects, pyrotechnics, holograms, and the singer's charisma and stage presence as the reasons why the concert was entertaining. In Japan, G-Dragon became the first Korean solo artist to hold concerts at four dome-arenas.

== Special guests ==
- BigBang
- Taeyang
- T.O.P
- Seungri
- Daesung
- 2NE1
- CL
- Tablo
- Lee Hi

== Set list ==
First show in Seoul (Day 2)
1. "MichiGo"
2. "Heartbreaker"
3. "One Of A Kind"
4. "Light It Up" (ft. Tablo)
5. "The Leaders" (ft. CL)
6. "Butterfly"
7. "Missing You"
8. "That XX"
9. "Without You" (ft. Lee Hi)
10. "Today"
11. "A Boy"
12. "I Am The Best" (2NE1)
13. "I Love You" (2NE1)
14. "This Love"
15. "One Year Station"
16. "Obsession"
17. "She's Gone"
18. "Crayon + Fantastic Baby"

Encore

1. "Breathe"
2. "Bad Boy"
3. "MichiGo"
Final in Seoul (Day 2)
1. "MichiGo"
2. "Heartbreaker"
3. "One Of A Kind"
4. "Coup D'etat"
5. "The Leaders" (ft. CL)
6. "Butterfly"
7. "Missing You" (ft. Suhyun of AKMU)
8. "That XX"
9. "This Love"
10. "Today"
11. "A Boy"
12. "Light It Up" (ft. Tablo)
13. "Obsession"
14. "She's Gone"
15. "I Am The Best" (2NE1)
16. "The Baddest Female" (CL)
17. "Do You Love Me" (2NE1)
18. "Crooked"
19. "Crayon + Fantastic Baby"

Encore

1. "Bad Boy"
2. "Bad Boy" (with Big Bang)
3. "Heaven" (with Big Bang)
4. "Fantastic Baby" (with Big Bang)
5. "MichiGo"
6. "Crooked"

== Tour dates ==
Date	City	Country	Venue	Attendance
March 30, 2013	Seoul	South Korea	Olympic Gymnastics Arena	26,000
March 31, 2013	Seoul	South Korea	Olympic Gymnastics Arena	26,000
April 6, 2013	Fukuoka	Japan	Fukuoka Dome	50,000
April 20, 2013	Saitama	Japan	Seibu Dome	80,000
April 21, 2013	Saitama	Japan	Seibu Dome	80,000
April 27, 2013	Osaka	Japan	Kyocera Dome	150,000
April 28, 2013	Osaka	Japan	Kyocera Dome	150,000
April 29, 2013	Osaka	Japan	Kyocera Dome	150,000
May 4, 2013	Beijing	China	MasterCard Center	20,000
May 5, 2013	Beijing	China	MasterCard Center	20,000
May 9, 2013	Taipei	Taiwan	Taipei Arena	26,000
May 10, 2013	Taipei	Taiwan	Taipei Arena	26,000
May 17, 2013	Hong Kong	China	AsiaWorld–Arena	23,000
May 18, 2013	Hong Kong	China	AsiaWorld–Arena	23,000
May 25, 2013	Shanghai	China	Mercedes-Benz Arena	20,000
May 26, 2013	Shanghai	China	Mercedes-Benz Arena	20,000
June 1, 2013	Nagoya	Japan	Nagoya Dome	—
June 2, 2013	Nagoya	Japan	Nagoya Dome	—
June 7, 2013	Bangkok	Thailand	Impact Arena	20,000
June 8, 2013	Bangkok	Thailand	Impact Arena	20,000
June 15, 2013	Jakarta	Indonesia	Mata Elang International Stadium	—
June 16, 2013	Jakarta	Indonesia	Mata Elang International Stadium	—
June 22, 2013	Kuala Lumpur	Malaysia	Bukit Jalil National Stadium	—
June 29, 2013	Singapore		Singapore Indoor Stadium	14,000
June 30, 2013	Singapore		Singapore Indoor Stadium	14,000
August 31, 2013	Seoul	South Korea	Olympic Gymnastics Arena	—
September 1, 2013	Seoul	South Korea	Olympic Gymnastics Arena	—
Total				590,000
