= Four of a Kind (TV series) =

- Starring: Mother; Naomi Durst Sisters Calli, Kendra, Megan, Sarah
- Country of origin: United States
- No. of seasons: 1
- No. of episodes: 6

Production
- Executive producer: Steve Michaels
- Running time: 22 minutes

Original release
- Network: Lifetime
- Release: March 15 – March 29, 2011

Four of a Kind is a reality series that aired on Lifetime in the United States and TVtropolis in Canada. It is produced by Asylum Entertainment. The program follows the Durst sisters, Calli, Kendra, Megan, and Sarah, quadruplets who live in Buffalo, Minnesota. The Dursts are one of about 60 known sets of identical quadruplets worldwide. The program also features their mother, Naomi, and older brother, Travis.

The sisters appeared on several television programs as pre-schoolers, including The Tonight Show with Jay Leno and The Today Show. During the girls' senior year, their mother agreed to a proposed reality program for an amount that would considerably cover the sisters' college education.

For three months in 2010, a film crew followed the sisters during their senior year of high school, with the resulting series premiering on March 15, 2011. According to Lifetime, the program is intended to portray the lives of the girls as they deal with the usual trappings of adolescence, as well as Naomi facing an "empty nest" as the sisters leave home for college.
