= Three of a Kind (1967 TV series) =

British comedy show

Three of a Kind is a British comedy sketch and music television show starring Mike Yarwood, Ray Fell and Lulu. Two series were shown by the BBC during 1967.

Although successful, Yarwood turned down a third series as he hoped to follow Lulu in getting a series of his own. He went on to become one of the biggest stars of the 1970s.

Lulu said in her autobiography that she enjoyed working on the show, but wasn't comfortable with comedy.

== Episodes ==
=== Series 1 ===
Produced by John Ammonds.

Series 1: Broadcast Mondays on BBC2 at 8:05pm.

No. overall	No. in series	Title	Directed by	Written by	Original release date
1	1	"Episode 1"	John Ammonds	Austin Steele, Brad Ashton & Julius Emmanuel	12 June 1967
The first of a new series starring Lulu, Ray Fell and Mike Yarwood with the Go-Jos.
2	2	"Episode 2"	David Bell	Austin Steele, Brad Ashton, Peter Robinson & Neil Shand	19 June 1967
Starring Lulu, Ray Fell and Mike Yarwood with the Go-Jos.
3	3	"Episode 3"	John Ammonds	Austin Steele, Brad Ashton, Peter Robinson & Neil Shand	26 June 1967
Starring Lulu, Ray Fell and Mike Yarwood with the Go-Jos and Guest Star Stratford Johns.
4	4	"Episode 4"	John Ammonds	Austin Steele, Brad Ashton & Neil Shand	3 July 1967
Starring Lulu, Ray Fell and Mike Yarwood with the Go-Jos.
5	5	"Episode 5"	John Ammonds	Austin Steele, Brad Ashton & Neil Shand	10 July 1967
Starring Lulu, Ray Fell and Mike Yarwood with the Go-Jos.
6	6	"Episode 6"	John Ammonds	Austin Steele, Brad Ashton & Neil Shand	17 July 1967
Starring Lulu, Ray Fell and Mike Yarwood with the Go-Jos.

=== Series 2 ===
Series 2: Broadcast Mondays on BBC2 at 8:05pm

No. overall	No. in series	Title	Directed by	Written by	Original release date
7	1	"Episode 1"	Sydney Lotterby	Austin Steele, Brad Ashton, Barry Knowles, Les Lilley & Neil Shand	30 October 1967
The first of a new series starring Lulu, Ray Fell and Mike Yarwood with Malcolm Clare, Audrey Bayley, Alix Kirsta, Frances Pidgeon & Christine Pockett.
8	2	"Episode 2"	Sydney Lotterby	Austin Steele, Brad Ashton, Dan Douglass, Barry Knowles, Les Lilley & Neil Shand	8 November 1967
Starring Lulu, Ray Fell and Mike Yarwood with Malcolm Clare, Audrey Bayley, Alix Kirsta, Frances Pidgeon & Christine Pockett.
9	3	"Episode 3"	Sydney Lotterby	Barry Knowles, Brad Ashton, Peter Robinson & Les Lilley	13 November 1967
Starring Lulu, Ray Fell and Mike Yarwood with Malcolm Clare, Audrey Bayley, Alix Kirsta, Frances Pidgeon & Christine Pockett.
10	4	"Episode 4"	Sydney Lotterby	Dan Douglas, Brad Ashton, Barry Knowles & Les Lilley	20 November 1967
Starring Lulu, Ray Fell and Mike Yarwood with Malcolm Clare, Audrey Bayley, Alix Kirsta, Frances Pidgeon & Christine Pockett.
11	5	"Episode 5"	Sydney Lotterby	Brad Ashton, Don Douglas, Joe Steeples & Peter Robinson	27 November 1967
Starring Lulu, Ray Fell and Mike Yarwood with Malcolm Clare, Audrey Bayley, Alix Kirsta, Frances Pidgeon & Christine Pockett.

=== Archive Status ===
All 11 episodes are currently missing from the archives. No material is known to exist.
