= One of a Kind (G-Dragon EP) =

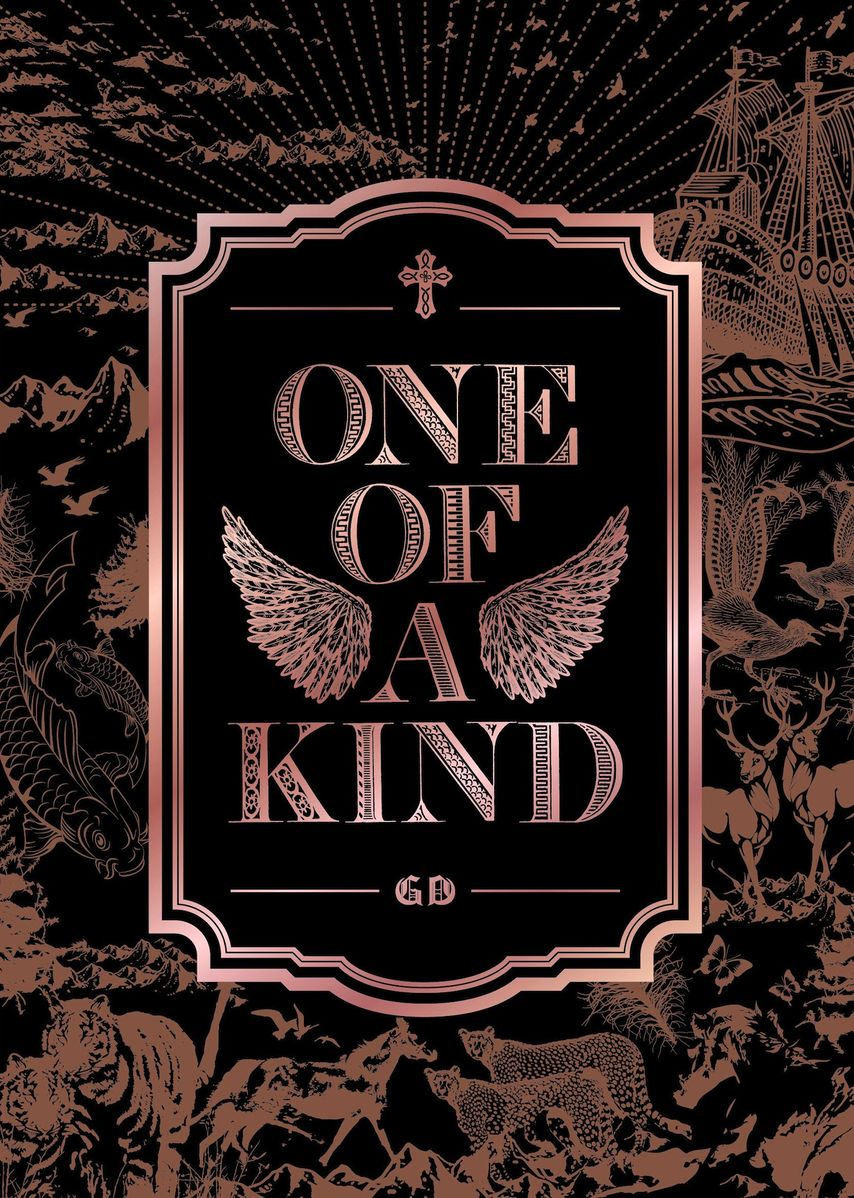

EP by G-Dragon
- Released: September 15, 2012
- Recorded: 2012
- Genre: K-pop; hip hop; dance-pop; R&B
- Length: 24:46
- Language: Korean
- Label: YG
- Producer: G-Dragon; Teddy; Choice37; Seo Won-jin; P.K; Dok2; Ham Seung-cheon; Kang Uk-jin

G-Dragon chronology
GD&TOP (2010)	One of a Kind (2012)	Coup d'Etat (2013)

Singles from One of a Kind
- 1. "That XX" Released: September 1, 2012; 2. "Crayon" Released: September 15, 2012

Alternative cover
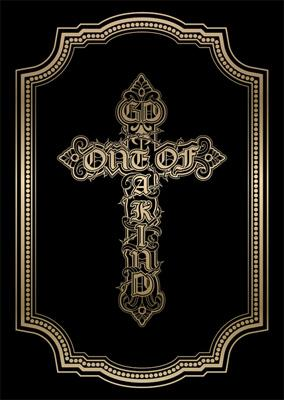
- Gold edition

One of a Kind is the first extended play by South Korean rapper G-Dragon. It was released digitally on September 15, 2012, and physically on September 18, through YG Entertainment. The EP consists of seven songs all written or co-written, and co-composed by G-Dragon himself.

Upon release, the album was a commercial success in South Korea. It peaked atop the Gaon Albums Chart and on the Billboard World Albums Chart. The EP also entered the Billboard 200 peaking at number 161, making G-Dragon the first Korean soloist with a Korean-language album to enter that chart. As of 2017, the album has sold over 260,000 copies in his native country, making it the highest selling album by a Korean soloist since the release of his debut album Heartbreaker (2009).

== Release and promotion ==
"One of a Kind" was released as a promotional single on August 24. "That XX" and "Crayon" were later released as first and second singles off the EP. Originally, the song "Without You" had a featuring first credited as "? from YG New Girl Group", when it was first announced that YG was starting a new girl group. Almost four years after the EP was released, the featuring vocals were revealed to be Rosé from said new girl group, Blackpink.

G-Dragon held a live-stream to countdown to and celebrate the release of the EP through Naver's Line TV, with guests Lydia Paek, Taeyang, producer Choice37, and rapper-producer Tablo of Epik High.

G-Dragon embarked on his first world tour, the One of a Kind World Tour, in support of the EP which marked the first time for a Korean soloist to hold a Japanese dome-arena tour. Many of his YG label-mates made special guest appearances on various stops throughout the tour, including his bandmates Big Bang, as well as 2NE1, Tablo, Lee Hi, and Akdong Musician. The tour began on March 30 and concluded on September 1, 2013, at Olympic Gymnastics Arena in Seoul, South Korea.

== Critical reception ==
Allmusic reviewer David Jeffries gave the album 3.5 out of 5 stars, remarking while "few others would have the daring or money for his flashy wardrobe, [G-Dragon] deserves that swagger due to his talent as well". Jeffries complimented the production in the tracks "One of a Kind" and "Crayon", and compared the record to Lady Gaga's music, writing that the rapper took his "'little monster" attitude and did "some envelope pushing" with the EP. Korean online magazine IZM included One of a Kind in their list of best albums of 2012, highlighting the variety of genres heard in the album, which included rock, hip hop and acoustic. IZM complimented G-Dragon's artistic direction and felt that the album brought the "recovery of swag and madness."

== Commercial performance ==
One of a Kind charted at number one on the Gaon Album Chart and became the best selling album of September, with 171,512 copies sold. By the end of the year the EP had sold 204,326 copies, becoming the fourth best-selling album of 2012. In 2013, the album sold additional 45,332 copies, and was the 43rd best selling album of the year. In Taiwan, the album went platinum with over 10,000 copies sold. In the United States, the album entered the Billboard 200 at number 161, making G-Dragon the fourth Korean artist to enter the chart. One of a Kind also topped the Billboard World Albums chart and peaked at number six on the Heatseekers chart.

With only one day of sales, the songs from the album sold over 1 million digital copies combined, and on the second week the songs sold 1.7 million copies. As of August 2016, the album and its songs has sold over 8.2 million copies.

== Accolades ==
Awards and nominations for One of a Kind
Year	Organization	Category	Result	Ref.
2012	Mnet Asian Music Awards	Album of the Year	Nominated	
2013	Seoul Music Awards	Record of the Year	Won	
2013	Golden Disk Awards	Digital Bonsang	Won	
2013	Korean Music Awards	Best Dance/Electronic Album	Nominated	

== Track listing ==
No.	Title	Lyrics	Music	Arrangement	Length
1.	"One of a Kind"	G-Dragon	G-Dragon; Choice37	Choice37; G-Dragon	3:26
2.	"Crayon" (크레용; Keureyong)	G-Dragon; Teddy	Teddy; G-Dragon	Teddy	3:17
3.	"Without You" (결국; Gyeolguk) (featuring Rosé of Blackpink)	G-Dragon	G-Dragon; Ham Seung-cheon; Kang Uk-jin	Ham Seung-cheon; Kang Uk-jin	4:03
4.	"That XX" (그 XX; Geu XX)	G-Dragon; Teddy	Teddy; G-Dragon; Seo Won Jin	Teddy; G-Dragon	3:20
5.	"Missing You" (featuring Kim Yoon Ah)	G-Dragon; Teddy	G-Dragon; P.K; Teddy	P.K	3:27
6.	"Today" (featuring Kim Jong Wan)	G-Dragon	G-Dragon; Choice37	Choice37	3:39
7.	"Light It Up" (불 붙여봐라; Bul Butyeobwara) (featuring Tablo and Dok2)	G-Dragon; Tablo; Dok2	Teddy; Tablo; G-Dragon; Dok2	Teddy; G-Dragon	3:34
Total length:					24:46

== Charts ==
=== Weekly charts ===
Chart (2012)	Peak position
Japanese Albums (Oricon)	12
South Korean Albums (Gaon)	1
US Billboard 200	161
US Heatseekers Albums (Billboard)	6
US World Albums (Billboard)	1

=== Monthly charts ===
Chart (2012)	Peak position
South Korean Albums (Gaon)	1

=== Year-end charts ===
Chart (2012)	Position
South Korean Albums (Gaon)	4
Chart (2013)	Position
South Korean Albums (Gaon)	43

== Sales and certifications ==
Region	Sales amount
Japan	39,619
South Korea	263,577
Taiwan	10,000

== Release history ==
Region	Date	Format	Distributing label	Ref.
Worldwide	September 15, 2012	Digital download	YG Entertainment	
South Korea	September 18, 2012	CD	YG Entertainment; KT Music	
Taiwan	October 12, 2012	CD	Warner Music Taiwan	
Philippines	December 15, 2012	CD	Universal Records	
