= One of a Kind (TV series) =

- Genre: Children's television
- Country of origin: Canada
- Original language: English
- No. of seasons: 1

Production
- Executive producer: Ray Hazzan
- Running time: 30 minutes

Original release
- Network: CBC Television
- Release: 6 January – 31 March 1978

One of a Kind is a Canadian children's television series that aired on CBC Television in 1978.

== Premise ==
This series featured various productions for children including "Another Kind of Friendship" (Rebecca Yates and Glen Salzman producers), "The Mitt" (Michael Brownstone producer), "Monsters and other Scary Things" (Sandy Lane producer) and "Ranger Ryder and the Calgary Kid in the Adventure of the Dinosaur Badlands" (Don Elder producer and director).

== Scheduling ==
The series was broadcast Fridays at 4:00 p.m. (Eastern) from 6 January to 31 March 1978.
