= One of a Kind (G-Dragon song) =

Promotional single by G-Dragon

from the EP One of a Kind
- Released: August 24, 2012
- Genre: Hip hop
- Length: 3:26
- Label: YG Entertainment
- Composers: G-Dragon; Choice37
- Lyricist: G-Dragon

Music video
- One of a Kind on YouTube

"One of a Kind" is a song by South Korean rapper G-Dragon. It was released through YG Entertainment on August 24, 2012, as a promotional single from his extended play of the same name. Written solely by G-Dragon, the rapper also worked with long-time collaborator Choice37 to produce the music. The song was well received by music critics, that considered it one of his best work and one of the most influential Korean hip hop tracks. "One of a Kind" peaked at number nine on the Gaon Digital Chart in South Korea.

== Composition and reception ==
A hip hop song, the lyrics discuss "cheeky" themes such as money and fame. David Jeffries of Allmusic deemed the track as "a bright, boastful number with a hooky chorus and plenty of exciting production tricks". Billboard named "One of a Kind" the seventeenth best K-pop song of 2012, praising the "knocking hip-hop beat that today's biggest rappers would kill for" and how G-Dragon "showed off his impressive knack for flow and lyrics". Web portal Daum named the single the fifth best Korean song of the year, calling it a "masterpiece" and its composition "outstanding".

Korean music critic Kim Bong-hyun included "One of a Kind" in his book of most influential Korean hip hop songs from 1989 to 2016, naming it one of the 28 tracks that shaped the genre. "One of a Kind" was also the only song by a solo artist to be included in The Dong-A Ilbo's 2016 list of the best male idol songs in the past 20 years. Ize magazine listed "One of a Kind" as one of the most memorable songs written by G-Dragon, commenting that it raised his status as a hip-hop musician.

Commercially, the song became the fifth track from the album to peak within Gaon Digital Chart's top ten, when it rose to number nine in its second week, after a debut at number 21. The track earned him the Best Hip Hop / Rap Song of the Year awards from the Korean Music Awards and the Rhythmer Awards.

== Music video ==
The music video for "One of a Kind" preceded the album, being released on YouTube on August 25, 2012, marking his first solo release since Heartbreaker (2009). Directed by Seo Hyun Seung, the video was described as "autobiographical" and "glittered with designer items." G-Dragon is seen wearing outfits that he has worn in previous music videos. Fellow Big Bang member, Taeyang makes an appearance. David Bevan of Spin called it "a dazzling clip" for the "undeniable pop-rap juggernaut" track. Stereogum named "One of a Kind" the best music video of the week, with Tom Breihan commenting that "[I]f you don't have a baby tiger on a leash or a dancing bear cub in your video, you lost. Sometimes, it's just that simple. K-pop has discovered skate-rap, and we should all be very, very excited about that." Fuse called it one of G-Dragon's "must-see videos", noting that the "Explicit Content" reinterpreted sticker is "one of his most memorable looks".

== Chart performance and sales ==
Chart (2012)	Peak position
South Korea (Gaon)	9
South Korea (K-pop Hot 100)	14
US World Digital Song Sales (Billboard)	7

=== Sales ===
Chart	Sales
South Korea (digital)	777,782

== Awards ==
Year	Award-Giving Body	Category	Result	Ref.
2012	HipHopPlaya Awards	Music Video of the Year	Won	
2013	Korean Music Awards	Song of the Year	Nominated	
2013	Korean Music Awards	Best Rap/Hip Hop Song	Won	
2013	Rhythmer Awards	Best Hip Hop Song of The Year	Won	
