= That XX =

Single by G-Dragon

from the EP One of a Kind
- Released: September 1, 2012
- Recorded: 2012
- Genre: K-pop; acoustic
- Length: 3:19
- Label: YG Entertainment
- Songwriters: G-Dragon; Teddy Park; Seo Won-jin
- Producers: G-Dragon; Park; Seo

G-Dragon singles chronology
"I Need a Girl" (2010)	"That XX" (2012)	"Crayon" (2012)

Music video
- "That XX" on YouTube

"That XX" (Korean: 그 XX; RR: Geu XX) is a song by South Korean rapper G-Dragon. It was released on September 1, 2012, as the lead single of his first extended play One of a Kind (2012).

== Background and promotion ==
"That XX" was released as the first digital single and second music video from One of a Kind. The song was labelled unsuitable for listeners below 19 years of age for its explicit lyrics. Compromised words were replaced by beeps in the music video. After its release, the song ranked first place in all of South Korea's major music charts and on the weekly iChart on Instiz, achieving a 'Perfect All-Kill." "That XX" reached the top of the Gaon Chart for the month of September. This is the first time a 19+ song has reached the number 1 spot. The only televised live performance was made on the music show Inkigayo with guitarist Sungha Jung. G-Dragon performed a revised version fit for broadcast television.

== Music video ==
The music video for "That XX" was uploaded to BigBang's official YouTube channel on September 1, 2012. It was directed by Han Sa-min, who had previously directed the videos for BigBang's "Love Song" and labelmate 2NE1's "Lonely". The video features G-Dragon playing two characters: himself, and a cheating boyfriend of a female character played by Jennie Kim, who later debuted as part of Blackpink. The music video received three million views in just two days. As of September 2021, the music video has over 96 million views on YouTube.

== Cover versions ==
"That XX" was remade by the rappers Olltii and Zico at the reality show Show Me the Money. This rendition peaked at number #32 on the Gaon Digital Chart. Wonder Girls' Park Ye-eun and the duo 15& remade the song by giving it a female perspective at the survival show Singer Game. Mamamoo's Solar performed a cover at the TV show Duet Song Festival.

== Track listing ==
- Digital download / streaming
1. "That XX" – 3:20

== Chart performance ==
Chart (2012)	Peak position
South Korea (Gaon Digital Chart)	1
South Korea (K-pop Hot 100)	2

== Sales ==
Country	Sales
South Korea (digital)	1,898,895
