= Three of a Kind =

Three of a kind may refer to:

- Three of a kind (poker), a type of poker hand

== Television ==
- Three of a Kind (1967 TV series), a British comedy sketch and music show
- Three of a Kind (1981 TV series), a BBC comedy sketch show
- "Three of a Kind" (The X-Files), an episode of the television series The X-Files
- "Three of a Kind", an episode of the television series Comedy Connections
- "Three of a Kind", an episode of the television series Kelly
- "Three of a Kind", an episode of the television series Man About the House

== Film ==
- Three of a Kind (1925 film), an American silent crime film
- Three of a Kind (1926 film), a film from the Ton of Fun series
- Three of a Kind (1936 film), an American comedy film
- Three of a Kind (1944 film), an American comedy film about two vaudeville performers
- Three of a Kind (2004 film), a Hong Kong comedy film

== Other uses ==
- Three of a Kind (album), a 1998 album by Rob Agerbeek
- 3 of a Kind (group), a British garage act
- Three of a Kind (novella collection), a collection of novellas by James M. Cain including Double Indemnity
