= 1988 in heavy metal music =

This is an article about the events of heavy metal in the year 1988.

== Events ==
- Living Colour's debut album Vivid peaks at #6 on the Billboard 200, due to the success of the Top 20 single "Cult of Personality". The album is certified platinum twice.
- The Monsters of Rock tour plays across the U.S., featuring Metallica, Van Halen, Scorpions, Dokken, and Kingdom Come.
- Kai Hansen leaves Helloween due to conflict within the band and troubles with the record company. He later forms the band Gamma Ray.
- The Decline of Western Civilization II: The Metal Years is released.
- Mötley Crüe enter rehab.
- Billy Sheehan leaves David Lee Roth's solo band and forms Mr. Big, along with Racer X guitarist Paul Gilbert, vocalist Eric Martin and drummer Pat Torpey.
- Suicidal Tendencies sign to Epic Records and release their highly successful third album How Will I Laugh Tomorrow When I Can't Even Smile Today, featuring one of their famous songs "Trip at the Brain", which earned airplay on radio stations and MTV.
- Glacier release their four-song EP on cassette, featuring guest vocalist, Tim Lachman of fellow Portland band, Gargoyle. His younger brother, Pat Lachman, later played guitar in Halford and was lead vocalist for Damageplan with Dimebag Darrell and Vinnie Paul, both formerly of Pantera.
- Chuck Mosley is fired from Faith No More and is replaced by Mr. Bungle vocalist Mike Patton.

== Newly formed bands ==
- 16volt
- Abramelin
- Acheron
- The Almighty
- Amon Amarth (known as Scum until 1992)
- Anal Cunt
- Ancient Rites
- Asphalt Ballet
- Asrai
- Atrox
- Axxis
- Babylon A.D.
- Badlands
- Bang Tango
- The Big F
- Bombarder
- Broken Hope
- Cadaver
- Cancer
- Cannibal Corpse
- Carbonized
- Carnage
- Circle of Dust
- Cold as Life
- Convulse
- Cripple Bastards
- Cryptopsy
- Deftones
- Depressive Age
- Desaster
- Desperado
- Dismember
- Divididos
- Dizzy Mizz Lizzy
- Electric Boys
- Epizod
- Expulsion
- Eyehategod
- Fudge Tunnel
- God Macabre
- Goreaphobia
- Inquisition
- Integrity
- Iron Man
- Kik Tracee
- Killing Time
- Kong
- La Renga
- Mägo de Oz
- Mother Love Bone
- Mr. Big
- Naked City
- Nine Inch Nails
- Nirvana 2002
- Nitro
- Opera IX
- Paradise Lost
- Psychotic Waltz
- Pungent Stench
- Rhino Bucket
- Sacred Warrior
- Saigon Kick
- Sam Black Church
- Shihad
- Sinister
- The Smashing Pumpkins
- Soilent Green
- Solitude Aeturnus
- Sorcerer
- Soziedad Alkoholika
- Suffocation
- Tad
- Threshold
- Tin Machine
- Unanimated
- Unholy
- Vital Remains
- White Skull
- Winter
- Xysma

== Albums and EPs ==
- AC/DC – Blow Up Your Video
- ADX – Exécution Publique
- Acid Reign – Moshkinstein (EP)
- Acrophet – Corrupt Minds
- Agony – The First Defiance
- Anacrusis – Suffering Hour
- Angel Dust – To Dust Will You Decay
- Anthem – Gypsy Ways
- Anthrax – State of Euphoria
- Anvil – Pound for Pound
- Apocalypse – Apocalypse
- Apocrypha – The Eyes of Time
- Artch – Another Return (to Church Hill)
- Armored Saint – Saints Will Conquer (live)
- Atrophy – Socialized Hate
- Attacker – Second Coming
- At War – Retaliatory Strike
- Barren Cross – Atomic Arena
- Battle Bratt – Battle Bratt
- Bathory – Blood Fire Death
- Jason Becker – Perpetual Burn
- Beowülf – Lost My Head... But I'm Back on the Right Track
- Black 'n Blue – In Heat
- Blind Guardian – Battalions of Fear
- Blind Illusion – The Sane Asylum
- Bloodgood – Rock in a Hard Place
- Bloodlust – Terminal Velocity (EP)
- Bolt Thrower – In Battle There Is No Law
- Brainfever – You (EP)
- Britton – Rock Hard
- Brocas Helm – Black Death
- Bullet Boys – Bullet Boys
- Cacophony – Go Off!
- Candlemass – Ancient Dreams
- Carcass – Reek of Putrefaction
- Celtic Frost – Cold Lake
- China – China
- Chyld – Conception
- Chrome Molly – Angst
- Cloven Hoof – Dominator
- Coroner – Punishment for Decadence
- Crimson Glory – Transcendence
- Cryptic Slaughter – Stream of Consciousness
- Danzig – Danzig
- Dark Lord – It's Nigh' Time
- D.C. Lacroix – Livin' by the Sword
- Deadly Blessing – Ascend from the Cauldron
- Death – Leprosy
- Death Angel – Frolic Through the Park
- Despair – History of Hate
- Destiny – Atomic Winter
- Destruction – Release from Agony
- Paul Di'Anno's Battlezone – Warchild (comp)
- Dirty Blonde – Dirty Blonde (EP)
- Dirty Looks – Cool from the Wire
- D.R.I. – 4 of a Kind
- Drive – Characters in Time
- Earthshaker – Smash
- Europe – Out of this World
- Exciter – Exciter, a.k.a. O.T.T.
- Fastway – On Target
- Fates Warning – No Exit
- Femme Fatale – Femme Fatale
- Flotsam and Jetsam – No Place for Disgrace
- Frehley's Comet – Live+1 (EP)
- Frehley's Comet – Second Sighting
- Marty Friedman – Dragon's Kiss
- Forbidden – Forbidden Evil
- Gargoyle – Gargoyle
- Genocide (Jap) – Black Sanctuary
- Girlschool – Take a Bite
- Godflesh – "Godflesh (1988)"
- Grinder – Dawn for the Living
- Gwar – Hell-O
- Hades – If at First You Don't Succeed...
- Hellion – Postcards from the Asylum (EP)
- Helloween – Keeper of the Seven Keys: Part II
- Helstar – A Distant Thunder
- Hexx – Quest for Sanity (EP)
- Hittman – Hittman
- Hobbs' Angel of Death – Hobbs' Angel of Death
- Holocross – Holocross
- Holy Terror – Mind Wars
- House of Lords – House of Lords
- Greg Howe – Greg Howe
- Hydra Vein – Rather Death Than False of Faith
- Impellitteri – Stand in Line
- Iron Maiden – Seventh Son of a Seventh Son
- Jailhouse – Jailhouse
- Jane's Addiction – Nothing's Shocking
- Jetboy – Feel the Shake
- Judas Priest – Ram It Down
- Killer Dwarfs – Big Deal
- King Diamond – Them
- King Kobra – King Kobra III
- Kingdom Come – Kingdom Come
- Kingpin – Welcome to Bop City
- King's X – Out of the Silent Planet
- Kiss – Smashes, Thrashes & Hits (comp)
- KIX – Blow My Fuse
- Krokus – Heart Attack
- Kuni – Lookin' for Action
- L.A. Guns – L.A. Guns
- Liege Lord – Master Control
- Lillian Axe – Lillian Axe
- Living Colour – Vivid
- Lord – The Second Coming
- Loudness – Jealousy (EP)
- M-16 – Locked and Loaded
- Magnum – Wings of Heaven
- Yngwie Malmsteen – Odyssey
- Manilla Road – Out of the Abyss
- Manowar – Kings of Metal
- Frank Marino & Mahogany Rush – Double Live
- Masi – Downtown Dreamers
- Meanstreak – Roadkill
- Megadeth – So Far, So Good... So What!
- Megaton (MX) - Megatón (LP)
- Mekong Delta – The Music of Erich Zann
- Meliah Rage - Kill To Survive
- Metal Massacre – Metal Massacre IX (Compilation, various artists)
- Metallica – ...And Justice for All
- Michael W. Smith – I 2 (EYE)
- Ministry – The Land of Rape and Honey
- Vinnie Moore – Time Odyssey
- Motörhead – Nö Sleep at All (live)
- Napalm Death – From Enslavement to Obliteration
- Nasty Savage – Abstract Reality (EP)
- Neon Cross – Neon Cross
- Nuclear Assault – Survive
- Odin – Fight for Your Life
- OLD – Old Lady Drivers
- Opprobrium – Serpent Temptation (as Incubus)
- Overkill – Under the Influence
- Ozzy Osbourne – No Rest for the Wicked
- Pantera – Power Metal
- Pariah – The Kindred
- Pestilence – Malleus Maleficarum
- Poison – Open Up & Say... Ahh!
- Precious Metal – That Kind of Girl
- Prophet – Cycle of the Moon
- Prowler – Prowling Death Squad (EP)
- Queensrÿche – Operation: Mindcrime
- Racer X – Extreme Volume Live
- Rage – Perfect Man
- Raven – Nothing Exceeds Like Excess
- Razor – Violent Restitution
- Realm – Endless War
- Rigor Mortis – Rigor Mortis
- Riot – Thundersteel
- Risk – The Daily News
- Rock City Angels – Young′s Man Blues
- David Lee Roth – Skyscraper
- Roxx Gang – Things Youve Never Done Before
- Running Wild – Port Royal
- Running Wild – Ready for Boarding (live)
- Sacred Warrior – Rebellion
- Sadus – Illusions
- Saint – Too Late for Living
- Saint Vitus – Mournful Cries
- Samael – Medieval Prophecy (EP)
- Sanctuary – Refuge Denied
- S.A. Slayer – Go for the Throat
- Savage Steel – Do or Die
- Saxon – Destiny
- Scanner – Hypertrace
- Scorpions – Savage Amusement
- Screamer – Target: Earth
- Seduce – Too Much, Ain't Enough
- Shok Paris – Concrete Killers
- Sieges Even – Life Cycle
- Slayer – South of Heaven
- Sodom – Mortal Way of Live (live)
- Soldier - Babylon
- Steel Fury – Lesser of Two Evils
- Stone – Stone
- Stryper – In God We Trust
- Suicidal Tendencies – How Will I Laugh Tomorrow When I Can't Even Smile Today
- Suicide Squad – Live It While You Can (EP)
- Sword – Sweet Dreams
- Sye – Winds of Change
- Tankard – The Morning After
- Testament – The New Order
- Tormentor – Anno Domini
- Toxik – World Circus
- Trust – Live – Paris By Night
- 220 Volt – Eye to Eye
- Tyrant (Ger) – Ruling the World
- The Unsane – Inverted Crosses (EP)
- V2 – V2
- Van Halen – OU812
- Vendetta (Ger) – Brain Damage
- Vengeance Rising – Human Sacrifice
- Vicious Rumors – Digital Dictator
- Victory – That's Live
- Vinnie Vincent Invasion – All Systems Go
- Vio-lence – Eternal Nightmare
- Virgin Steele – Age of Consent
- Voivod – Dimension Hatröss
- Vow Wow – Vibe, a.k.a. Helter Skelter
- VXN – The Question
- Warfare – A Conflict of Hatred
- Wargasm – Why Play Around?
- Wrathchild – The Biz Suxx
- X Japan – Vanishing Vision
- Zed Yago – From Over Yonder
- Zero Nine – Voodoo You
- Znöwhite – Act of God
- Zodiac Mindwarp – Tattooed Beat Messiah

== Disbandments ==
- Warlock

| Preceded by 1987 | Heavy Metal Timeline; 1988 | Succeeded by 1989 |
