= If =

If most often means:

- If (preposition), used in English conditional sentences
- If (subordinator), used for English subordinate interrogative clauses

If or IF may also refer to:

== Arts and entertainment ==
=== Film, drama, and television ===
- If...., a 1968 film starring Malcolm McDowell
- IF (film), a 2024 fantasy film about imaginary friends
- If (play), 1921, by Lord Dunsany
- If... (TV series), a series of BBC drama-documentaries
- "If..." (Desperate Housewives), a 2010 episode of Desperate Housewives

=== Gaming ===
- IF, a character in the Hyperdimension Neptunia game series
- Interactive fiction, text-based computer games featuring interactive stories and environments
- Shin Megami Tensei If..., a 1994 video game in the Shin Megami Tensei series
- Kill la Kill the Game: IF, a 2019 video game based on the Kill la Kill anime

=== Literature ===
- If (magazine), subtitled "Worlds of Science Fiction"
- IF Magazine, Inside Film, Australian magazine, known for IF Awards
- If... (comic), a political comic strip which appears in the UK newspaper The Guardian
- "If—" (published 1910), a poem by Rudyard Kipling
- The laconic phrase "If", a Spartan reply to a threat by Philip II

=== Music ===
==== Albums ====
- If (Glass Hammer album), 2010
- If (If album), 1970
- if (Mindless Self Indulgence album), 2008
- (if), by Diary of Dreams, 2009
- If..., by Bill Ryder-Jones, 2011
- If…, by Scorpio Rising, 1992

==== Songs ====
- "If..." (The Bluetones song), 1998
- "If" (Bread song), 1971, covered by many artists, including a UK #1 by Telly Savalas in 1975
- "If" (Davido song), 2017
- "If" (French Kiss song), 2011
- "If" (Glasvegas song), 2013
- "If" (Janet Jackson song), 1993
- "If" (Kana Nishino song), 2010
- "If" (Pink Floyd song), 1970
- "If (Mata Aetara)", by Day6, 2018
- "If (They Made Me a King)", written by Tolchard Evans, Robert Hargreaves and Stanley J. Damerell, 1934; notably recorded by Perry Como, 1950
- "If", by Jeri Lynne Fraser (as Jeri Lynn), 1959
- "If", by Femme Fatale from Femme Fatale, 1988
- "If", by The Cult from Ceremony, 1991
- "If", by Joe Satriani from his 1995 self-titled album
- "If...", by The Divine Comedy from A Short Album About Love, 1997
- "If", by Bananarama from Exotica, 2001
- "If", by Destiny's Child from Destiny Fulfilled, 2004
- "If", by Red Hot Chili Peppers from Stadium Arcadium, 2006
- "If", by Freemasons from Unmixed, 2007
- "If", by Joni Mitchell from Shine, 2007
- "If", by R5 from New Addictions, 2017

==== Performers ====
- If (band), 1970s British progressive jazz-rock band
- In Flames, a melodic death metal band from Sweden, and a song from their album Lunar Strain
- I-F, stage name of Ferenc E. van der Sluijs, a Dutch producer and DJ

== Business and organizations ==
- If (insurance company), in the Nordic countries
- IF Metall, a trade union in Sweden
- Illuminati Films, an Indian motion picture production, based in Mumbai
- Independent Fabrication, a bicycle manufacturer
- Intelligent Finance, a bank
- Interflug (1958–1991; IATA airline designator IF)
- International Federation, any of several world sport governing bodies
- International Forum Design (iF), a society best known for its iF design awards
- Islamic Front (Syria), Sunni Islamist rebel group involved in the Syrian Civil War
- Islas Airways (founded 2002; IATA airline designator IF)

== Science and technology ==
=== Biology and medicine ===
- I_{f} current, a component current in the cardiac pacemaker potential
- Immunofluorescence, a form of labeling substances with fluorescent antibodies
- Initiation factor, an important component in protein synthesis
- Intermediate filament, a component of the cytoskeleton
- Interstitial fluid, the liquid outside of a cell
- Intrinsic factor, produced by the stomach

=== Computing and mathematics ===
- If-then-else, a conditional statement in computer programming
- IF (x86 flag), the Interrupt Flag in the x86 processor architecture
- Information filter, or inverse covariance filter, in Kalman filtering
- Interface (computing), a shared boundary across which components of a computer system exchange information
- Intermediate form, a type of data structure in computer programming
- Infinity Fabric

=== Other uses in science and technology ===
- Information filtering system, which removes redundant or unwanted information at a semantic level
- Intelligent falling, a satirical "alternative theory" of gravitation
- Intermediate frequency, in radio transmission or reception
- Internal focusing, a lens technology in which focusing occurs only with internal elements
- Iodine monofluoride, an unstable interhalogen inorganic compound
- International Fujita scale (IF-scale), a scale to rate a tornado's intensity

== Other uses ==
- If, a small island in the Bay of Marseille, France; location of the Château d'If
- Impact factor, a measure reflecting the average number of citations to articles published in scholarly journals
- Intellectual freedom, a right to access, explore, consider, and express ideas and information
- Intermittent fasting, a diet having recurring periods of fasting
- Internally Flawless, a grade of diamond clarity
- Inside forward, a position in association football
- Ilfov County (except Bucharest), on the vehicle registration plates of Romania

== See also ==
- If and only if, iff, logical statement indicating necessary and sufficient conditions
- IFF (disambiguation)
- IFS (disambiguation)
