= Iffs =

Iffs or IFFS may refer to:

- Les Iffs (French: The Iffs), Ille-et-Vilaine, Brittany, France; a commune
- Institute for Futures Studies, Swedish government secretariat
- International Federation of Film Societies (IFFS; French: Fédération Internationale des Ciné-Clubs; FICC), the film society international federation
- Instituto Filosófico de São Francisco de Sales (IFFS, Portuguese: Philosophical Institute of Saint Francis de Sales), Dili, Timor-Leste; a private university in Timor-Leste

== See also ==
- Saint-Brieuc-des-Iffs (French: Saint Brioc of Iffs), Ille-et-Vilaine, Brittany, France; a commune
- IFF (disambiguation) for the singular of IFFs
- IFS (disambiguation)
