= Filippians (disambiguation) =

Filippians may refer to one of the following:

- Filippians, a sect of Old Believers
- Philippians, i.e., the Epistle to the Philippians

== See also ==
- Republic of the Philippines in the Western Pacific, and its Filipino people.
