= IIF =

IIF may refer to:

- IIf (abbreviation for immediate if) and ?:, the inline-if computing function
- Indirect immunofluorescence, one of several types of immunofluorescence
- Institute of International Finance, an association of international financial institutions
- International Indonesia Forum, an organisation which holds annual interdisciplinary seminars in Indonesia.
- International Institute of Forecasters, a nonprofit organization devoted to advancing the science of forecasting
- Intuit Interchange Format, a file format used by Intuit's Quickbooks software

== See also ==
- IFF (disambiguation)
