= IF2 =

IF2 may refer to:

- Bacterial initiation factor 2 (IF-2)
- IF2 on the International Fujita scale, a tornado rating
- Interceptor Force 2, a 2002 science fiction television film
- If 2, a 1970 album by If

== See also ==
- Eutelsat I F-2, a defunct communications satellite also called European Communications Satellite 2 (ECS-2)
- International Foundation for Internal Freedom (IFIF)
- IFF (disambiguation)
- IF (disambiguation)
