= Terrion =

Terrion may refer to:

- Terrion Arnold (born 2003), American football player
- Terrion Ware (born 1986), American mixed martial artist
- Greg Terrion (1960–2018), Canadian National Hockey League player
- Sean Terrion, a character in the TV series Bosch
- Terrion, a Russian tractor manufacturer - see List of tractor manufacturers
- "Terrion", a track on the 1988 album Hypertrace by the German power metal band Scanner
