= IFF =

IFF, Iff or iff may refer to:

== People and characters ==
=== People ===
- Claude Iff (born 1946), Swiss footballer
- Simone Iff (1924-2014), French political activist

=== Characters ===
- Iff of the Unpronounceable Name, a character in The Riddle-Master trilogy by Patricia A. McKillip
- Simon Iff, a character by Aleister Crowley

== Arts, entertainment, media ==
- International film festival, a type of film festival
- Indonesian Film Festival, an annual film festival in Indonesia
- Ischia Film Festival, an annual film festival held on the island of Ischia, Italy
- Inferno, Flame, and Flint, a software by Autodesk Media and Entertainment
- "IFF", an episode of The Expanse

== Mathematics, science, engineering, technology ==
- Identification friend or foe, an electronic radio-based identification system for the military
- If and only if, a biconditional logical connective between statements, where either both statements are true or both are false
- Iff card, a smart card used on bus services in Cardiff, Wales, United Kingdom
- Interchange File Format, a computer file format

== Organizations ==
=== Sports organizations ===
- International Fencing Federation (Fédération Internationale d'Escrime or FIE), the international governing body for fencing
- International Floorball Federation, the global governing body for the sport of floorball
- Irish Fencing Federation, the governing body for fencing in Ireland

=== Other organizations ===
- Iff Books, an imprint of John Hunt Publishing
- Independent Fianna Fáil, a political party in Ireland
- Institute For Figuring, an organization that promotes the public understanding of the poetic and aesthetic dimensions of science, mathematics and the technical arts
- International Federation of Factory Workers, former trade union international
- International Flavors & Fragrances, an American corporation which produces flavors and fragrances
- International Freedom Foundation, a self-described anti-communist group established in Washington, D.C.
- Fakultät für Interdisziplinäre Forschung und Fortbildung (Faculty for Interdisciplinary Research and Continuing Education), a faculty of the Austrian University of Klagenfurt
- Internet Freedom Foundation, an Indian digital rights advocacy organisation

== Other uses ==
- Illicit financial flows, a concept in economics and finance related to resources that are of illegal origin, use or transfer
- International Finance Facility, proposed by HM Treasury in conjunction with the Department for International Development of the United Kingdom
- International freight forwarder, an individual or company that books or otherwise arranges space for shipments between countries via common carriers
- Utaha language (ISO 639 language code iff), also known as Ifo, an extinct language from Erromango, Vanuatu
- Institut de formation ferroviaire, a Moroccan vocational training institution specializing in professions related to rail transport

== See also ==
- If (disambiguation)
- IIF (disambiguation)
- Iffs
- IF2
