= English subordinators =

Subordinators in the English language

English subordinators (also known as subordinating conjunctions or complementizers) are words that mostly mark clauses as subordinate. The subordinators form a closed lexical category in English and include whether; and, in some of their uses, if, that, for, arguably to, and marginally how.

Syntactically, they appear immediately before the subordinate element. Semantically, they tend to be empty.

== Terminology and membership ==
Peter Matthews defines subordinator as "a word, etc. which marks a clause as subordinate." Most dictionaries and many traditional grammar books use the term subordinating conjunction and include a much larger set of words, most of them prepositions such as before, when, and though that take clausal complements. The generative grammar tradition uses the term complementizer, a term which sometimes excludes the prepositions.

== Membership ==
The subordinators are whether; and, in some of their uses, if, that, for, arguably to, and marginally how.

=== Whether ===
Whether is always a subordinator. It marks closed interrogative content clauses such as I wonder whether this would work. It is often possible to substitute if for whether, the main exceptions being when the subordinate clause functions as the subject, as in Whether it's true is an empirical question and cases with or not, such as I'll be there whether you are there or not.

=== If ===
If is a subordinator when it marks closed interrogative content clauses such as I wonder if this would work. It is always possible to substitute whether for subordinator if. Where such substitution is not possible, if is instead a preposition, usually with a meaning that is usually conditional but sometimes concessive (They were jubilant, if exhausted, etc).

=== That ===
That is a subordinator when it marks declarative content clauses such as I think that this would work and in relative clauses such as the fact that he was there. In contexts where it could be contrasted with this, it is a determiner. (Note: In the terminology of The Cambridge Grammar of the English Language (which reserves the name "determiner" for a function), it is a determinative.)

=== For ===
For is a subordinator only when it marks infinitival clauses having a subject such as for this to happen (in which this is the subject). In sentences like "I shall not be imprisoned unjustly, for I have rights", it is instead a preposition.

=== To ===
To is arguably a subordinator when it marks infinitival verb phrases such as To be sure, we'd have to double check (but a preposition in I went to Peoria). If it is a subordinator then it is the only one that marks a verb phrase, not a clause, as subordinate.

=== How ===
How is a marginal subordinator only when it marks finite clauses such as She told him how it wasn't fun any more. Note that that could substitute for how in this example. Elsewhere how is an adverb or occasionally (as in How are you?) an adjective.

Various linguists, including Geoffrey K. Pullum, Paul Postal and Richard Hudson, and Robert Fiengo have suggested that to in cases like I want to go is an acutely defective auxiliary verb: one with no tensed forms. Rodney Huddleston argues against this position in The Cambridge Grammar of the English Language, but Robert Levine counters these arguments. Bettelou Los calls Pullum's arguments that to is an auxiliary verb "compelling".

== Subordinators vs other categories ==
=== Subordinators vs prepositions ===
Traditional grammar includes in its class of "subordinating conjunctions" prepositions like because, while, and unless, which take a clausal complement. But since at least Otto Jespersen (see English prepositions for the historical development of the idea) most modern grammarians distinguish these two categories based on whether they add meaning to the sentence or are purely functional. The distinction can be shown with if, since there is a subordinator if and a preposition if. The preposition is needed to express a meaning, usually conditional (e.g., If it works, that's great). Subordinators, though, have no meaning. They just mark a clause as subordinate; there is no difference in meaning between I know that you were there and I know you were there. Similarly, in She asked if we were there the subordinator if merely marks the following clause as a closed interrogative content clause, without contributing anything to a conditional, concessive, or other meaning.
