= Shoot Me: Youth Part 1 =

- Digital cover

EP by Day6
- Released: June 26, 2018
- Genres: Pop rock; alternative rock
- Length: 20:50
- Language: Korean
- Labels: JYP; Studio J; Iriver
- Producers: J.Y. Park; DAY6; Hong Ji-sang; Lee Woo-min 'Collapsedone'

Day6 chronology
The Best Day (2018)	Shoot Me: Youth Part 1 (2018)	Unlock (2018)

Singles from Shoot Me: Youth Part 1
- 1. "Shoot Me" Released: June 26, 2018

Shoot Me: Youth Part 1 is the third extended play (EP) by South Korean band Day6, released through JYP Entertainment on June 26, 2018, featuring six tracks led by the eponymous lead single "Shoot Me".

== Background and release ==
On May 14, 2018, it was reported that Day6 will be returning with new music in June and their agency JYP Entertainment stated, "DAY6 is working on their new album, but the exact comeback timing has not been decided yet". On June 11, the agency dropped Day6's 'Schedule Announcement' and revealed that the band would release their third EP titled Shoot Me: Youth Part 1 on June 26.

Subsequently, from June 15 to June 19 motion posters and teaser images of each members were released, followed by unit teaser images on June 20.

On June 25, a teaser of the music video for "Shoot Me" was released on both JYP's official YouTube channel and the group's official V Live channel. On June 26, the EP was released, along with the music video for "Shoot Me".

== Composition ==
The title track is described by Billboard as "bombastic and full of punk rock vibes, with slinking synths thrown in for good measure which "builds itself up to precarious sonic peaks with the “bang bang” of the chorus and then dramatically settles down before working its way once again to a dynamic hook that is fronted by gritty chants."

== Promotion ==
On June 27, 2018, two hours after the album's release, a "Comeback Show" was broadcast live on Naver's V Live broadcasting site featuring Day6 presenting their new songs. Day6 promoted the title song "Shoot Me" on various music programs in South Korea including M Countdown and Music Bank.

== Track listing ==
No.	Title	Lyrics	Music	Arrangement	Length
1.	"Warning!"	Young K	Hong Ji-sang; Jae; Sungjin; Young K; Wonpil	Hong Ji-sang	3:25
2.	"Shoot Me"	Young K	Hong Ji-sang; Lee Woo-min `Collapsedone`; Jae; Sungjin; Young K; Wonpil	Hong Ji-sang; Lee Woo-min `Collapsedone`	2:55
3.	"어쩌다 보니" (Somehow)	Young K	Hong Ji-sang; Lee Woo-min `Collapsedone`; Jae; Sungjin; Young K; Wonpil	Hong Ji-sang; Lee Woo-min `Collapsedone`	3:22
4.	"Feeling Good"	Young K	Hong Ji-sang; Jae; Sungjin; Young K; Wonpil	Hong Ji-sang	3:25
5.	"혼잣말" (Talking to)	Jae; Young K	Hong Ji-sang; Jae; Young K; Wonpil	Hong Ji-sang	3:32
6.	"원하니까" (Still)	Young K	Hong Ji-sang; Lee Woo-min `Collapsedone`; Jae; Sungjin; Young K; Wonpil; Dowoon	Hong Ji-sang; Lee Woo-min `Collapsedone`	4:11
Total length:					20:50

Physical edition track
No.	Title	Music	Arrangement	Length
7.	"Shoot Me" (Instrumental)	Hong Ji-sang; Lee Woo-min `Collapsedone`; Jae; Sungjin; Young K; Wonpil	Hong Ji-sang; Lee Woo-min `Collapsedone`	2:56
Total length:				23:46

== Charts ==
Chart (2018)	Peak position
French Downloaded Albums (SNEP)	59
South Korean Albums (Gaon)	3
US World Albums (Billboard)	6

== Release history ==
Country	Date	Format	Label
South Korea	June 26, 2018	CD; digital download; streaming	JYP Entertainment; IRIVER
Worldwide	June 26, 2018	Digital download, streaming	JYP Entertainment; IRIVER
