= Shoot Me (song) =

Single by Day6

from the album Shoot Me: Youth Part 1
- Language: Korean
- Released: June 26, 2018
- Length: 2:57
- Label: JYP
- Composers: Young K; Wonpil; Sungjin; Hong Ji-sang; Lee Woo Min
- Lyricist: Young K

Day6 singles chronology
"I Like You" (2017)	"Shoot Me" (2018)	"Beautiful Feeling" (2018)

Music video
- "Shoot Me" on YouTube

"Shoot Me" is a song recorded by South Korean boy band Day6 for their third EP Shoot Me: Youth Part 1. It was released as the EP's lead single by JYP Entertainment on June 26, 2018.

== Background and release ==
On June 11, JYP Entertainment dropped Day6's 'Schedule Announcement' and revealed that the band would release their third EP titled Shoot Me: Youth Part 1 on June 26, seven months after their previous comeback.

Subsequently, from June 15 to June 19 motion posters and teaser images of each members were released, followed by unit teaser images on June 20. On June 26 Day6 released "Shoot Me".

== Composition ==
"Shoot Me" Is written by Young K and composed by Young K, Wonpil, Sungjin, Lee Woo Min and Homg Ji-sang. The song is composed in the key C-sharp Major and has 168 beats per minute and a running time of 2 minutes and 57 seconds. "Shoot Me", is characterized by leaving a strong afterglow with a deep and broad message. The lyrics that depict the moment when emotions become intense and shoot at each other are songs that make it possible to interpret various interpretations not only of love between lovers but also such as wounds and attacks in life.

== Promotion ==
Day6 held their first comeback stage for "Shoot Me" on Mnet's M Countdown on June 28 and promoted on several music programs in South Korea, including Inkigayo on June 30, Show! Music Core on July 7, 2018, and Show Champion on July 11, 2018.

== Awards and nominations ==
Awards and nominations for "Shoot Me"
Year	Organization	Award	Result	Ref.
2018	Genie Music Awards	Song of the Year	Nominated	
2018	Genie Music Awards	Band Music Award	Won	
2018	Mnet Asian Music Awards	Best Band Performance	Nominated	
2018	Mnet Asian Music Awards	Song of the Year	Nominated	

== Charts ==
Weekly chart performance
Chart (2018)	Peak position
US World Digital Songs (Billboard)	8

== Release history ==
Release history
Region	Date	Format	Label
Various	June 26, 2018	Digital download; streaming	JYP
