= Unlock (album) =

Studio album by Day6
- Released: October 17, 2018
- Genre: Pop rock; alternative rock
- Length: 37:12
- Language: Japanese
- Label: Warner Music Japan

Day6 chronology
Shoot Me: Youth Part 1 (2018)	Unlock (2018)	Remember Us: Youth Part 2 (2018)

Singles from Unlock
- 1. "If -Mata Aetara-" Released: March 14, 2018; 2. "Stop The Rain" Released: July 25, 2018; 3. "Breaking Down" Released: September 18, 2018

Unlock (stylized as UNLOCK) is the debut Japanese studio album by South Korean band Day6, which was released on October 17, 2018. The album features 10 tracks, including the singles If -Mata Aetara- and Stop The Rain. The album peaked at number 21 on Oricon Charts.

== Background and release ==
In January 2018, it was revealed that Day6 would make their Japanese debut with the release of the single "If -Mata Aetara-" on March 14. They released their second Japanese single album Stop the Rain, produced by Shinichi Ubukata, on July 25. Breaking Down was released along with a music video in September (one month prior the release of the album) as a promotional track.

Members Sungjin, Jae, Young K and Wonpil participated in the writing of the lyrics and all members, including Dowoon, participated in producing the tracks. The album only includes original songs as it does not feature Japanese versions of Day6's songs.

== Track listing ==
No.	Title	Writer(s)	Producer(s)	Length
1.	"Live Your Life"	Young K	Cha Il-hun; REX; Young K	3:08
2.	"Breaking Down"	Young K	Cha Il-hun; YUE; Young K	3:29
3.	"Stop The Rain"	Sungjin; Jae; Young K	Shinichi Ubukata; Day6	4:36
4.	"Say Hello"	Young K; Watanabe Hajime	220; Sungjin; Young K; Wonpil; Jae	3:23
5.	"Everybody Rock!"	Young K; Co-sho	Frants; Young K	3:15
6.	"I Just"	Young K; KOMU	Cha Il-hun; Young K; Wonpil	3:25
7.	"Nobody Knows"	Sungjin; Young K; Wonpil; KOMU; Frants	Frants; Sungjin	4:05
8.	"Falling"	Sungjin; Jae; Young K	Ubukata Shinichi; Day6	4:35
9.	"If ~また逢えたら~" (If -Mata Aetara-)	Young K; KOMU	Cha Il-hun; YUE; Sungjin; Young K; Wonpil	3:23
10.	"Baby, It's Okay"	Young K; YHANAEL	Hong Ji-sang; Min Lee "collapsedone"; Jae; Sungjin; Young K	3:53
Total length:				37:12

Limited edition DVD
No.	Title	Length
1.	"Breaking Down" (Music Video)
2.	"DAY6 JAPAN 1st ALBUM UNLOCK" (Making Video)
3.	"If -Mata Aetara-" (Music Video Another Ver.)
4.	"Stop The Rain" (Music Video Another Ver.)

== Editions ==
There are seven versions of this album available: the Regular Edition, the Limited Edition and five version of the Picture Label Edition.

- Regular Edition (WPCL-12947): This edition includes the CD and a 24-page booklet
- Limited Edition (WPZL-31524): This edition comes with a DVD and a 24-page booklet.
- Picture Label Edition: This edition includes the CD only.
  - Sungjin ver. (WPCL-12948)
  - Jae ver. (WPCL-12949)
  - Young K ver. (WPCL-12950)
  - Wonpil ver. (WPCL-12951)
  - Dowoon ver. (WPCL-12952)

== Charts ==
Chart (2018)	Peak position
Japan Hot Albums (Billboard)	21
Japanese Albums (Oricon)	23

== Sales ==
=== Album ===
Country	Digital sales
Japan (Oricon)	6,586

=== Singles ===
==== "If -Mata Aetara-" ====
Country	Digital sales
Japan (Oricon)	4,832

==== "Stop The Rain" ====
Country	Digital sales
Japan (Oricon)	1,198

== Release history ==
Country	Date	Format	Label	Ref.
Japan	October 17, 2018	CD, digital download	Warner Music Japan	
