= Mental Reservation (album) =

Studio album by Scanner
- Released: 1995
- Genre: Speed metal, power metal
- Length: 63:07
- Label: Massacre Records

Scanner chronology
Terminal Earth (1989)	Mental Reservation (1995)	Ball of the Damned (1997)

Mental Reservation is the third full-length album by the German power metal band Scanner. It was released in 1995 by Massacre Records.

== Track listing ==
No.	Title	Length
1.	"Break the Seal"	5:26
2.	"Upright Liar"	7:33
3.	"After the Storm"	4:37
4.	"Your Infallible Smile"	5:04
5.	"Conception of a Cure"	5:05
6.	"Into a Brave Man's Mind"	7:34
7.	"Out of Nowhere"	4:59
8.	"Nightmare"	3:47
9.	"Rubberman"	5:37
10.	"Wrong Lane Society"	5:45
11.	"20th Century Crusade"	7:40
Total length:		63:07

== Credits ==
- Axel A.J. Julius – guitar
- Leszek Szpigiel (as Haridon Lee) – vocals
- John A.B.C. Smith (aka Dario Trobok) – bass
- D.D. Bucco – drums

== Album information ==
Mental Reservation is a concept album. This means that the songs contain a story with characters and plot. The album's booklet contains the songs' lyrics plus a part of the story that each song narrates.

The main character of the story is Neil Legweak. He is one of the few survivors, if not the last one, of mankind. He writes down his memories about the past.

The story is about a young boy named Boris Jay who receives a crystal key from a dark creature. He uses the key and breaks the seal of hell. He returns to Earth as a young man equipped with the instruments of evil, and his political ambitions are immense. He soon rises to power and starts a world war. During this war our main character (Neil Legweak) loses his warrior sister. The war lasts three years and is devastating; one third of the Earth is contaminated. Boris is executed by his own generals. Our main character flees to a distant island only to face his nightmares again as creatures from the island's volcano gather the population and lead them into it. Our main character manages to escape and returns to a collapsed civilization. After a year he discovers that evil forces have found a new candidate for their purposes, Albert Twostone, who was one of the prisoners inside the volcano. Our character departs once again just before a new world war begins. He returns to the island where he decides to spend the rest of his days hoping one day to see other survivors return.

== Additional information ==
The band's leader Axel Julius has stated in an interview several years after the release of the album that the Balkan war was a heavy influence for him. He also stated that he believed there were many "Upright Liars" in today's political scene.
