= Too Late for Living =

Too Late For Living

Studio album by Saint
- Released: 1988
- Genre: Christian metal
- Length: 31:35
- Label: Pure Metal

Saint chronology
Time's End (1986)	Too Late For Living (1988)	The Perfect Life (1999)

Professional ratings
Review scores
Source	Rating
CCM Magazine	

Too Late For Living is the third album from the Christian metal band Saint.

== Track listing ==
1. "Too Late for Living" - 3:57
2. "Star Pilot" - 3:29
3. "Accuser" - 2:00
4. "The Rock" - 2:50
5. "On The Street" - 3:38
6. "Returning" - 4:48
7. "The Path" - 3:48
8. "Through the Sky" - 3:49
9. "The War is Over" - 3:16
