= Ernst Lohmeyer =

German theologian (1890–1946)

- Born: 7 August 1890; Dorsten (Westfalen)
- Died: 19 September 1946 (aged 56)

Academic background
- Education: Friedrich Wilhelm University in Berlin
- Thesis: Die Lehre vom Willen bei Anselm von Canterbury (1914)

Academic work
- Discipline: Biblical studies
- Sub-discipline: New Testament studies
- Institutions: University of Breslau
- Main interests: New Testament exegesis Pauline theology

Ernst Lohmeyer (8 July 1890 – 19 September 1946) was a German scholar of the New Testament, Protestant theologian and Bible professor, murdered by Soviet authorities occupying the former East Germany.

== Life ==
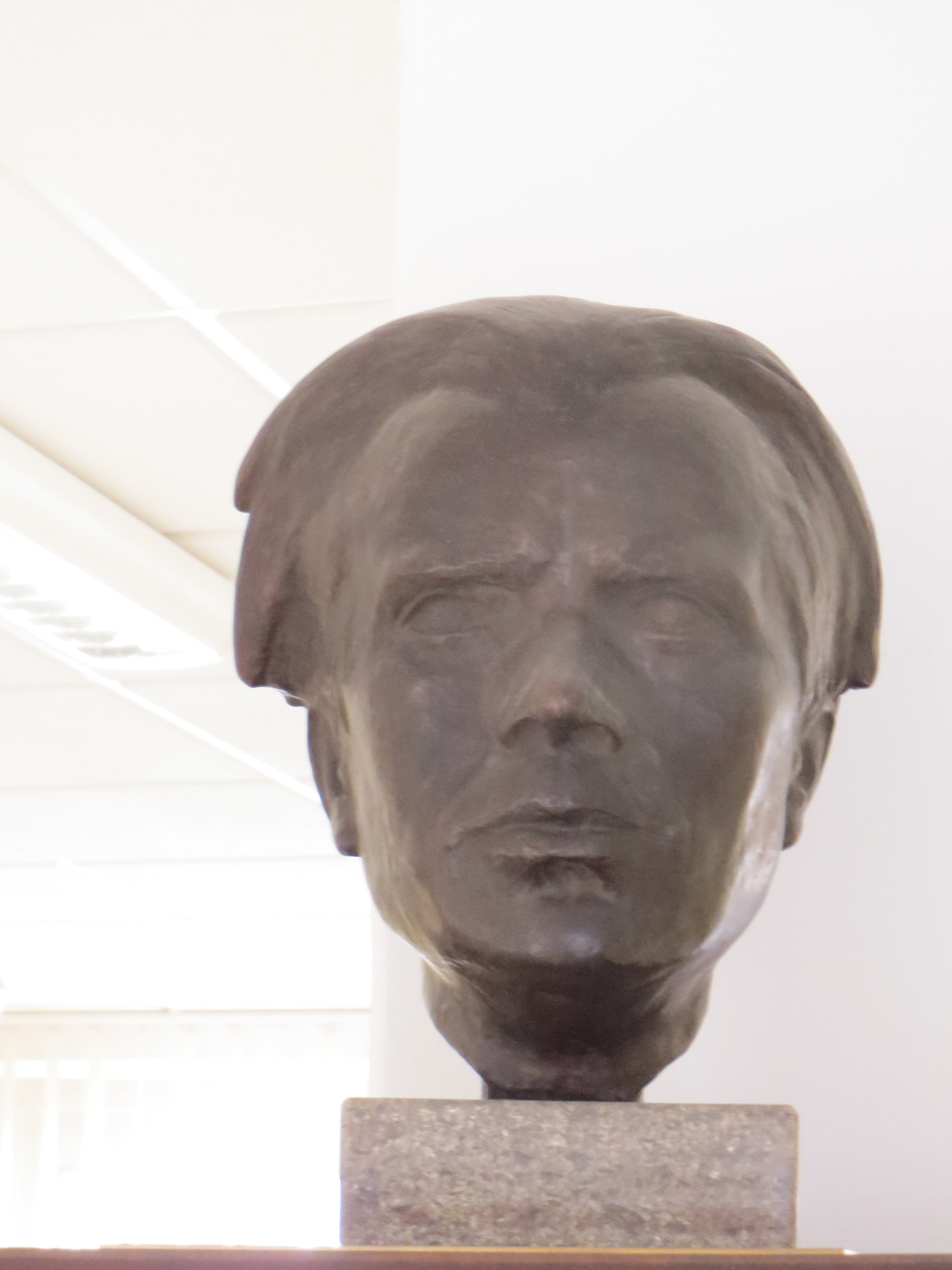
Bust of Lohmeyer by Theodor von Gosen, 1931

Ernst Lohmeyer was born on July 7, 1890, in Dorsten (Westfalen), as a son of parson, Carl Heinrich Ludwig Lohmeyer (1851–1918). On July 24, 1912, he wrote his bachelor's thesis on "Der Begriff der Diatheke in der antiken Welt und in der Griechischen Bibel". In 1914, he wrote a dissertation "Die Lehre vom Willen bei Anselm von Canterbury", for which he received a doctor of philology. After his army service between 1913 and 1918, he graduated in Heidelberg (1918) and was appointed Professor extraordinarius (1920), and Professor ordinarius (1921). He worked as professor of New Testament Theology at the University of Breslau (now Wrocław). He was rector of the university in 1930 and 1931.

Lohmeyer opposed the Nazis and all related fascist impulses within the German church and society from their onset in the early 1930s. He demonstrated his friendship and solidarity with Jewish professors Martin Buber and Jonas Cohn, in an era of strong antisemitism. Lohmeyer wrote to Martin Buber in 1933 that "the Christian faith is only Christian as long as it retains in its heart the Jewish faith". (Note: "Der christliche Glaube ist nur solange christlich, als er der jüdischen in seinem Herzen trägt". Andreas Köhn, Der Neutestamentler Ernst Lohmeyer: Studien zu Biographie und Theologie. Tübingen: Mohr Siebeck, 2004. p. 298.) In this period, his Evangelical Church of the old-Prussian Union, like other Protestant churches, was very quiet on the Jewish question. Gerhard Kittel even attacked Buber. On October 15, 1935, he was demoted from a professorship in prestigious Breslau to the relative backwater of Greifswald for his opposition to the Nazis.

During World War II, Lohmeyer served in the Wehrmacht. He became a military officer in the Netherlands and Belgium and on the German East front, on the territory of Poland, and Russia. He remained a Wehrmacht officer from 1939 to 1943 and distinguished himself by wise and courageous leadership and benevolent oversight of occupied areas. After the war, he was a natural choice for rector of the reconstituted University of Greifswald, where he had been a New Testament professor since 1935.

On February 15, 1946, Lohmeyer was arrested by the Soviet NKGB, at midnight and whisked away while his home was being ransacked before the eyes of his astonished wife. He vanished without a trace. His family knew no details for the next twelve years.

Lohmeyer's headstone

Lohmeyer was killed on September 19, 1946, while in Soviet custody. His death was officially confirmed on December 12, 1957. He was rehabilitated by the Russian government on August 15, 1996.

Lohmeyer published over three hundred items, among them monographs on New Testament ecclesiology, the Philippians-Colossians-Philemon corpus, the Gospel of Mark, New Testament history and backgrounds, the Book of Revelation, the relation between Old and New Testament traditions, the historical Jesus, eschatology, and Pauline theology. He interprets the Book of Revelation as a thoroughly eschatological book.

He was also the author of hundreds of works still unpublished.

== Works ==
- Diatheke. Ein Beitrag zur Klärung des neutestamentlichen Begriffs, UNT 2, 1913;
- Die Offenbarung des Johannes, HNT 16, 1926 (1953^{2}, 1970^{3});
- Die Lehre vom Willen bei Anselm von Canterbury, 1914;
- Christuskult und Kaiserkult, SGV 90, 1919;
- Vom göttl. Wohlgeruch, SHAW.PH 1919.9, 1919;
- Soziale Fragen im Urchristentum, Wissenschaft und Bildung - Einzeldarstellungen aus allen Gebieten des Wissens 172, 1921;
- Vom Begriff der religiösen Gemeinschaft, Wissenschaftl. Grundfragen (hrsg. v. Richard Hönigswald) 3, 1925;
- Kyrios Jesus. Eine Untersuchung zu Philipper 2,5-11, SHAW.PH 1927/28.4, 1928 (1961^{2});
- Die Briefe an die Philipper, Kolosser und an Philemon, KEK IX, 1928/30 (1953^{2}. Beiheft v. Werner Schmauch, 1964);
- Grundlagen paulinischer Theologie, BHTh 1, 1929;
- Glaube und Geschichte in den vorderorientalischen Religionen, 1931;
- Das Urchristentum I: Johannes der Täufer, 1932;
- Galiläa und Jerusalem, FRLANT 52, 1936 (1953^{2});
- Das Evangelium des Markus, KEK I,2, 1937 (1967^{8}. Ergänzungsheft v. Gerhard Saß, 1967^{3});
- Kultus und Evangelium, 1942;
- Stolz und Vorurteil, 1943;
- Gottesknecht und Davidsohn, SyBU 5, 1945 (FRLANT 61, 1953^{2});
- Das Vaterunser, 1946 (1962^{5});
- Das Evangelium des Matthäus. Nachgelassene Ausarbeitungen und Entwürfe (hrsg. v. Werner Schmauch), KEK I,1, 1956 (1958^{2});
- Urchristl. Mystik. Neutestamentl. Studien, 1955;
- »Mir ist gegeben alle Gewalt!«. Eine Exegese von Mt. 28,16-20, in: In memoriam E. L. (hrsg. v. Werner Schmauch), 1951, 22–49.
