= Epistle to the Philippians =

Book of the New Testament

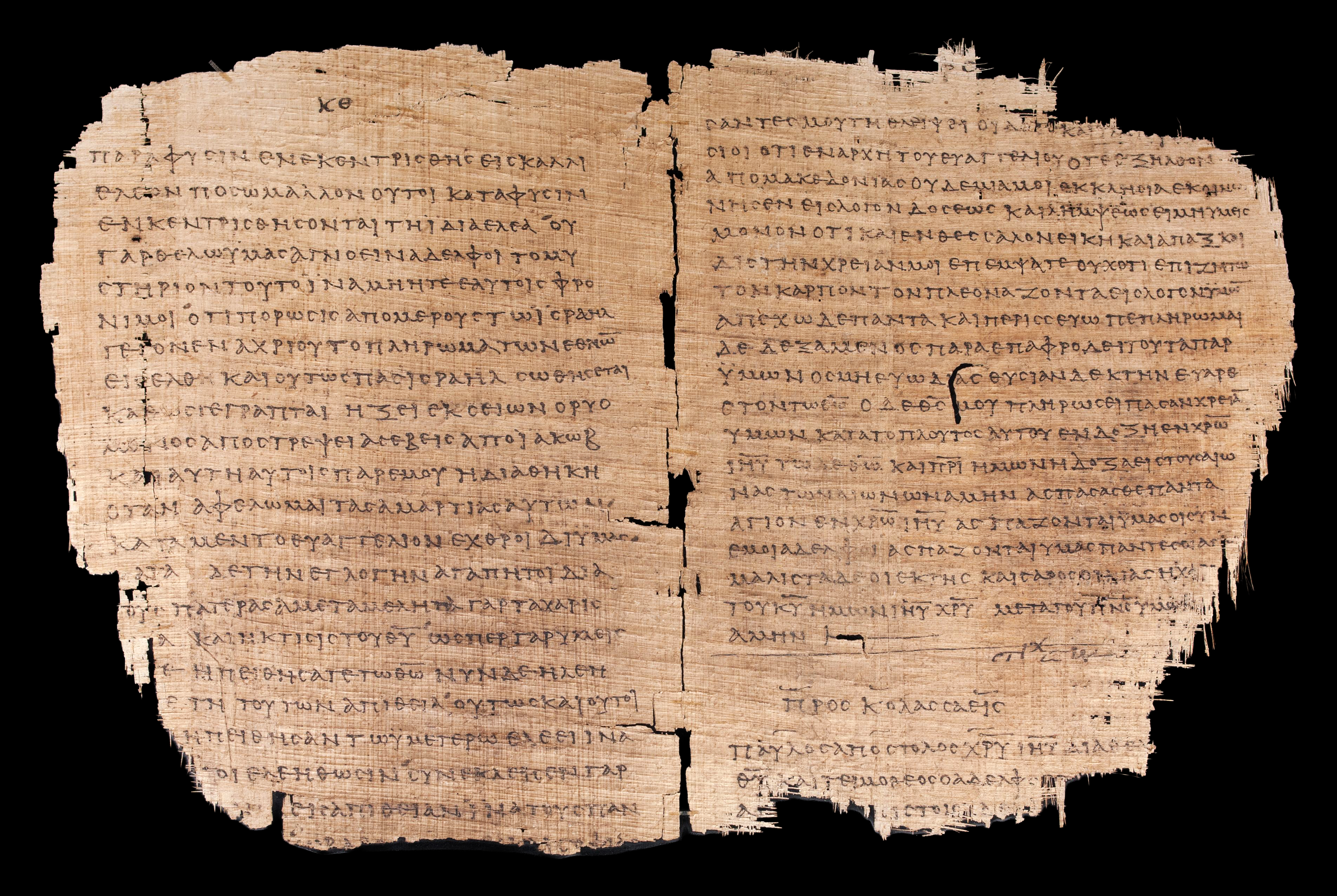
Text from Romans, along with Philippians 4:14–23 and the beginning of Colossians on Papyrus 46 (c. AD 200)

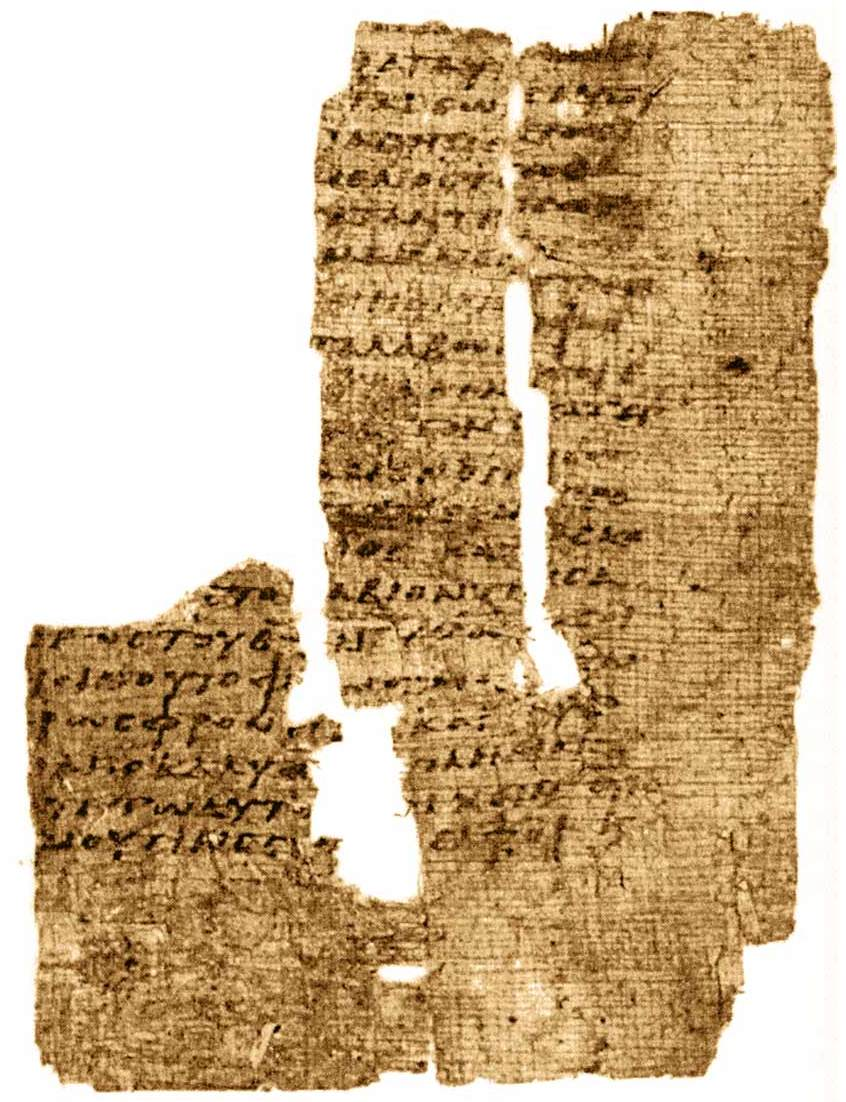
Philippians 3:10–17 on Papyrus 16 (c. AD 300)

The Epistle to the Philippians (Note: The book is sometimes called the Letter of Paul to the Philippians, or simply Philippians. It is most commonly abbreviated as "Phil.") is a Pauline epistle of the New Testament of the Christian Bible. The epistle is attributed to Paul the Apostle and Timothy is named with him as co-author or co-sender. The letter is addressed to the Christian church in Philippi. Paul, Timothy, Silas (and perhaps Luke) first visited Philippi in Greece (Macedonia) during Paul's second missionary journey from Antioch, which occurred between approximately 50 and 52 AD. In the account of his visit in the Acts of the Apostles, Paul and Silas are accused of "disturbing the city".

There is a general consensus that Philippians consists of authentically Pauline material, and that the epistle is a composite of multiple letter fragments from Paul to the church in Philippi. These letters could have been written from Ephesus in 52–55 AD or Caesarea Maritima in 57–59, but the most likely city of provenance is Rome, around 62 AD, or about 10 years after Paul's first visit to Philippi.

== Composition ==
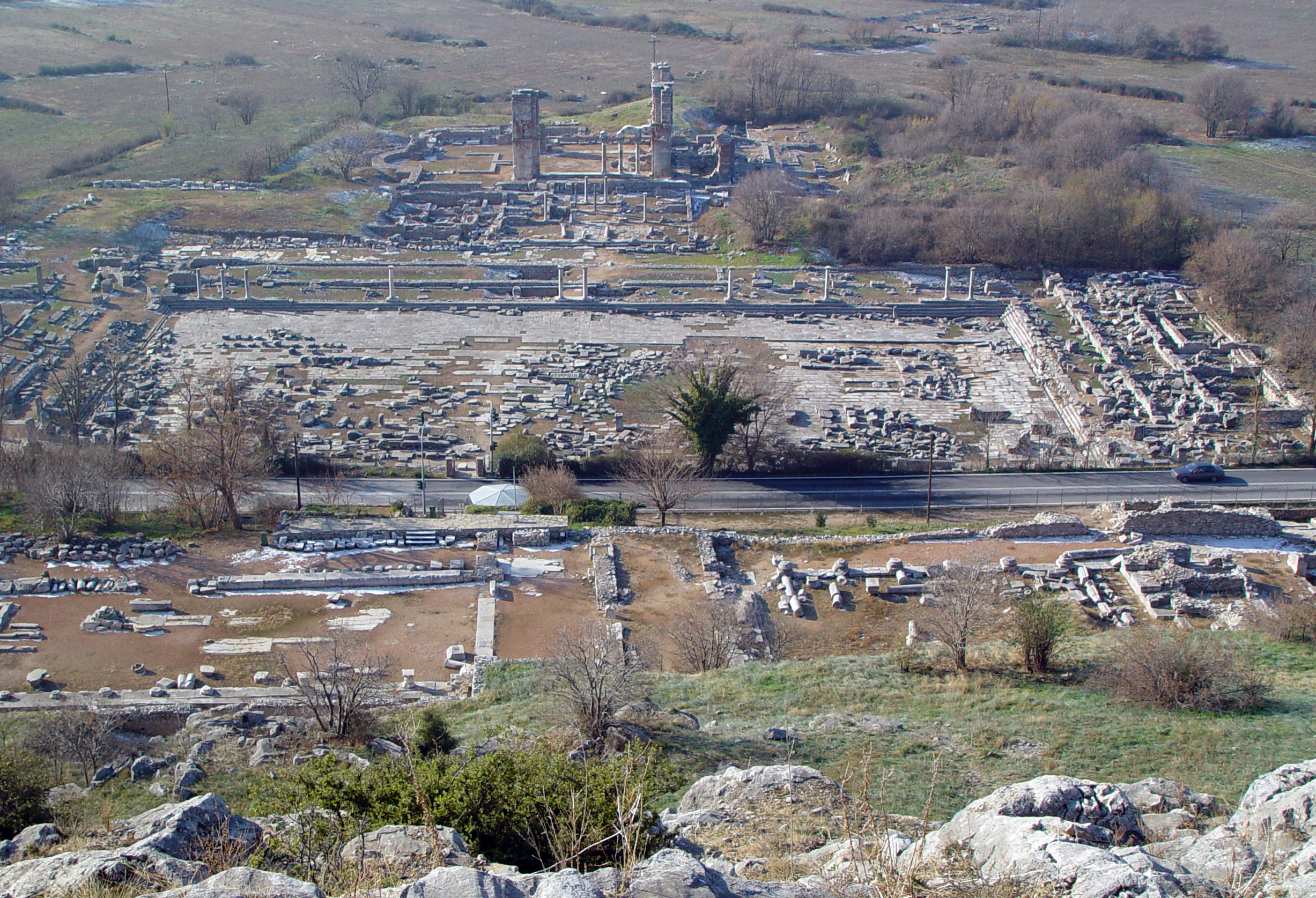
Ruins of Philippi, a city in Thrace (northeast Greece)

Starting in the 1960s, a consensus emerged among biblical scholars that Philippians was not written as one unified letter, but rather as a compilation of fragments from three separate letters from Paul to the church in Philippi. According to Philip Sellew, Philippians contains the following letter fragments:

- Letter A consists of Philippians 4:10–20. It is a short thank-you note from Paul to the Philippian church, regarding gifts they had sent him.
- Letter B consists of Philippians 1:1–3:1, and may also include 4:4–9 and 4:21–23.
- Letter C consists of Philippians 3:2–4:1, and may also include 4:2–3. It is a testament to Paul's rejection of all worldly things for the sake of the gospel of Jesus.

In support of the idea that Philippians is a composite work, Sellew pointed to the abrupt shifts in tone and topic within the text. There also seem to be chronological inconsistencies from one chapter to the next concerning Paul's associate Epaphroditus:

Another argument against unity has been found in the swiftly changing fortunes of Epaphroditus: this associate of Paul is at the point of death in chapter two (Phil 2:25–30), where seemingly he has long been bereft of the company of the Philippian Christians; Paul says that he intended to send him back to Philippi after this apparently lengthy, or at least near-fatal separation. Two chapters later, however, at the end of the canonical letter, Paul notes that Epaphroditus had only now just arrived at Paul's side, carrying a gift from Philippi, a reference found toward the close of the "thank-you note" as a formulaic acknowledgement of receipt at Phil 4:18.

— Philip Sellew

These letter fragments likely would have been edited into a single document by the first collector of the Pauline corpus, although there is no clear consensus among scholars regarding who this initial collector may have been, or when the first collection of Pauline epistles may have been published.

Today, a number of scholars believe that Philippians is a composite of multiple letter fragments. According to the theologian G. Walter Hansen, "The traditional view that Philippians was composed as one letter in the form presented in the NT [New Testament] can no longer claim widespread support."

Regardless of the literary unity of the letter, scholars agree that the material that was compiled into the Epistle to the Philippians was originally composed in Koine Greek, sometime during the 50s or early 60s AD.

=== Place of writing ===
Rome, Philippi, and Ephesus in the Mediterranean

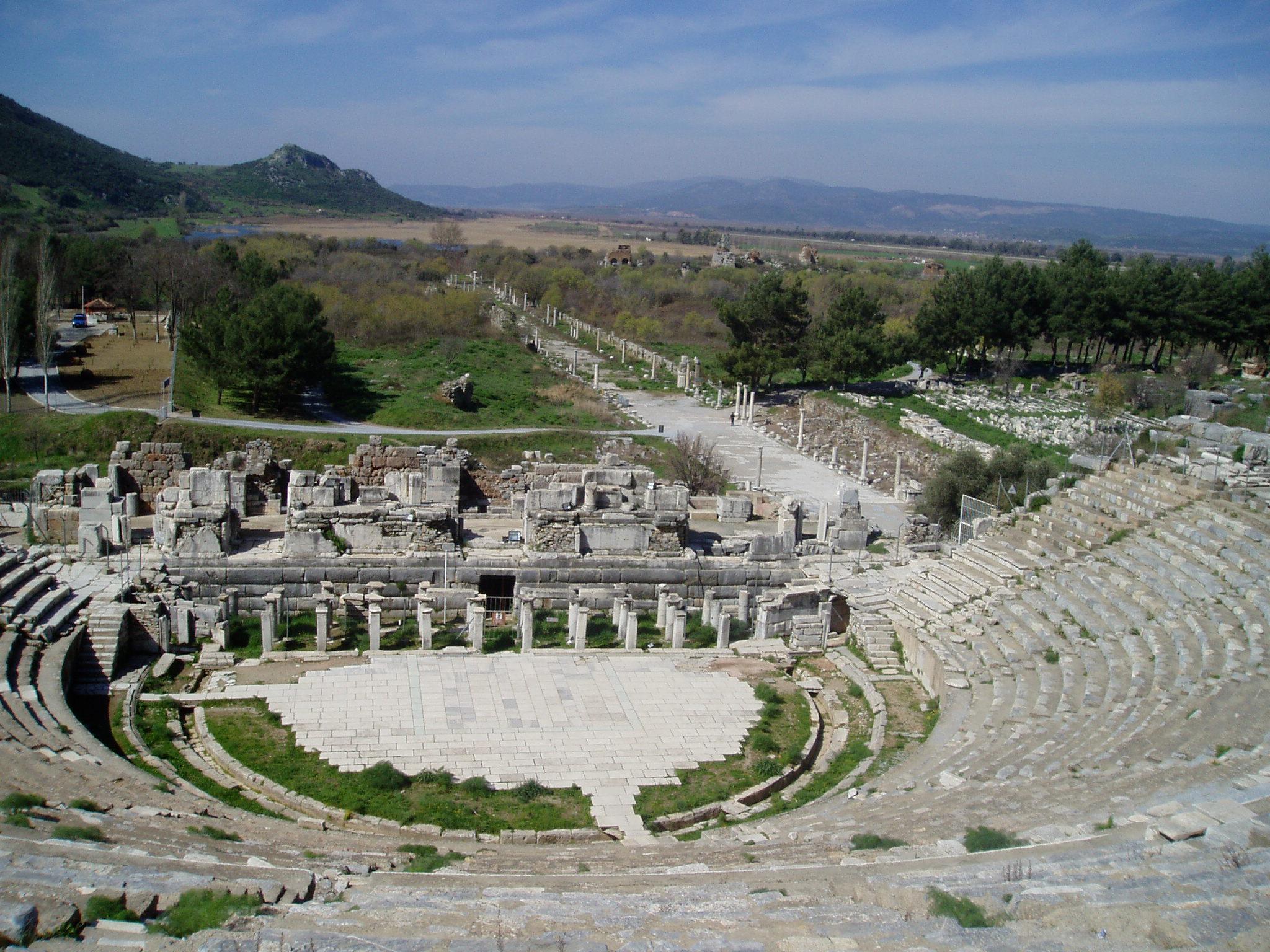
Ruins of Ephesus amphitheater with the harbor street leading to the coastline (2004)

It is uncertain where Paul was when he wrote the letter(s) that make up Philippians. Internal evidence in the letter itself points clearly to it being composed while Paul was in custody, but it is unclear which period of imprisonment the letter refers to. If the sequence of events given in the Acts of the Apostles is to be trusted, candidates would include the Roman imprisonment at the end of Acts, and the earlier Caesarean imprisonment. Any identification of the place of writing of Philippians is complicated by the fact that some scholars view Acts as being an unreliable source of information about the early Church.

Jim Reiher has suggested that the letters could have stemmed from the second period of Roman imprisonment attested by early church fathers. The main reasons suggested for a later date include:

1. The letter's highly developed Ecclesiology
2. An impending sense of death permeating the letter
3. The absence of any mention of Luke in a letter to Luke's home church (when the narrative in Acts clearly suggests that Luke was with Paul in his first Roman imprisonment)
4. A harsher imprisonment than the open house arrest of his first Roman imprisonment
5. A similar unique expression that is shared only with 2 Timothy
6. A similar disappointment with co-workers shared only with 2 Timothy

== Surviving early manuscripts ==
The original manuscript or manuscripts of the epistle are lost, and the text of surviving copies varies. The earliest surviving manuscripts were made centuries later, and include complete and partial copies:

- Papyrus 16 (3rd century)
- Codex Vaticanus (AD 325–350)
- Codex Sinaiticus (330–360)
- Codex Alexandrinus (400–440)
- Codex Ephraemi Rescriptus (c. 450)
- Codex Freerianus (c. 450)
- Codex Claromontanus (c. 550)

== Outline ==
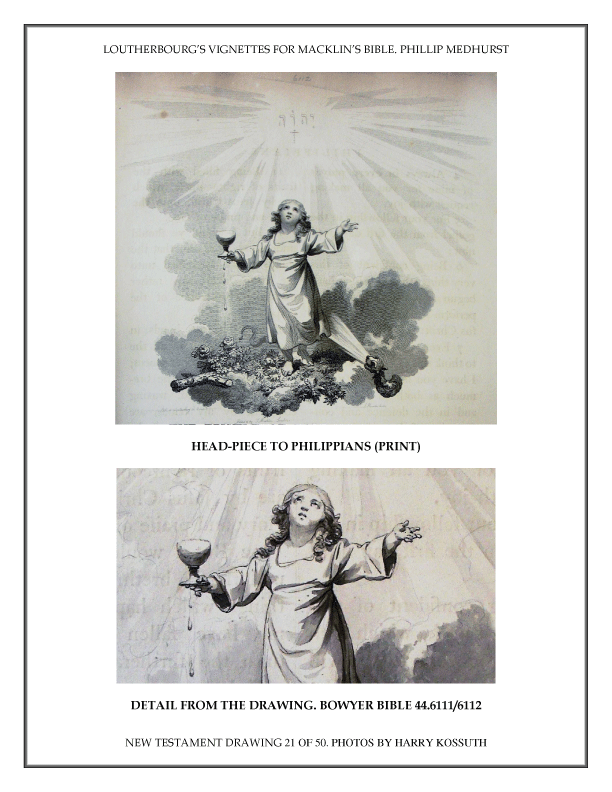
Head-piece to Philippians. Philippians 2:7-8. Print made by James Heath. 1800. Published by T. Macklin, London.

- I. Preface (1:1–11)
  - A. Salutation (1:1–2)
  - B. Thanksgiving for the Philippians' Participation in the Gospel (1:3–8)
  - C. Prayer for the Philippians' Discerning Love to Increase until the Day of Christ (1:9–11)
- II. Paul's Present Circumstances (1:12–26)
  - A. Paul's Imprisonment (1:12–13)
  - B. The Brothers' Response (1:14–17)
  - C. Paul's Attitude (1:18–26)
- III. Practical Instructions in Sanctification (1:27–2:30)
  - A. Living Boldly as Citizens of Heaven (1:27–1:30)
  - B. Living Humbly as Servants of Christ (2:1–11)
    - 1. The Motivation to Live Humbly (2:1–4)
    - 2. The Model of Living Humbly (2:5–11)
      - a. Christ's Emptying (2:5–8)
      - b. Christ's Exaltation (2:9–11)
  - C. Living Obediently as Children of God (2:12–18)
    - 1. The Energizing of God (2:12–13)
    - 2. The Effect on the Saints (2:14–18)
  - D. Examples of Humble Servants (2:19–30)
    - 1. The Example of Timothy (2:19–24)
    - 2. The Example of Epaphroditus (2:25–30)
- IV. Polemical Doctrinal Issues (3:1–4:1)
  - A. The Judaizers Basis: The Flesh (3:1–6)
  - B. Paul's Goal: The Resurrection (3:7–11)
  - C. Perfection and Humility (3:12–16)
  - D. Paul as an Example of Conduct and Watchfulness (3:17–4:1)
- V. Postlude (4:2–23)
  - A. Exhortations (4:2–9)
    - 1. Being United (4:2–3)
    - 2. Rejoicing without Anxiety (4:4–7)
    - 3. Thinking and Acting Purely (4:8–9)
  - B. A Note of Thanks (4:10–20)
    - 1. Paul's Contentment (4:10–13)
    - 2. The Philippians' Gift (4:14–18)
    - 3. God's Provision (4:19–20)
  - C. Final Greetings (4:21–23)

== Chapters 1 and 2 ==
In Chapters 1 and 2 of Philippians (Letter B), Paul sends word to the Philippians of his upcoming sentence in Rome and of his optimism in the face of death. This was part of his exhortations to imitate his capacity to rejoice in the Lord despite one's circumstances. Paul assures the Philippians that his imprisonment is actually helping to spread the Christian message, rather than hindering it. He also expresses gratitude for the devotion and heroism of Epaphroditus, whom the Philippian church had sent to visit Paul and bring him gifts. Some time during his visit with Paul, Epaphroditus apparently contracted some life-threatening debilitating illness. But he recovers before being sent back to the Philippians.

=== Greeting (1:1–2) ===
The epistle opens using a formula found in other Paul's epistles, here with the introduction of himself and Timothy as Christ's "slaves" ("bondservants") as in Romans 1:1.

Verse 1:1 is translated in the New King James Version as:

Paul and Timothy, bondservants of Jesus Christ,

To all the saints in Christ Jesus who are in Philippi, with the bishops and deacons:

"Bishops and deacons" could be translated as "overseers" and "helpers"; their functions in the church were not the same as they would later become.

Verse 1:2 is translated:

Grace to you and peace from God our Father and the Lord Jesus Christ.

The wording is identical to Ephesians 1:2.

=== Thanksgiving and prayer (1:3–11) ===
This is a common feature in Paul's epistles. Except in Galatians, Paul thanks or blesses God for the good things he has heard about a particular church in the beginning of his letters. In this epistle, Paul mixes it with his prayer for the church (1:3–4) and with joy (1:5), "a combination he will recommend in 4:6". Lutheran pietist Johann Albrecht Bengel says that the whole letter can thus be summarised: "The sum of the epistle is, I rejoice, rejoice ye". Similarly Paul writes to the Thessalonians: Rejoice always; pray without ceasing.

=== Paul's situation in chains (1:12–26) ===
This section deals with Paul's condition during the confinement in a Roman administrative center, where he could still preach the gospel. It consists of two subsections with distinctive keywords: the first subsection (verses 12–18) was marked off with two words, "progress" (prokope; verse 12) and "confidence" (verse 14), whereas the second subsection (verses 19–26) has the inclusio markers "joy", "progress" and "trusting".

Verse 1:21 is translated:

For to me, to live is Christ, and to die is gain.

"To die is gain": that is, when a believer dies one enters into the presence of God, where fullness of joy is, and immediately with Christ, which is far better than being alive here. This common interpretation is shown by the Syriac, Arabic, and Ethiopian versions, which read, "to die (or "if I die"), it is gain to me".

=== Unity of minds and hearts (2:1–4) ===
This section centers on Paul's appeal for unity of minds and hearts among the people, which can be expressed by four phrases: two using the keyword phronein ("of the same mind" or "of one mind"), then agape ("love") and sumpsuchoi ("united in soul" or "being in full accord"). Maintaining his reference to the joy which Paul already feels in respect to the Philippians (verses 1:4 and 1:25), he speaks of this joy being "made full, like a measure".

Verse 2:1 is translated in the King James Version:

If there be therefore any consolation in Christ, if any comfort of love, if any fellowship of the Spirit, if any bowels and mercies,

Meyer notes Paul's use of "four stimulative elements", which are assumed to apply and are not conditional. H. C. G. Moule notes that the word "bowels", as in the King James Version, was not used in any English version before 1582, and offers "tender mercies and compassions", as in the Revised Version (1881), as better wording: likewise the New International Version (1973 onwards) refers to "tenderness and compassion.

=== Christ poem (2:5–11) ===
Chapter 2 of the epistle contains a famous poem describing the nature of Christ and his act of redemption:

Let the same mind be in you that was in Christ Jesus.
Who, though he was in the form of God,
Did not regard being equal with God
Something to be grasped after.
But he emptied himself
Taking on the form of a slave,
And coming in the likeness of humans.
And being found in appearance as a human
He humbled himself
Becoming obedient unto death— even death on a cross.

Therefore God highly exalted him
And bestowed on him the name
That is above every name,
That at the name of Jesus
Every knee should bow
Of those in heaven, and on earth, and under the earth.
And every tongue should confess
That Jesus Christ is Lord
To the glory of God the Father.

— Philippians 2:5–11, translated by Bart D. Ehrman

Due to its unique poetic style, Bart D. Ehrman suggests that this passage constitutes an early Christian poem that was composed by someone else prior to Paul's writings, as early as the mid-late 30s AD and was later used by Paul in his epistle. According to Oxford scholar John Barton, "it may have been a poem, a hymn, or a creed, known already in the churches and quoted by Paul."

While the passage is often called a "hymn", some scholars believe this to be an inappropriate name since it does not have a rhythmic or metrical structure in the original Greek. This theory was first proposed by German Protestant theologian Ernst Lohmeyer in 1928, and this "has come to dominate both exegesis of Philippians and study of early Christology and credal formulas".

The Frankfurt silver inscription, the oldest known reliable evidence for Christianity north of the Alps (dating from between 230 and 270), quotes a Latin translation of Philippians 2:10–11.

==== Incarnation Christology ====
Some find the Christ poem significant because it strongly suggests that there were very early Christians who understood Jesus to be a pre-existent celestial being, who chose to take on human form, rather than a human who was later exalted to a divine status.

While the author of the poem apparently believed that Jesus existed in heaven before his physical incarnation, there is some debate about whether he was believed to be equal to God the Father prior to his death and resurrection. This largely depends on how the Greek words morphe (μορφή) and harpagmon (ἁρπαγμόν, accusative form of ἁρπαγμός) are understood.

Scholars such as English theologian J.B. Lightfoot have argued that morphe should be understood in the Aristotelian sense of "essential nature", but more recent scholarship by Robert B. Strimple and Paul D. Feinberg has questioned whether a first century Jewish author would have had Aristotelian philosophy in mind, preferring instead the plainer translation of the word morphe as simply "appearance". In this view, the text does not state that Jesus is God, but merely that he had the appearance of a god (v. 6) but was revealed to be a man (v. 8). Strimple writes, "For years I tried to maintain the view of Lightfoot that Paul here uses morphe with the sense it had acquired in Greek philosophy, particularly Aristotelian... But I have had to conclude that there is really very little evidence to support the conclusion that Paul uses morphe in such a philosophical sense here." Likewise, Feinberg cautions, "the attractiveness of the Greek philosophical interpretation of morphe is that it gives the theologian about as strong an affirmation of the deity of Christ as is possible... One must, however, be careful that he does not read his theological convictions into the text when they are not there."

The Greek word harpagmon translated in verse 6 ("Something to be grasped after / exploited") is also a subject of some debate. Some scholars, such as Bart D. Ehrman, following Samuel Vollenweider, have proposed that the word should be translated as "something to be grasped after", implying that the author of the hymn thought that Jesus was not equal to God before his resurrection. However, others scholars, such as R.W. Hoover, Gordon Fee, Michael J. Gorman, and N.T. Wright have supported the more standard notion that harpagmon represents an idiom meaning "taking advantage of" as more likely and more sensical within the hymn's theology.

Following this interpretation of harpagmon, scholars such as James D.G. Dunn and Oscar Cullmann suggest the author may be drawing a parallel between Adam and Jesus, who in other Pauline literature is called the Last Adam. The first Adam was made in the "image of God" (Genesis 1:26) but sinned by trying to grasp equality with God (Genesis 3:5). In contrast, Jesus, also made in the image of God (Phil. 2:5) did not try to grasp equality with God, but instead, humbled himself in obedience to God. Dunn sees the hymn as an archetypal parallel to Genesis: "The Philippians hymn is an attempt to read the life and work of Christ through the grid of Adam theology... the hymn is the epochal significance of the Christ-event, as determinative for humankind as the 'event' of Adam's creation and fall... Christ by his life, death, and resurrection has so completely reversed the catastrophe of Adam, has done so by the acceptance of death by choice rather than as punishment, as has thus completed the role of dominion over all things originally intended for Adam... It was Adam who was 'in the form of God'... the language was used... to bring out that Adamic character of Christ's life, death, and resurrection. So archetypal was Jesus' work in its effect that it can be described in language appropriate to archetypal man and as a reversal of the archetypal sin."

Similarly, Cullmann also notes the parallel between "form of God" in Phil. 2:5 and "image of God" in Genesis 1:26, "The expression morphe firmly establishes the connection between Jesus and the creation story of Adam... this Greek word corresponds to the Hebrew 'image' of Genesis 1:26... morphe in Phil. 2:6 is immediately related to the concept eikon (image) since the Semitic root word or its synonym can correspond to either of the two Greek words. This means that v. 6 does not refer to Jesus' divine 'nature' but rather to the image of God which he possessed from the beginning."

Although scholars remain divided on the question of the pre-existent Christ's equality with God, it is widely agreed by interpreters that the Christ poem depicts Jesus as equal to God after his resurrection. This is because the last two stanzas quote Isaiah 45:22–23: ("Every knee shall bow, every tongue confess"), which in the original context clearly refers to God the Father. Some scholars argue that Philippians 2:6–11 identifies Jesus with God from his pre-existence on the basis that allusions to Isaiah 45:22–23 are present all throughout the poem.

=== Timothy and Epaphroditus, Paul's go-betweens (2:19–30) ===
Two of Paul's helpers, Timothy and Epaphroditus, are introduced and the reasons for their journey are explained in this part, mainly to show Paul's affection for the people of Philippi.

== 3:1-4:1 ==
In Chapter 3 (Letter C), Paul warns the Philippians about those Christians who insist that circumcision is necessary for salvation. He testifies that while he once was a devout Pharisee and follower of the Jewish law, he now considers these things to be worthless and worldly compared to the gospel of Jesus.

=== Paul's re-evaluation of values through Christ (3:1–11) ===
Paul tells his own story and says how he "emptied himself" for Christ's sake and how his ultimate goal was now to follow the "upward call of God" (verse 14) to the end. Paul describes how his values had changed since becoming a follower of Christ. Jesuit theologian Robert Murray describes this process as a "transvaluation of values", using a phrase adopted from the philosophy of Friedrich Nietzsche.

Verse 3 is translated:

For we are the circumcision, who worship God in the Spirit, rejoice in Christ Jesus, and have no confidence in the flesh,

- "Worship": from Greek word λατρεία, latreia, which is 'used specially of the Jewish ceremonial service' (cf. Romans 9:4; Luke 2:37; Acts 26:7).

Verse 3:5 is translated:

circumcised the eighth day, of the stock of Israel, of the tribe of Benjamin, a Hebrew of the Hebrews; concerning the law, a Pharisee;

- "Circumcised the eight day": according to Genesis 17:12 (cf. Luke 2:21 of Jesus), so Paul became "a member of the covenant from infancy".
- "Tribe of Benjamin": Paul also stated his tribe in Romans 11:1.

Verse 3:8 is translated:

Yet indeed I also count all things loss for the excellence of the knowledge of Christ Jesus my Lord, for whom I have suffered the loss of all things, and count them as rubbish, that I may gain Christ

- "I count all things loss": in comparison to knowing Christ, anything else falls short.
- "The excellence of the knowledge of Christ Jesus": is not meant subjectively about the knowledge "in Christ" or "about Christ" (as God or as man), but objectively, knowing him in person, as God of all, mainly as "Savior and Redeemer", as Paul emphasizes using the words, "my Lord". The knowledge is attained, not by natural enlightenment, nor by reasoning, nor by the law of Moses, but by the Gospel of the grace of God. The efficient cause of this knowledge is God the Father, the Son, and the Spirit; the Father reveals Christ to his followers; the Son gives them an understanding to know him; and the Spirit gives wisdom and revelation in the knowledge of him. This spiritual knowledge of Christ is more excellent than a knowledge of Christ as human, as the knowledge of Christ from the Gospel is also more excellent than that of the legal dispensation, by promises, prophecies, and the ceremonial law.
- "For whom I have suffered the loss of all things": Paul dropped all confidence in his bodily privileges, civil, ceremonial, and moral righteousness, for Christ and his righteousness; losing his own good name and reputation among men, suffering many kinds of persecutions, losing the comforts of life, often in cold or nakedness, in hunger or thirst, even being ready to lose his own life for professing and preaching Christ.
- "Count them as rubbish" (KJV: "dung"): or "dog's meat" (Philippians 3:2), what is only fit for dogs; that is, Paul treats as "worthless" his pedigree, religion sect, and moral righteousness before and after conversion; and everything material that he owns, same as what the early church held, considering its own righteousness as "filthy rags".
- "That I may gain Christ": not just get "an interest in him", as this he knew he had already, and should never lose it, for it commenced from all eternity and cannot be obtained by good works, nor repentance, nor faith, but is freely given. Paul wishes that he might gain a larger knowledge of Christ, without care what pains he took, what expenses he was at, nor what loss he sustained or already suffered for what he regards precious, even willing to lose more, for more of this knowledge (cf. Philippians 3:10), because then he gains more with Christ as a "justifying righteousness": acceptance with God, pardon, life, peace, grace, and glory.

=== Citizens of earth and heaven (3:17–4:1) ===
Translator J. B. Phillips, commentator Robert Murray, the New Revised Standard Version and the Jerusalem Bible connect verse 1 with the final section of the previous chapter, as the conclusion of Paul's main exhortations in chapters 2 and 3. Commentator Joseph Benson says "certainly it should not have been separated" from chapter 3.

Paul argues that it is right to be good citizens, but "our citizenship (politeuma) is in heaven". The section calls on the Philippians to be co-imitators of himself (the Greek word συμμιμηταί, summimetai, translated as "co-imitators" or "imitators together", is not elsewhere preserved).

== 4:2-4:23 ==
In Chapter 4, Paul urges the Philippians to resolve conflicts within their fellowship. In the latter part of the chapter (Letter A), Paul expresses his gratitude for the gifts that the Philippians had sent him, and assures them that God will reward them for their generosity.

Throughout the epistle there is a sense of optimism. Paul is hopeful that he will be released, and on this basis he promises to send Timothy to the Philippians for ministry, and also expects to pay them a personal visit.

=== Last appeal for harmony (4:2–3) ===
Paul asks the two diakonoi, Euodia and Syntyche, female leaders of different house-groups in Philippi, "to be of the same mind" (to think, phronein, "the same"). Historian Paula Fredriksen has cited this as evidence that women participated in the Pauline mission.

Verse 4:3 is translated:

And I urge you also, true companion, help these women who laboured with me in the gospel, with Clement also, and the rest of my fellow workers, whose names are in the Book of Life.

Paul addresses one of the leaders responsible for the church. Benson suggests he is probably addressing Silas, "for Silas had been his yoke-fellow at the very place". For discussion about whether the Clement named here was the church leader who later became Pope Clement I, see Clement of Rome. Modern scholarship suggests that there is no connection between them.

=== Last call to joy, peace, and right thinking in Christ (4:4–9) ===
According to Paul, the cure of the troubles in the church is to recall "the charismatic joy of their first coming to faith", just as he told the Thessalonian church that "in spite of persecutions you received the word with joy inspired by the Holy Spirit" (1 Thessalonians 1:6).

=== Paul's attitude to gifts received and last greetings (4:10–23) ===
Paul acknowledges the support from the church in Philippi, describing it as "a sacrifice pleasing to God", and prays that God will take care of their needs, before closing the epistle with a mention of "Caesar's household" ("the emperor's household") in verse 22, probably as a hint (cf. Philippians 1:13) of the success Paul in obtaining Praetorian contacts.

Verse 4:13 is given in the New King James Version:

I can do all things through Christ who strengthens me.

The Greek word Χριστῷ (Christō, "Christ") is found in the majority of older manuscripts, but others lack explicit reference, so are rendered as "him".

== Uses ==
Portions of Philippians are used in various Christian lectionaries for regularly scheduled Bible readings. Philippians 2:5-11 is appointed as the Epistle lesson for Palm Sunday in the Roman Missal and the Book of Common Prayer (1662), as well as the ecumenical Revised Common Lectionary. Philippians 4:4-7 is appointed for the Third Sunday of Advent (traditionally known as Gaudete Sunday) in the Missale Romanum (Roman Missal) of 1570, and for the Fourth Sunday of Advent in the Book of Common Prayer (1662). In the Ordo Lectionum Missae of 1969, the American Book of Common Prayer (1979), and Revised Common Lectionary, this passage is appointed for the Third Sunday in Advent in Year C.

"Philippians 3:20-21" is a song title in the album "The Life of the World to Come" inspired by these verses that was released by the American band The Mountain Goats in 2009.

== See also ==
- Textual variants in the Epistle to the Philippians
- Cupio dissolvi

== Sources ==
- Coogan, Michael David (2007). Coogan, Michael David; Brettler, Marc Zvi; Newsom, Carol Ann; Perkins, Pheme (eds.). The New Oxford Annotated Bible with the Apocryphal/Deuterocanonical Books: New Revised Standard Version, Issue 48 (Augmented 3rd ed.). Oxford University Press. ISBN 9780195288810.

Epistle to the Philippians Pauline Epistle
Preceded by Ephesians	New Testament; Books of the Bible	Succeeded by Colossians
