= Terminal Earth =

Studio album by Scanner
- Released: 1989
- Genre: Speed metal, power metal
- Length: 47:19
- Label: Noise Records

Scanner chronology
Hypertrace (1988)	Terminal Earth (1989)	Mental Reservation (1995)

Terminal Earth is the second full-length album by the German speed metal band Scanner. It was released in 1989 by Noise Records.

== Track listing ==
No.	Title	Length
1.	"The Law"	4:17
2.	"Not Alone"	3:52
3.	"Wonder"	4:07
4.	"Buy or Die"	4:59
5.	"Telemania"	4:36
6.	"Touch the Light"	5:02
7.	"Terminal Earth"	3:51
8.	"From the Dust of Ages"	9:25
9.	"The Challenge"	4:35
10.	"L.A.D.Y."	4:35

== Credits ==
- S.L. Coe – vocals
- Axel Julius – guitars
- Tom Sopha – guitars
- Martin Bork – bass
- Wolfgang Kolorz – drums

== Charts ==
=== Weekly charts ===
Chart (2024)	Peak position
Greek Albums (IFPI)	75
