= Ball of the Damned =

Studio album by Scanner
- Released: 1996
- Genre: Speed metal, power metal
- Length: 44:04
- Label: Massacre Records

Scanner chronology
Mental Reservation (1995)	Ball of the Damned (1996)	Scantropolis (2002)

Ball of the Damned is the fourth full-length album by the German speed metal band Scanner. It was released in 1996 by Massacre Records.

== Track listing ==
1. "Puppet on a String" – 6:52
2. "Frozen Under the Sun" – 5:55
3. "We Start It Tomorrow" – 4:59
4. "The True-Stories-Teller" – 4:05
5. "Tollshocked" – 4:05
6. "Lord Barker's Theme" – 1:15
7. "Ball of the Damned" – 6:16
8. "Judge on the Run" – 4:15
9. "Intermezzo" – 1:19
10. "Innuendo" (Queen cover) – 5:01

All lyrics by A.Julius; all musics by Julius, except 1 by Julius & Smith.

== Credits ==
- Leszek Szpigiel – vocals, narration
- Axel Julius – guitar, guitar synthesiser, music
- Stefan Nicolai – guitars
- Stephan Braun – keyboards, samples
- Marc Simon – bass
- D. D. Bucco – drums, percussion
- Gerald Salomon – organ
- Ralf Scheepers – guest vocals on "Puppet on a String"
