= Scantropolis =

Studio album by Scanner
- Released: 2002
- Genre: Speed metal, power metal
- Length: 48:39
- Label: Massacre Records

Scanner chronology
Ball of the Damned (1997)	Scantropolis (2002)	The Judgement (2015)

Scantropolis
Review scores
Source	Rating
Disagreement.net	9/10 stars
MetalReviews.com	78/100

Scantropolis is the fifth full-length album by the German speed metal band Scanner. It was released in 2002 by Massacre Records.

== Track listing ==
1. "Till the Ferryman Dies" – 5:11
2. "Hallowed Be My Name" – 5:20
3. "Flight of the Eagle" – 4:07
4. "Turn of the Tide" – 6:07
5. "Always Alien" – 4:45
6. "Engel Brechts" – 3:43
7. "Sister Mary" – 5:49
8. "The Gambler" – 4:30
9. "R.I.P. (Rest in Pain)" – 3:16
10. "Till the Ferryman Dies" (live in Stockholm) – 5:51

== Credits ==
- Lisa Croft – vocals
- Axel Julius – guitars, keyboards, back vocals
- Thilo Zaun – guitars
- Johannes Brunn – keyboards
- Marc Simon – bass, keyboards, sound
- Jan Zimmer – drums
