= Papyrus 16 =

Papyrus 𝔓^{16}
- New Testament manuscript
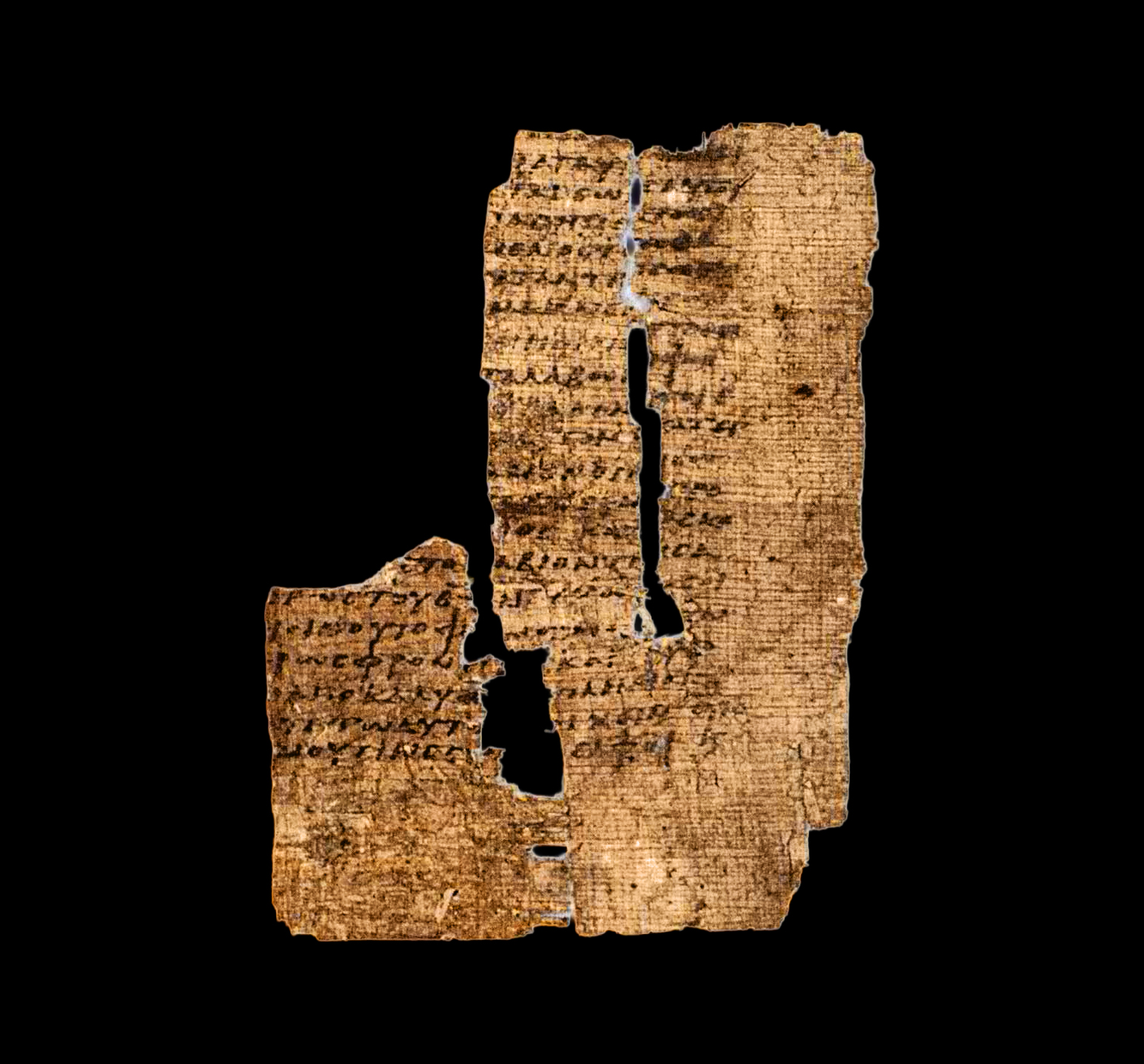
- Recto Philippians 3, 10–17
- Name: P. Oxy. 1009
- Text: Philippians 3-4 †
- Date: 3rd/4th century
- Script: Greek
- Found: Egypt
- Now at: Egyptian Museum
- Cite: B. P. Grenfell & A. S. Hunt, Oxyrhynchus Papyri VII, (London 1910), pp. 8-11
- Type: Alexandrian text-type
- Category: I

Papyrus 16 (in the Gregory-Aland numbering), designated by 𝔓^{16}, is an early copy of the New Testament in Greek. It was part of a papyrus manuscript containing the Pauline letters. It contains Philippians 3:10–17; 4:2–8. The manuscript has been palaeographically assigned either to the 3rd century or the fourth century.

== Description ==
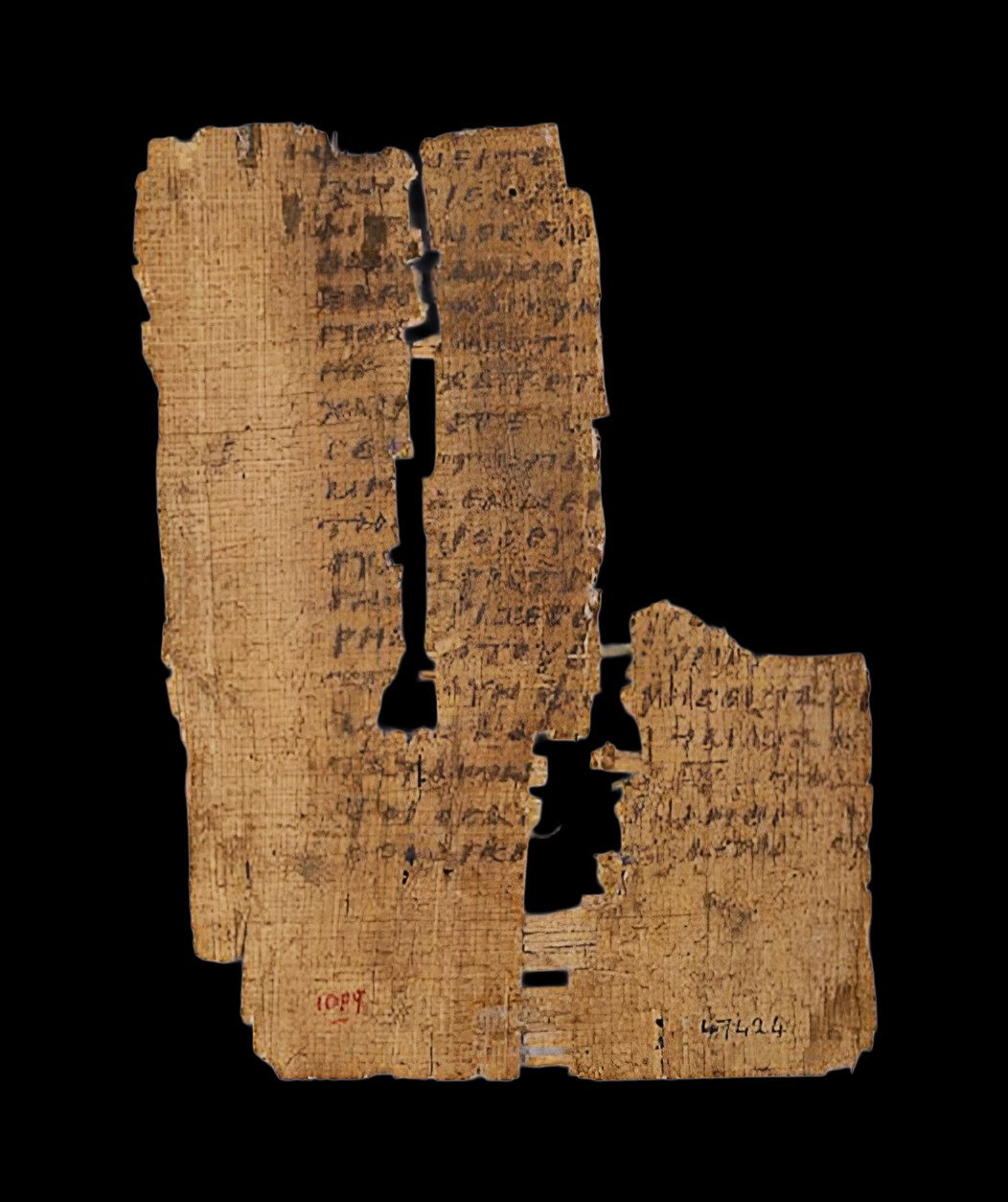
Verso Philippians 4, 2-8

The manuscript is written in a competent literary hand that is sometimes described as belonging to the "severe style." There are about 37-38 lines per page. 𝔓^{15} and 𝔓^{16} were almost certainly part of the same manuscript.

The nomina sacra are written in an abbreviated way. The text was not corrected.

The Greek text of this codex is a representative of the Alexandrian text-type (rather proto-Alexandrian). Aland placed it in Category I. This manuscript diverges from the text of UBS4 8 times, from Codex Vaticanus 9 times, and from Codex Sinaiticus 10 times. 𝔓^{16} diverges from readings of the majority of all New Testament manuscripts 11 times.

It is currently housed at the Bibliotheca Alexandrina (BAAM 0544) in Alexandria.

== See also ==
- List of New Testament papyri
- Philippians 3; 4
