= Scanner (band) =

German power metal band

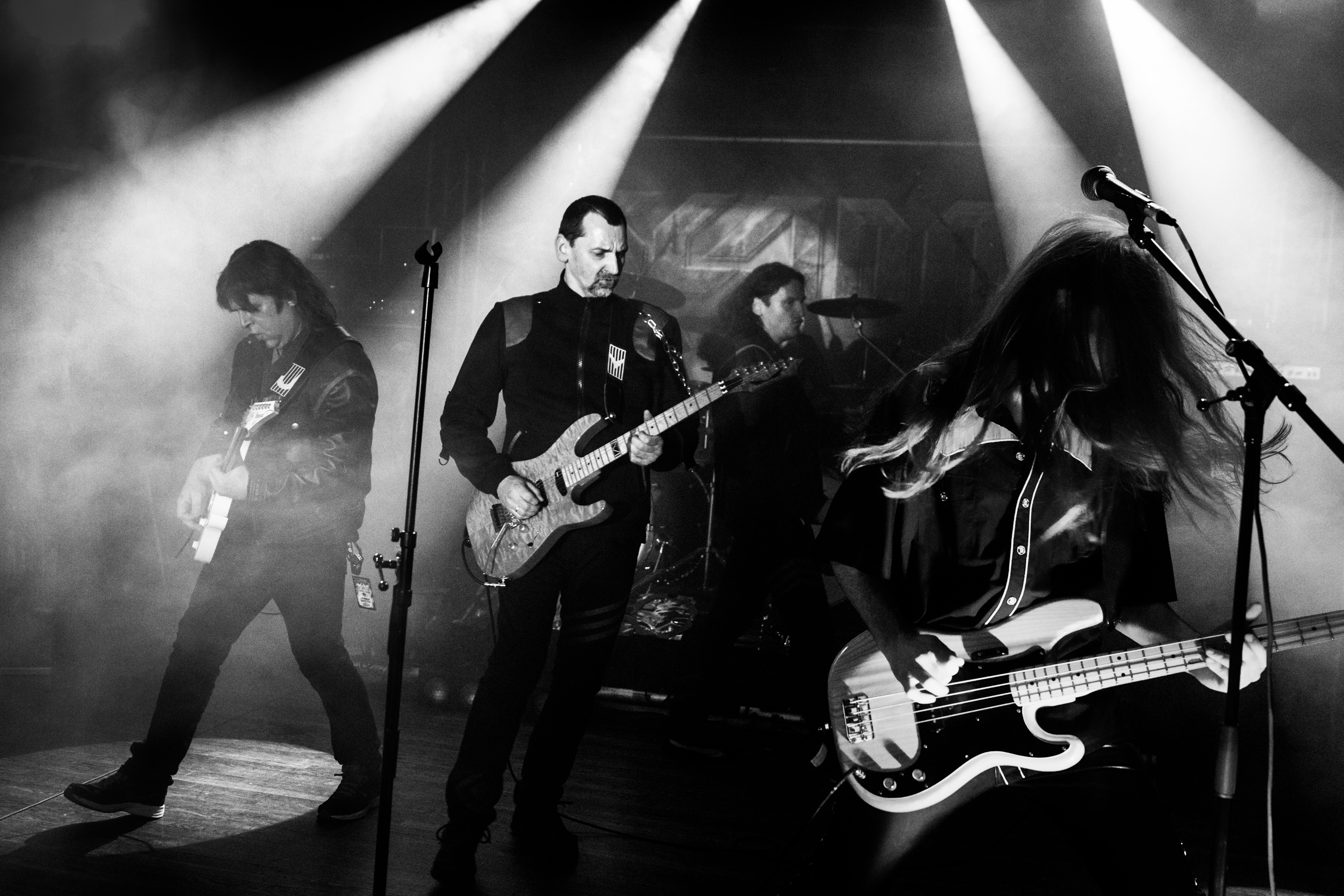
- Scanner – Börsencrash Festival 2015

Background information
- Origin: Gelsenkirchen, Germany
- Genres: Power metal, speed metal
- Years active: 1986–present
- Labels: Noise, Massacre, Rock of Angels
- Members: Efthimios Ioannidis; Axel A.J. Julius; Dominik Rothe; Jörn Bettentrup; Sascha Kurpanek
- Past members: See below
- Website: scanner4u.de

Scanner is a German power metal band that was formed in 1986. Three of the band members had previously taken part in an album release by the band Lions Breed, Damn the Night (Earthshaker 1985). The band changed its name to Scanner, adopting a science fiction image for their lyrics, album covers and live performances. They released their first album, Hypertrace, in 1988 through Noise Records. They have reformed twice, releasing their latest album on 12 January 2024, The Cosmic Race, via Rock of Angels Records.

== Members ==
=== Current line-up ===
- Axel A.J. Julius – guitars (1986–1990, 1995–present)
- Efthimios Ioannidis – vocals (2003–present)
- Jörn Bettentrup – bass (2017–present)
- Dominik Rothe – guitars (2023–present)
- Sascha Kurpanek – drums (2023–present)

=== Past members ===
- Thilo Zaun – guitars (1997–2006)
- Martin Bork – bass (1986–1990)
- Wolfgang Kolorz – drums (1986–1990)
- Thomas Sopha – guitars (1986–1990)
- Michael "M.A.J.O.R." Knoblich – vocals (1986–1989)
- S.L. Coe – vocals (1989–1990)
- Haridon Lee – vocals (1995–1997)
- John A.B.C. Smith – bass (1995–1997)
- D.D. Bucco – drums (1995–1997)
- Stefan Nicolai – guitars (1995–1997)
- Stephan Braun – keyboards (1996–1997)
- Marc Simon – bass (1997–2003)
- Johannes Brunn – keyboards (2000–2005)
- Jan Zimmer – drums (2002–2003)
- Lisa Croft – vocals (2002–2003)
- Stephan Jacobs – bass (2003–2004)
- Franz Eichberger – drums (2003–2005, 2011–2013)
- Kayuri Niwa – bass (2004–2006)
- Florian Haack – guitars (2006–2007)
- Torben Böhm – bass (2007–2008)
- Oliver Emanowski – bass (2009–2012)
- Matt Bauer – drums (2009–2010)
- Patrick Klose – drums (2010–2011, 2013–2015)
- Andreas Zeidler – guitars (2007–2019)
- Hanno Kirstan – drums (2015–2018)
- Jonathan Sell – bass (2012–2016)
- William Chapman – bass (2016–2017)
- Stefan Weber – guitars (2019–2023)
- Boris Frenkel – drums (2018–2023)
- Patrick Donath – guitars (2019)

== Discography ==
=== Albums ===
- Hypertrace (1988)
- Terminal Earth (1989)
- Mental Reservation (1995)
- Ball of the Damned (1996)
- Scantropolis (2002)
- The Judgement (2015)
- The Galactos Tapes – Best Of (2017)
- The Cosmic Race (2024)

=== Demos ===
- Conception of a Cure (1994)
