= Cool from the Wire =

Studio album by Dirty Looks
- Released: 1988
- Genre: Hard rock
- Length: 41:21
- Label: Atlantic
- Producer: Max Norman

Dirty Looks chronology
I Want More (1987)	Cool from the Wire (1988)	Turn of the Screw (1989)

Singles from Cool from the Wire
- 1. "Can't Take My Eyes off of You" Released: 1988; 2. "Oh Ruby" Released: 1988; 3. "Wastin' My Time" Released: 1988

Professional ratings
Review scores
Source	Rating
Allmusic	4.5/5 stars

Cool from the Wire is the major-label debut album from American hard rock band Dirty Looks. It was released in 1988 on Atlantic Records. It includes the song "Oh Ruby", that received airplay on rock stations. "It’s Not the Way You Rock" was used in the film Johnny Be Good, and appeared on its soundtrack. The album peaked #134 in Billboard 200.

== Track listing ==
All tracks are written by Dirty Looks.

Side A
No.	Title	Length
1.	"Cool from the Wire"	3:34
2.	"It's Not the Way You Rock"	3:49
3.	"Can't Take My Eyes Off of You"	3:22
4.	"Oh Ruby"	4:07
5.	"Tokyo"	3:06
6.	"Wastin' My Time"	3:32
Total length:		21:30

Side B
No.	Title	Length
7.	"Put a Spell on You"	3:49
8.	"No Brains Child"	3:53
9.	"Get It Right"	4:17
10.	"It's a Bitch"	4:26
11.	"Get Off"	3:26
Total length:		19:51

== Personnel ==
- Gene Barnett – drums
- Matt Lane – assistant engineer
- Paul Lidel – guitar, background vocals
- Bob Ludwig – mastering
- Phil Magnotti – assistant engineer
- Max Norman – producer
- Henrik Ostergaard – guitar, lead vocals
- Jack Pyers – bass
