= Dirty Looks (Pennsylvania band) =

American rock band

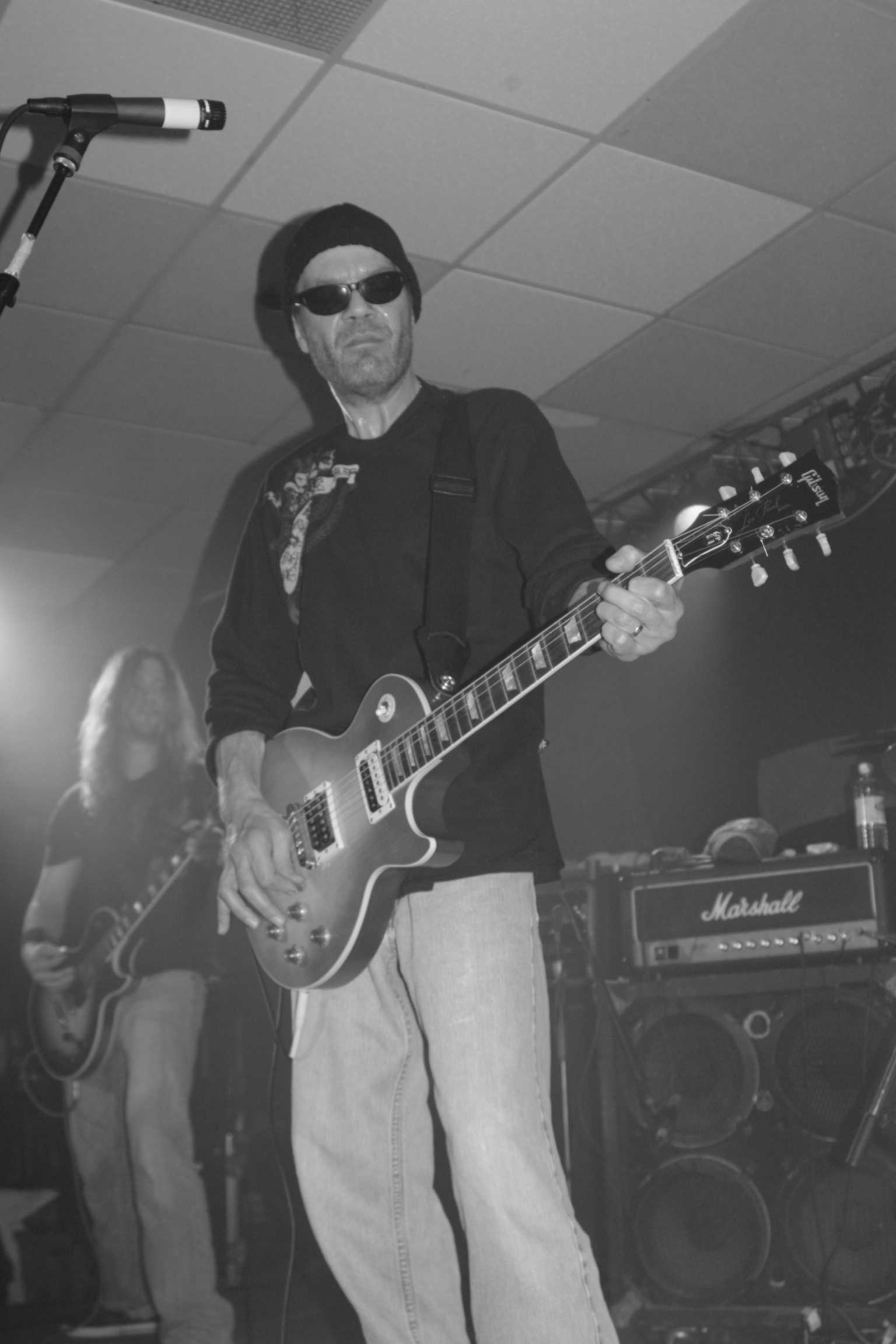
- Henrik Ostergaard performing in 2009

Background information
- Origin: Erie, Pennsylvania, U.S.
- Genres: Hard rock; glam metal
- Years active: 1984–1993; 1994–1996; 2007–2011
- Labels: Atlantic; FNA; Sony/Rockworld; Mirror; BH; Shrapnel; Sticky; Perris
- Website: dirtylooksmusic.com

Dirty Looks was an American hard rock band of members primarily from Erie, Pennsylvania. Although the principal members had been in an earlier band together in Pennsylvania, they met up to form Dirty Looks in San Francisco, California, in 1984.

== History ==
Originally from the Erie, Pennsylvania cover band Crossfire, Danish-born vocalist/guitarist Henrik Ostergaard and fellow Crossfire bandmate and bassist Jimmy Chartley traveled to San Francisco to form Dirty Looks in 1984. Fellow Crossfire bandmate Boyd Baker joined them a year later.

While in California and upon their return home to Philadelphia, the group had a revolving door membership, yet released an EP and three independent albums before Atlantic Records offered them a recording contract. For their major label debut, Dirty Looks consisted of Paul Lidel (guitar), Jack Pyers (bass) and Gene Barnett (drums). The resulting album, Cool From The Wire in 1988, entered the Billboard chart, while getting substantial airplay on MTV for their video for the song "Oh Ruby". Produced by Max Norman (Ozzy Osbourne, Megadeth, Lynch Mob), it is still regarded by many as one of the best hard rock albums of all time. Twenty five years later, Cool From The Wire continues to sell online and in record stores all across the globe.

For the follow-up album in 1989, there were conflicts with their original producer Beau Hill, and the original recordings for Turn Of The Screw were scrapped, but the reworked album would be the group's most successful release reaching higher on the Billboard chart. The President of Atlantic Records and the higher-ups of their new management team thought that it would benefit the band if they hired a producer who had current albums on the Billboard charts. The Hill sessions were scrapped and John Jansen was brought in to produce Turn Of The Screw, which was released in 1989. After the album was released, the band toured in promotion.

Their album of outtakes, Bootlegs was released in 1991, then the group broke up in 1993 following the release of Five Easy Pieces with Ostergaard forming Rumbledog with Brian Perry of Dirty Looks, Robbin Crosby of Ratt and Paul Monroe of XYZ, Lidel hooking up with Dangerous Toys (and later Broken Teeth and Adrenaline Factor) and bassist Brian Perry resurfacing in Flood, Jake E. Lee's "Wicked Alliance" Prong, and Rhino Bucket.

Ostergaard began recording under the Dirty Looks moniker again in 1994, to record the Chewing on the Bit album. Then he worked with Rumbledog again, releasing an album in 1995. Original drummer, Todd Yetter (of American Sugar Bitch) was replaced and not credited. The lineup continued with bassist Jassen Wilber, drummer Ron Sutton, guitarist Mike Ondrusek and guitarist Mike Smith. Ostergaard put out two releases as Dirty Looks in 1996.

With the personnel above, minus Ondrusek and adding singer Gabriel Scott Robison, Ostergaard took a back seat in the vocal department and formed the Burning Orange project who released an album splitting up in 1996. After that, Ostergaard retired from the music industry to focus on family life. In early 2007, Ostergaard nearly died from alcohol poisoning. With the changing climate of the music scene, the release sold moderately, prompting the current band members to branch off into different directions and pursue other projects.

According to their Myspace page, Dirty Looks reformed in 2007, and released a new album, Gasoline. Two more studio albums were released in 2008; Superdeluxe and California Free Ride.

At the end of 2009, Dirty Looks signed with the Nashville, Tennessee based label FNA Records. In 2010, they rereleased three albums.

On February 5, 2010, bassist Greg Pianka was stabbed to death in a bar brawl at Hi & Dri Pub along West Lake Road in Erie.

Henrik Ostergaard died at the age of 47, on January 27, 2011. The Erie County, Pennsylvania coroner stated that he had died of liver failure while under hospice care.

In December 2019, it was announced that members from the band's Cool from the Wire album, Paul Lidel, Jack Pyers, and Gene Barnett, along with former Broken Teeth vocalist, Jason McMaster, whom Lidel plays with in Dangerous Toys, and Broken Teeth guitarist, David Beeson, would be performing two shows in 2020 with the tagline Dirty Looks - As Close As It Gets. The group was scheduled to perform Cool From The Wire in its entirety at Ballroom Blitz Music Festival in Glen Burnie, Maryland and at a fundraiser held in the DH&L Fire Station in Selinsgrove, Pennsylvania. These shows were canceled due to the COVID-19 pandemic, with the Pennsylvania show later rescheduled to Saturday, September 18, 2021 at the Selinsgrove Racetrack. More than 1,000 fans attended the live celebration, and a 17 song CD/DVD of the live event titled "Cool From The Speedway" was released in 2022.

Fronted by Jason McMaster, Dirty Looks joined the roster of bands on the 2023 Monster of Rock Cruise (MORC) and performed on Tuesday May 2, 2023, and again on Wednesday May 3, 2023.

== Members ==
- Includes members of Rumbledog, Burning Orange, and other side projects

Group members 1984–2011
| First name | Last name | Instrument | Start year | End year |
|---|---|---|---|---|
| Paul Anthony | Stage | bass | 1984 | 1984 |
| Scot T. | Garcia | guitar | 1984 | 1984 |
| Jimmy | Chartley | bass | 1984 | 1985 |
| Paul Anthony "Buck" | Dulle | drums | 1984 | 1985 |
| Henrik | Ostergaard | guitar | 1984 | 1996 |
| Henrik | Ostergaard | vocals | 1984 | 1996 |
| John | Pelinski | bass | 1985 | 1986 |
| Steve | McConnell | drums | 1985 | 1986 |
| Boyd | Baker | guitar | 1985 | 1986 |
| A.D. | Adams | drums | 1986 | 1987 |
| Jack | Pyers | bass | 1986 | 1990 |
| Chris | Bensch | guitar | 1987 | 1987 |
| Gene | Barnett | drums | 1987 | 1990 |
| Paul | Lidel | guitar | 1987 | 1994 |
| Chris | Caffery | guitar | 1988 | 1989 |
| Dave | Naro | bass | 1990 | 1991 |
| Cary | Devore | drums | 1990 | 1991 |
| Jack | Pyers | bass | 1991 | 1991 |
| Ed | Collins | drums | 1991 | 1991 |
| J.Michael | Davis | drums | 1991 | 1991 |
| Brian | Perry | bass | 1991 | 1993 |
| James | Harris | drums | 1991 | 1993 |
| Gene | Barnett | drums | 1993 | 1993 |
| Paul | Monroe | drums | 1993 | 1993 |
| Robbin | Crosby | guitar | 1993 | 1993 |
| Steve | McConnell | drums | 1993 | 1996 |
| Idzi | | bass | 1994 | 1994 |
| John | Allen | drums | 1994 | 1994 |
| Ron | Sutton | drums | 1994 | 1994 |
| Todd | Yetter | drums | 1994 | 1994 |
| Alex | Kane | guitar | 1994 | 1994 |
| Nicky | Kay | guitar | 1994 | 1994 |
| Keith | Barrows | bass | 1994 | 1995 |
| Charlie | George | drums | 1994 | 1995 |
| Mike | Ondrusek | guitar | 1994 | 1995 |
| Jassen | Wilber | bass | 1994 | 1996 |
| Mike | Smith | guitar | 1994 | 1996 |
| Gabriel | Scott (Robinson) | vocals | 1996 | 1996 |
| Henrik | Ostergaard | guitar | 2006 | 2011 |
| Henrik | Ostergaard | vocals | 2006 | 2011 |
| Trevor | Huster | bass | 2007 | 2007 |
| Jason | McMaster | bass | 2007 | 2007 |
| Jeremy | Hummel | drums | 2007 | 2007 |
| Steve | McConnell | drums | 2007 | 2007 |
| Bruce | Rivers | drums | 2007 | 2007 |
| Ron | Sutton | drums | 2007 | 2007 |
| Doug | Welser | drums | 2007 | 2007 |
| Trevor | Huster | guitar | 2007 | 2007 |
| Mike | Ohm | guitar | 2007 | 2007 |
| Paul | Lidel | guitar | 2007 | 2007 |
| Jack | Pyers | bass | 2007 | 2011 |
| Doug | Phillips | bass | 2008 | 2008 |
| Ed | Collins | drums | 2008 | 2008 |
| Ron | Sutton | drums | 2008 | 2008 |
| Eric | Brewer | guitar | 2008 | 2008 |
| Christopher | Shaner | guitar | 2008 | 2009 |
| Jeff | Smith | drums | 2009 | 2009 |
| Greg | Pianka | bass | 2009 | 2010 |
| Bill | Dailey | drums | 2009 | 2011 |
| Scott | Parmenter | guitar | 2009 | 2011 |

== Discography ==
=== Studio albums ===
- (1985) Dirty Looks
- (1986) In Your Face
- (1987) I Want More
- (1988) Cool from the Wire
- (1989) Turn of the Screw
- (1991) Bootlegs
- (1992) Five Easy Pieces
- (1993) Rumbledog (as Rumbledog)
- (1994) Chewing on the Bit
- (1995) One Bad Leg
- (1995) The Drowning Pool (as Rumbledog)
- (1996) Rip It Out!
- (1996) Slave to the Machine
- (1996) Taar (as Burning Orange)
- (1997) Thirteen (as Burning Orange)
- (2007) Gasoline
- (2008) Superdeluxe
- (2008) California Free Ride
- (2010) I.C.U.

=== EPs ===
- (1984) Dirty Looks EP

=== Live albums ===
- (2005) Live In San Diego
- (2021) Cool From The Speedway

=== Compilation albums ===
- (2009) The Worst of Dirty Looks

=== Singles ===
- "Can't Take My Eyes Off On You" (1988)
- "Oh Ruby" (1988)
- "Wastin' My Time" (1988)
- "Nobody Rides for Free" (1989)
- "Turn of the Screw" (1989)
- "Go Away" (1989)
- "Let It Rain" (1992)
- "Five Easy Pieces" (1992)

=== Remasters ===
- (1984) Dirty Looks
- (1994) One Bad Leg
- (2009) Slave to the Machine [Perris Records]
- (2010) Dirty Looks [FNA Records]
- (2010) In Your Face [FNA Records]
- (2010) I Want More [FNA Records]
- (2013) Cool from the Wire [Rock Candy Records]
- (2021) Bootlegs [Divebomb Records]
- (2022) Turn of the Screw [Rock Candy Records]
