= If (Mata Aetara) =

"If -Mata Aetara-"
- Standard edition/digital download cover

Single by Day6

from the album Unlock
- B-side: "Baby, It's Okay"
- Released: March 14, 2018
- Genre: J-pop; rock
- Length: 3:22
- Label: Warner Music Japan
- Songwriters: Chailhun; Sung-Jin; Wonpil; Young K

Day6 singles chronology
"I Like You" (2017)	"If -Mata Aetara-" (2018)

Alternative cover
- Limited edition cover

Music video
- "If -Mata Aetara-" on YouTube

"If -Mata Aetara-" (If ～また逢えたら～, If (I Could See You Again)) is a song recorded by South Korean band Day6. The song was released as the group's first Japanese CD single on March 14, 2018, by Warner Music Japan. Ahead of its release, the song was pre-released as a digital single on February 26, 2018. "If -Mata Aetara-" serves as the theme song for the Japanese television drama, Repeat (Unmei wo Kaeru 10 Kagetsu).

== Composition ==
The song is in the key of E Major and is 184 beats per minute.

== Track listing ==
No.	Title	Writer(s)	Length
1.	"If -Mata Aetara-"	Chailhun; Sungjin; Wonpil; Young K	3:22
2.	"Baby, It's Okay"	Hong Ji-Sang; Jae; Lee Woo-min 'Collapsedone'; Sungjin; Wonpil; YHANAEL; Young K	3:53
3.	"If -Mata Aetara-" (Instrumental)	Chailhun; Sungjin; Wonpil; Young K	3:21
4.	"Baby, It's Okay" (Instrumental)	Hong Ji-Sang; Jae; Lee Woo-min 'Collapsedone'; Sungjin; Wonpil; YHANAEL; Young K	3:53

Limited edition DVD
No.	Title	Length
1.	"If -Mata Aetara-" (Music video)
2.	"If -Mata Aetara-" (Music video making movie)

== Charts ==
=== Daily charts ===
Chart (2018)	Peak position
Japan (Oricon)	27

=== Weekly charts ===
Chart (2018)	Peak position
Japan (Oricon)	28

== Certification and sales ==
Region	Certification	Certified units/sales
Japan (RIAJ)	None	4,832 (physical sales)

== Release history ==
Region	Date	Format	Label	Ref.
Japan	February 26, 2018	Digital download (Pre-release)	Warner Music Japan	
Japan	March 14, 2018	CD single (Standard edition)	Warner Music Japan	
Japan	March 14, 2018	CD single/DVD (Limited edition)	Warner Music Japan	
Japan	March 14, 2018	Digital download	Warner Music Japan	
