= IMF International Financial Statistics =

Database maintained by the International Monetary Fund

The IMF International Financial Statistics (IFS) is a compilation of financial data collected from various sources, covering the economies of 194 countries and areas worldwide, which is published monthly by the International Monetary Fund (IMF).

== Methodology and scope ==
The IFS is the IMF’s principal statistical publication, covering numerous topics of international and domestic finance. It includes, for most countries, data on exchange rates, balance of payments, international liquidity, money and banking, interest rates, prices, etc. Most annual data begins in 1948, quarterly and monthly data dates back to 1957, and most balance of payments data begins in 1970.

The IMF compiles the data from various sources including government departments, national accounts, central banks, the United Nations (UN), Eurostat, the International Labour Organization (ILO), and private financial institutions.

== Accessing the data ==
The Economic and Social Data Service (ESDS) International provides the macro-economic datasets free of charge for members of UK higher and further education institutions. In order to access the data, users have to be registered, which can be done here. Alternatively, the data is available to explore and download free of charge on the IMF data portal. In addition, the IMF offers an API based on the SDMX standard for automated downloads.

== See also ==
- Classification of the Functions of Government
- ESDS International
