= Goreaphobia =

American death metal band

- Also known as: Infamy (1986–1988)
- Origin: Philadelphia, Pennsylvania, U.S.
- Genre: Death metal
- Years active: 1988–present
- Labels: Seraphic Decay, Relapse, Necroharmonic, Ibex Moon, Dark Descent

Goreaphobia, formed by Alex Bouks and Chris Gamble in 1988, is the first American death metal band from Philadelphia and one of the first to emerge from the East Coast scene. They never released a full-length record until after breaking up and reforming, only a demo cassette and two 7-inch EPs. Due to this fact, and their influence on later bands, Goreaphobia has reached a cult status in the underground, with demand for their merchandise still high. The band played many shows in the early 1990s and toured with Immolation on their 1992 "Tour of Possession".

After Goreaphobia's breakup, drummer Craig Smilowski joined Immolation, and Chris Gamble went on to form Blood Storm. Guitarist Alex Bouks joined Incantation.

The band reunited after 15 years of separation in 2007. After reforming they released their debut album, Mortal Repulsion, in 2009.

== Members ==
- Chris Gamble – bass, vocals (Blood Storm, Absu)
- Alex Bouks – lead guitar (Immolation, ex-Incantation, Ruinous)
- Jim Roe – drums (Disciples of Mockery, ex-Incantation)
- VJS – guitar (Nightbringer, Incursus, Adaestuo, Sargiest)

=== Former members ===
Drums:

- Craig Smilowski (Immolation)
- "Big" Mike
- Ken Masteller

Vocals:

- Kevin Brennan
- Jack Gannon
- Craig Pillard (Incantation)

Bass:

- Jay Lawrence
- Gary Gahndi
- Julian Lawrence

Guitar:

- Henny Piotrowski
- John Litchko
- John Arcuicci
- Spencer Murphy
- John McEntee (Incantation)

== Releases ==
- Morbidious Pathology (1990) (demo tape – self-released)
- Morbidious Pathology (1990) (7-inch EP on Seraphic Decay Records)
- Omen of Masochism (1992) (7-inch EP on Relapse Records)
- Vile Beast of Abomination (2006) (Necroharmonic)
- Mortal Repulsion (2009) (Ibex Moon)
- Apocalyptic Necromancy (2011)
