= IFS =

IFS may refer to:

== Commercial ==
- Chengdu International Finance Square (Chengdu IFS), a skyscraper in Chengdu, Sichuan, China
- Industrial and Financial Systems (IFS AB), a Swedish company and creator of enterprise software
- International Film Service, a short-lived animation studio owned by Hearst Communication

== Computer science ==
- Iterated function system, a method of constructing fractals in mathematics and computer science
- Internal field separator, a special set of characters in Unix shells
- Interference (intensity) fluctuation spectroscopy, related to dynamic light scattering
- Interframe spacing, a pause which may be required between network packets or network frames
- Installable File System, a filesystem API in IBM OS/2 and Microsoft Windows NT
- InfoPath Forms Services, a component of SharePoint Server that allows Microsoft Office InfoPath forms to be hosted in a SharePoint web site and serve and fill them using a browser-based interface

== Geographical ==
- Irish Free State, a state in Ireland which existed in the early part of the 20th century
- Ifs, Calvados, a commune of the département of Calvados, in the Normandie région, in France

== Government ==
- Indian Foreign Service, Diplomatic Service of the Government of India
- Indian Forest Service, All India Services of the Government of India

== Organisations ==
- ifs University College, a UK-based, non profit making body providing financial education
- Institut für Sexualwissenschaft
- Institute for Fiscal Studies, a UK-based independent economic research institute
- Institutt for Forsvarsstudier, the Norwegian Institute for Defence Studies
- Institut für Sozialforschung, the University of Frankfurt Institute for Social Research
- International Foundation for Science
- International French School Singapore
- International Futures
- International Sumo Federation
- Internationale Filmschule Köln, a filmschool in Cologne, Germany
- Islamic Foundation School

== Science ==
- Integral field spectroscopy, a technique for astronomical observations
- Integrated Forecast System a global meteorological model developed by European Centre for Medium-Range Weather Forecasts
- Isoflavonoid synthase, an enzyme

== Technology ==
- Independent Front Suspension, an early type of front-end independent suspension on many passenger vehicles
- Initial Flight Screening, flight screening used as a prerequisite for Air Force Flight School
- Intelligent Front-lighting System is a technology to ensure the visibility of the driver on the road ahead without blinding oncoming drivers with the partial light control capability.

== Other ==
- Internal Family Systems Model, a school of psychotherapy
- International Financial Statistics, a database maintained by the International Monetary Fund
- A retired US Navy hull classification symbol: Inshore fire support ship (IFS)
