= Intuit Interchange Format =

- Filename extension: .iif
- Internet media type: application/qbooks; application/qbookspro; text/iif

The IIF file format, Intuit Interchange Format is a proprietary text file used by Intuit's Quickbooks software for importing and exporting lists and transactions.
