= If (preposition) =

Word used in English for conditional constructions

If is an English preposition, as seen in If it's sunny tomorrow, (then) we'll have a picnic.

As a preposition, if normally takes a clausal complement (e.g., it's sunny tomorrow in if it's sunny tomorrow). That clause is, within the conditional construction, the condition (or protasis) on which the main clause (or apodosis) is contingent. In such cases, if can be paraphrased as "in case" or "contingent on the case that".

If it's sunny tomorrow is a preposition phrase, and within a conditional construction it functions as an adjunct.

Where if takes a noun phrase (NP) or adjective phrase (AdjP) complement, the construction is concessive rather than conditional: The ascent was exhilarating, if _{NP}[a challenge]/_{AdjP}[challenging]).

Traditional grammar books commonly treat if, often understood as a single word encompassing both this preposition and the homonymous subordinator, as a "subordinating conjunction", a category covering a broad range of clause-connecting words.

== See also ==
- Material conditional §Discrepancies with natural language
