= Saint (band) =

American Christian metal band

- Origin: Salem, Oregon, US
- Genres: Heavy metal, Christian metal
- Years active: 1980–1989; 1999–present
- Labels: Armor, Retroactive
- Members: Eli Prinsen; Jerry Johnson; Richard Lynch; Jared Knowland; Matt Smith
- Past members: Dave Nelson; Brian Phyll Miller; Josh Kramer; Dee Harrington; Tim Lamberson; John Mahan; Mike Lowery; Gene McClendon; Brian Willis; John Perrine; Larry London; Bill Brost

Saint is an American Christian metal band, first active in the mid-1980s, releasing their first album Warriors of the Son in 1984. Common themes of Saint's music include hell, evil, and apocalyptic themes such as the End times. In 2010, HM magazine ranked the band's albums Time's End and Hell Blade among Top 100 Christian metal albums of all-time list on No. 67 and No. 46 respectively.

== Line up ==
Current members

- Dave Nelson – vocals
- Richard Lynch – bass
- Jared Knowland – drums
- Matthew P. Smith – guitars

Former members

- Eli Prinsen - vocals
- Brian Miller – vocals
- Josh Kramer – vocals
- Dee Harrington – guitars
- Jerry Johnson - guitars
- Tim Lamberson – vocals, drums
- John Mahan – guitars, backing vocals
- Gene McClendon – drums
- Brian Willis – drums
- John Perrine – drums
- Larry London – drums
- Mike Lowery – drums
- Nick Bean – drums
- Bill Brost – drums
- Russell Koch – bass
- Jim Maxwell – drums

== Discography with track listing ==
=== Warriors of the Son (1984 Rotten) ===
1. "Plan II"
2. "Legions of the Dead"
3. "Abyss"
4. "Warriors of the Son"
5. "Vicars of Fate"
6. "Time's Wasting"

=== Time's End (1986 Pure Metal) ===
1. "In the Night"
2. "Island Prisoner"
3. "Space Cruiser"
4. "Through You"
5. "Time's End"
6. "Primed and Ready"
7. "Destroyers"
8. "Phantom of the Galaxy/Steel Killer"
9. "Steel Killer (reprise)"

=== Too Late for Living (1988 Pure Metal/2000 Armor) ===
1. "Too Late for Living"
2. "Star Pilot"
3. "Accuser"
4. "The Rock"
5. "On the Street"
6. "Returning"
7. "The Path"
8. "Through the Sky"
9. "The War Is Over"

=== The Perfect Life (EP) (1999 Armor) ===
1. "The Runner"
2. "Raise Your Hands"
3. "Show His Love"
4. "To Live Forever"
5. "The Perfect Life"
6. "Deceived"

=== In the Battle (2003 Armor) ===
1. "In the Battle"
2. "Star Pilots Return"
3. "Here We Are"
4. "Sacrifice"
5. "Holy Rollin'"
6. "Ryders"
7. "The Choice"
8. "When"
9. "Acid Rain/Full Armor"

=== Warriors of the Son (Re-Recorded) (2004 Armor) ===
1. "Plan II"
2. "Legions of the Dead"
3. "Abyss"
4. "Warriors of the Son"
5. "Vicars of Fate"
6. "Time's Wasting"
7. "Killers & the Destroyers"
8. "The Reaper"

=== Live 05 (2005 Armor) ===
1. "Sacrifice"
2. "Vicars of Fate"
3. "In the Battle"
4. "Holy Rollin'"
5. "The Path"
6. "In the Night"
7. "Warriors of the Son"
8. "Here We Are"
9. "Too Late for Living"
10. "Primed and Ready"
11. "Ryders"
12. "Full Armor"
13. "Plan II"

=== The Mark (2006 Armor) ===
1. "The Spirit"
2. "The Vision"
3. "Ride to Kill"
4. "He Reigns"
5. "On & On"
6. "The 7th Trumpet"
7. "The Mark"
8. "Bowls of Wrath"
9. "Babylon the Great"
10. "Reaping the Flesh"
11. "Gog & Magog"
12. "Alfa & Omega"

=== Crime Scene Earth (2007 Armor) ===
1. "The Conquest"
2. "Half a Times Measure"
3. "Terror in the Sky"
4. "Everlasting God"
5. "Crime Scene Earth"
6. "The Judas in Me"
7. "Too Many"
8. "Invader"
9. "Bended Knee"
10. "Lost"

=== Hell Blade (2010 Retroactive) ===
1. "The Ascent"
2. "The Blade"
3. "To the Cross"
4. "Crying in the Night"
5. "Hell Train"
6. "Endless Night"
7. "You and Me"
8. "New World Order"
9. "SinnerPeace"
10. "Hell Blade"

=== Desperate Night (AMOR) 2012 ===
1. "The Crucible"
2. "Crusified"
3. "The Key"
4. "End of the World"
5. "Let It Rock"
6. "In the Fray"
7. "Inside Out"
8. "Desperate Night"
9. "Zombie Shuffle (Josh Kramer)"
10. "Judgement"
11. "To Live Forever"
12. "Escape from the Fire"
13. "The Crucible Reprise"

=== Broad is the Gate Armor(2014) ===
1. "Broad is the Gate"
2. "Hero"
3. "We All Stand"
4. "Demon Pill"
5. "We Will Fight"
6. "Who You Are"
7. "Reach the Sky"
8. "Never Same"
9. "Metal Cross"

=== The Calf Armor(2019) ===
1. "The Calf"
2. "Another Day"
3. "Psalm 23"
4. "Rise"
5. "Fine Line"
6. "Stormy Night"
7. "Fragile"
8. "Hell to Pay"
9. "The Fall"
10. "God Is God"

=== Heaven Fell Retroactive(2022) ===
1. "Holier Than Thou"
2. "Creature"
3. "Dance Of The Gods"
4. "Make Believe"
5. "Chosen One "
6. "Vengeance"
7. "Fallen Armor"
8. "The Exile Of Cain"
9. "Words Of Wisdom"
10. "Heaven Fell"

=== Immortalizer Armor(2024) ===
1. "Immortalizer"
2. "Repent"
3. "My Cemetery"
4. "Eye's of Fire"
5. "The Congregation"
6. "Pit of Sympathy"
7. "Into the Kingdom"
8. "The Loyal"
9. "Blood of God"
10. "Where's the Faith"
11. "Salt in the Wounds"
