= Hypertrace =

- Cover art by Joachim Luetke

Studio album by Scanner
- Released: April 1988
- Recorded: January–March 1988
- Studio: Horus Sound Studio, Hanover, Germany
- Genre: Speed metal, power metal
- Length: 38:07
- Label: Noise
- Producer: Frank Bornemann

Scanner chronology
Hypertrace (1988)	Terminal Earth (1989)

Professional ratings
Review scores
Source	Rating
AllMusic	2.5/5 stars

Hypertrace is the debut studio album by the German power metal band Scanner, released through Noise Records in 1988. It is a concept album with a science fiction storyline.

== Story ==
During World War II, the military ordered the formation of a commando troop out of seven convicts. With scientific help these seven were trained and genetically manipulated to become a super combat unit.

The mutant soldiers went berserk, and directed all their strength and superior skills against their commanders. The rebels had to be annihilated ("Grapes of Fear"), so they were shot into space, and their rockets exploded, except one ("Locked Out"), which was found by aliens ("Wizard Force"). The aliens taught the mutant survivor to bring peace to the world ("Retaliation Positive").

== Track listing ==
All lyrics by Michael Knoblich. Music as indicated

1. "Warp 7" (Tom S. Sopha, Axel Julius, Martin Bork, Michael Knoblich) – 4:27
2. "Terrion" (Julius) – 4:53
3. "Locked Out" (Julius) – 6:23
4. "Across the Universe" (Julius, Bork, Knoblich) – 3:52
5. "R.M.U." (Sopha, Julius, Bork, Knoblich) – 5:46
6. "Grapes of Fear" (Julius, Sopha, Knoblich) – 3:58
7. "Retaliation Positive" (Julius, Bork, Knoblich) – 4:25
8. "Killing Fields" (Sopha, Julius, Bork, Knoblich) – 4:23
9. "Wizard Force" (Sopha, Julius) – 4:25 (CD release bonus track)
10. "Galactos" (Sopha, Julius, Bork, Knoblich) – 3:45 (Japanese release bonus track)

Track #10, "Galactos" is only available on the Japanese re-release and the metal sampler Doomsday News vol.1. According to Axel Julius, the band's only remaining original member, "Galactos" was not included on the original release because it was recorded during a different recording session and has a noticeably different sound when compared to the other songs on the album. The song was featured as track one on Noise's 1988 Doomsday News compilation.

The songs as arranged on the album are not in conceptual or chronological order. The correct conceptual order reported in the CD booklet is as follows:

1. "Grapes of Fear"
2. "Locked Out"
3. "Across the Universe"
4. "Wizard Force"
5. "Retaliation Positive"
6. "Galactos"
7. "Warp 7"
8. "Killing Fields"
9. "R.M.U."
10. "Terrion"

== Personnel ==
Band members

- Michael Knoblich (M.A.J.O.R.) – vocals
- Tom S. Sopha – guitars
- Axel Julius (A.J.) – guitars
- Martin Bork – bass guitar
- Wolfgang Kolorz – drums

Guest musicians

- Ralf Scheepers — additional vocal on "Locked Out"

Production

- Frank Bornemann – producer
- Tommy Newton – engineer, mixing
- Bernd Schmidt, Ralf Krause – engineers
