= Femme Fatale (Femme Fatale album) =

Studio album by Femme Fatale
- Released: November 1988
- Genres: Hard rock, glam metal
- Length: 39:15
- Label: MCA
- Producers: Jim Faraci (tracks 2–10); David N. Cole (track 1)

Femme Fatale chronology
Femme Fatale (1988)	One More for the Road (2016)

Femme Fatale is the debut studio album by American hard rock band Femme Fatale, released in 1988 through MCA Records. It peaked at No. 141 on the Billboard 200 the following year.

The song "Touch and Go" was featured on the soundtrack of the 1988 film License to Drive. The CD was reissued in September 2022 by Rock Candy Records with 4 bonus tracks.

== Track listing ==
1. "Waiting for the Big One" (Rick Neigher, David N. Cole) – 4:23
2. "Falling In & Out of Love" (Mazzi Rawd, Lorraine Lewis) – 3:48
3. "My Baby's Gun" (Rawd, Lewis) – 3:35
4. "Back in Your Arms Again" (Rawd, Lewis, Mick Nichols) – 4:18
5. "Rebel" (Reg Laws) – 4:28
6. "Fortune & Fame" (Rawd) – 3:34
7. "Touch and Go" (Rawd, Lewis, Danny Wilde) – 4:07
8. "If" (Rawd, Lewis) – 3:56
9. "Heat the Fire" (Rawd, Lewis) – 3:52
10. "Cradle's Rockin'" (Rawd, Lewis) – 3:14

== Personnel ==
=== Band members ===
- Lorraine Lewis – lead vocals, tambourine
- Bill D'Angelo – guitar
- Mazzi Rawd – guitar, keyboards, backing vocals
- Rick Rael – bass, backing vocals
- Bobby Murray – drums, backing vocals

=== Production ===
- Jim (H. M.) Faraci – producer
- David N. Cole – producer, engineer and mixing of track 1, mixing of track 2
- Charlie Brocco – engineer
- Brian Foraker – mixing of tracks 3 and 4
- Greg Fulginti – mastering
