= Roger Dale Martin =

- Born: June 20
- Origin: Oklahoma, United States
- Genres: Thrash metal, speed metal, power metal, heavy metal, Christian metal
- Occupation: Musician
- Instruments: Bass, Backing vocals
- Years active: 1984–present
- Labels: Medusa, Frontline, Intense

Roger Dale Martin, or more commonly known as Roger Dale, is a heavy metal musician who has performed with several acts, including Vengeance Rising and Once Dead.

== History ==
Roger Dale Martin was born on June 19, in Oklahoma. At the age of 12 he was playing in bands, as he did throughout and even after his High School years. He worked for a construction company, which traveled to several different states, where he would form new bands. One job took him to California, where he met David Enos and joined the band Emerald. He recorded on the band's debut EP, Armed for Battle, and following its completion, moved on from the band. After finishing his stint with Emerald, he played a few shows with Holy Right before leaving that band.

Martin then went on to play for Sanctuary Church's band – Sanctuary Celebration Band – for a brief time in 1986. Afterward, Martin was introduced to Doug Thieme, who started Sacrifice with Martin. The two brought in Thieme's friend Larry Farkas, who was in Deliverance. The three then began searching for a drummer and vocalist to play for the band. Originally, the three found Steve Bertram on Drums and Sharon on Vocals. Bertram left the band, and was replaced by Mike Betts of Neon Cross. However, Sharon and Betts both departed. The group then found Glen Mancaruso, who agreed to play for the band temporarily until they could find a more permanent drummer, and Glenn Rogers on guitars. The group wrote some material and were introduced to Vocalist Roger Martinez by Pastor Bob Beeman. Rogers left the band, but after writing a majority of the songs. With the lineup of Martin, Thieme, Farkas, Mancaruso and Martinez, the band now known as Vengeance Rising began recording their debut album, Human Sacrifice.

The band toured around and signed to Medusa Records, which then got bought out by the Christian label, Intense Records, a subsidiary of Frontline Records. The band played several shows and got secular distribution and became respected by many metal bands. In 1990, the band recorded and released Once Dead. While supporting the album on the Once Dead Tour, the band members, including Martin, felt a disconnect with Martinez. After the tour finished, the four signed over all debts to Martinez, which he agreed to. The ordeal was documented in Heaven's Metal Magazine. Much drama followed after this, with Martinez blaming the members of the band as stealing from him and abandoning him with all the debt.

Martin then joined Triple Ace, a ministry based biker band, which was a part of Bikers for Christ. Several months later, the four formed a project called Die Happy with former Joshua vocalist Robin Basuri and recorded a self-titled album, which was released in 1992. Martin departed from Die Happy in 1993, as he was moving to Nashville and started a ministry band called Pond Scum. Not much else was heard from Martin musically until 2004, when the four members of Vengeance attempted to do a reunion show with the band and Scott Waters of Ultimatum on vocals. The group were sued by Martinez, claiming he owned the rights to the name.

Since the band could not play as Vengeance, they formed under the name of Once Dead and released a DVD titled Return With a Vengeance. However, by 2006, a three members of the band - Mancaruso, Waters and Martin - departed from the band.

In August 2017, it was announced that Vengeance Rising would be reuniting for So Cal Metal Fest in honor of Dale Huffman, a radio show host of Metal Pulse Radio and writer at Untombed Zine. The band also re-released Human Sacrifice on vinyl for the 30th Anniversary of the album. Martin also had personal hand written notes within the 30 year pressing on the album. The band performed at the Festival with the original lineup, with Jim Settle (ex-Tantrum of the Muse, Hand of Fire) on vocals. The band, as this incarnation, are currently working on new material and have gained a record deal in the process. Later, it was announced, that the band would be going under the name of Once Dead, reviving their old project with Jim Settle and Roger Sampson (ex-Precious Death) on Vocals and Drums respectively. In 2019, it was announced that Emerald would reunite, with Martin being a part of the lineup once more.In 2021 Martin was introduced to Nick Layton of Firewolfe. the resulting musical creation was titled Roxology, an instrumental album of traditional Christian hymns. Spurred on by the success of Roxology, Layton and Martin began building a hard rock/ metal album. Vocalist Robyn Kyle Basauri (Die Happy) was recruited and so was Jim Chaffin (The Crucified) on drums. Reign of Glory is the band and the album is entitled "All Will Bow". Reign of Glory was invited to the Immortal Fest in 2023 with Luke Easter (Tourniquet)fronting the band. Both fans and critics gave a great review of the show propelling the band into 2024. @

== Personal life ==
Roger Dale Martin is an outspoken Christian. He has been described by reviews as having a fun presence and as a fantastic bass player.

== Bands ==
Current

- Reign of Glory (2022–present)

Former

- Emerald (1984-1986, 2019
- Once Dead (2004-2006)
- Vengeance Rising (1987–1990)
- Layton & Martin (2021)
- Holy Right (1986)
- Sanctuary Celebration Band (1986)
- Triple Ace (1990)
- Die Happy (1990-1993)
- Pond Scum (1994-1996)

== Discography ==
Emerald

- Armed for Battle (1987)
- Selah/Armed for Battle (2001)

Vengeance Rising

- Human Sacrifice (1988)
- Vengeance (1988)
- Hot Metal Summer II (1989)
- Once Dead (1990)

Die Happy

- Die Happy (1992)

Once Dead

- Return with a Vengeance DVD (2005)
- Return with a Vengeance: Live in Anaheim (2010)
- Ghost Tribe (2019)

Layton & Martin

- Roxology (2021)

Reign of Glory

- 'All Will Bow (2022)
