= Larry Farkas =

American guitarist

- Born: May 2, 1966 (age 60); California, U.S.
- Genres: Thrash metal, speed metal, Christian metal, power metal, industrial
- Occupation: Guitarist
- Years active: 1985–present

Larry Farkas (born May 2, 1966) is an American guitarist who primarily performs thrash metal. He was a member of Christian bands Vengeance Rising, Deliverance, Holy Soldier, and Once Dead, many of which he started.

== History ==
Farkas presumably started his musical career in the Christian rock band Holy Soldier. He was only briefly in the band before bandmate Chris Hyde asked him to join Deliverance, a band Hyde was in. Farkas joined Deliverance and was in the band until 1987.

After his departure from Deliverance, Farkas joined the band Vengeance Rising, then known as Vengeance. In 1988, the band released their debut album titled Human Sacrifice. The band's name, Vengeance, got the band into legal trouble, so they changed it to Vengeance Rising. In 1990, Vengeance released Once Dead.

After the release, Farkas, Guitarist Doug Theime, Bassist Roger Dale Martin and Drummer Glen Mancaruso left the band and formed the band Die Happy. Ever since departing from the band, Farkas, along with Thieme, Mancaruso, and Dale Martin, have all expressed interest in reuniting for a Vengeance concert. Which they tried to do in later years but would have been sued for continuing. Die Happy formed in 1990 with the former Vengeance members and Robyn Basauri (ex-Joshua). In 1993 Martin left and was replaced by Greg Chaisson. In 1994, the band disbanded. During the time Farkas was in Die Happy, he also performed in Sircle of Silence.

In 2002, Farkas along with Mancaruso and Deliverance/Recon guitarist George Ochoa started a modern rock band called S.A.L.T. which was very short lived. In 2004, Farkas reunited with his former Vengeance members, minus Roger Martinez, along with Scott Waters of Ultimatum. The band was to play two shows, but Martinez threatened to sue over the concerts, as he owned the rights to the name. The band then continued the band under the moniker, Once Dead, named after the Vengeance album of the same name. In 2005, the band released a DVD of their live set, called Return With a Vengeance. Scott Waters (ex-Once Dead, Ultimatum) stated that on this first release, Farkas was not heard very well at all. After the release of Return With a Vengeance, Mancaruso left the band.

Jim Chaffin of The Crucified fame took over drums as well as Glenn Rogers, Farkas' fellow Deliverance alumni, coming on as third guitarist. The next year, 2006, both Waters and Martin left the band and was replaced by Devin Schaefer (Fasedown) and Angelo Espino (Hirax). The band then started the recording of their full-length. During this process, the band signed to Open Grave Records. Farkas had issues with the label and refused to work with them and therefore quit.

By the time Farkas quit, Thieme was the last remaining original member. In April 2008, the band announced that Farkas had rejoined the band. In 2010, Farkas was asked by Klank to be on his new album along with Jim Chaffin (The Crucified) and Mike Phillips (Deliverance). In 2015, Farkas recorded lead guitar on a track for the band Worldview. In 2016, Farkas performed as a special guest for the long-awaited return of Bloodgood.

On August 6, 2017, it was announced that Vengeance Rising would reunite for SoCal Metal Fest with the original lineup, Farkas included, with Jim Settle of Hand of Fire on vocals. Later that week, it was announced that Farkas was a part of a new thrash metal supergroup known as Disciples of God, or D.O.G. alongside Holy Soldier and Neon Cross members.

== Bands ==
Current

- Disciples of God - lead guitars (2017–present)
- Vengeance Rising – lead guitar (1987–1990, 2004, 2017–present)
- Neon Cross – rhythm guitar (2012–present)
- Once Dead - lead guitars (2004-2007, 2008–present)

Former

- Holy Soldier – guitar (1985)
- Sanctuary Celebration Band – guitar (1986)
- Deliverance – lead guitar (1985–1987)
- Die Happy – lead guitar (1990–1994)
- Sircle of Silence – guitars (1993–1995)
- S.A.L.T. - bass (2002-2004)

Live

- Bloodgood – guitars (2016)

== Discography ==
Vengeance Rising

- Human Sacrifice (1988; Frontline/Intense)
- Once Dead (1990; Frontline/Intense)

Sircle of Silence

- Sircle of Silence (1993)
- Sircle of Silence (demo) (1993)
- Suicide Candyman (1994; Escape Music)

Die Happy

- Die Happy (1992; Frontline/Intense)
- Volume II (1993; Frontline/Intense)
- Intense Live Series Vol. 4 (1993; Frontline/Intense)

Once Dead

- Return With a Vengeance (2005)
- Visions of Hell (2008; Open Grave)

D.O.G.

- Unleashed (2017)

Guest appearances

- Master's Command by Sacred Warrior (1989)
- Live, Rare and Raw by Holy Soldier (2006)
- NUMB... Reborn by Klank (2010)
- The Chosen Few by Worldview (2015)
- Frosthardr by Frosthardr (2018)
