= Die Happy (American band) =

American Christian rock band

- Origin: United States
- Genres: Christian rock, Christian metal
- Years active: 1990–1994
- Spinoff of: Vengeance Rising
- Past members: Larry Farkas; Doug Thieme; Glen Mancaruso; Roger Dale Martin; Robyn Kyle Basauri; Greg Chaisson

Die Happy was an American Christian rock band. The group was formed in 1990 when Vengeance Rising members Larry Farkas, Doug Thieme, Glen Mancaruso, and Roger Dale Martin split the band, citing unrest with that band's front man and vocalist, Roger Martinez. They hired Robyn Kyle Basauri, formerly of Jaguar, as a vocalist and he officially joined the band after the release of their eponymous debut.

At the time of their first album the band was seen as "Vengeance Rising with a new Vocalist". For their second release, however, their sound changed to more of a hard, classic rock sound. Lyrically, the band was socially focused. Songs dealt with issues such as Magic Johnson and HIV-AIDS ("Real") and American Indian massacres ("Painted Truth").

== Related Projects ==
Following the demise of Die Happy, Robyn Kyle Basauri and bassist Greg Chaisson formed the band Red Sea. Hiring Chris Howell on guitar and Jeff Martin on drums, the band released one album, Blood, on Rugged Records in 1994. They were initially scheduled for a support tour with Ken Tamplin, but were dropped in favor of Greg X. Volz. Musically, they were compared to the English band Deep Purple.

Larry Farkas, Glen Mancaruso, Roger Dale Martin, and Doug Thieme had reformed under the new name Once Dead with the addition of Ultimatum vocalist Scott Waters. Originally planning to be a reunion, Martinez owned the original rights to the name. Instead of fighting for the rights to "Vengeance Rising," they instead used the name "Once Dead". Once Dead has released one album so far, Visions of Hell. The line up for this release included Jim Chaffin (The Crucified, The Blamed, Facedown, Deliverance) on drums and Devin Schaeffer (Fasedown) on vocals. A follow-up album has been delayed due to a vocal condition of Schaeffer's.

== Discography ==
- 1992: Die Happy (Intense Records, Review: Cross Rhythms)
- 1993: Volume 2 (Intense Records)
- 1993: Intense Live Series Vol. 4 (Intense Records)

== Members ==
Current

- Robyn Kyle Basauri – vocals (1990–1994)
- Larry Farkas – guitars (1990–1994)
- Doug Thieme – guitars (1990–1994)
- Glen Mancaruso – drums (1990–1994)
- Greg Chaisson – bass (1993–1994)

Former

- Roger Dale Martin – bass (1990–1993), lead guitar (1993) [live]

Live musicians

- Andy Robbins – bass (1993)
