= Once Dead (band) =

American metal band

- Origin: Los Angeles, California, United States
- Genres: Christian metal, thrash metal, death metal
- Years active: 2004–present
- Label: Open Grave
- Spinoff of: Vengeance Rising
- Members: Jim Settle; Doug Thieme; Larry Farkas; Roger Dale Martin; Roger Sampson
- Past members: Scott Waters; Devin Shaeffer; Glenn Rogers; Angelo Espino; Jim Chaffin; Glen Mancaruso

Once Dead is a Christian metal band that originated in Los Angeles, California. The band has played at Festivals such as Up From The Ashes, Elements of Rock Festival and Nordic Fest.

== History ==
The band started as a reunion for Vengeance Rising a band that original members, Larry Farkas, Doug Thieme, Roger Dale Martin and Glen Mancaruso had all performed in. All the members quit Vengeance at the same time and formed the band Die Happy. The members decided they wanted to reunite the band minus original vocalist Roger Martinez, who threatened to sue over the reunion.

Soon after those two shows as Vengeance, the band changed their name to Once Dead after one of Vengeance's album. In 2005, the band released a DVD titled Return with a Vengeance. Soon after the release, Glen Mancaruso departed from the band and was replaced by The Crucified drummer, Jim Chaffin.

In 2006, Former Deliverance and Vengeance guitarist Glenn Rogers joined the band and quit the band Hirax.

In September 2006, Once Dead announced the departure of vocalist Scott Waters because of the distance in between where he and the other members lived.

After Waters departure, the band announced that Devin Shaeffer, of the Christian metalcore band Fasedown, would be taking over. In 2007, the band announced an update on the recording process.

In April 2007, the band announced signing to Open Grave Records. In the announcement, it was mentioned that Angelo Espino was the new bass player, hinting that bassist Roger Dale Martin had quit.

In May 2007, the band announced the departure of original lead guitarist Larry Farkas. Farkas stated that he quit the band as he refused to work with Open Grave Records. Shaeffer stated that the band had to rewrite all the parts that Farkas had written. After Farkas left the last known lineup was vocalist Devin Shaeffer, guitarist Doug Thieme (the only remaining original member), guitarist Glenn Rogers, bassist Angelo Espino, and drummer Jim Chaffin. In April 2008, the band announced that Farkas had rejoined the band.

In June 2008, the band announced the completion of their album, Visions of Hell. After the album release, the band has been inactive with members performing in The Crucified, Deliverance, Hirax, and Ultimatum.

In 2017, Once Dead reunited as Vengeance Rising for the So Cal Metal Fest, with the original lineup, minus Roger Martinez. The band hired Jim Settle (Hand of Fire, ex-Tantrum of the Muse) as their vocalist. After the show, the band began working on changing their name. However, they went back to the name of Once Dead, which meant that Espino, Schaeffer, Rogers, and Chaffin were no longer a part of the lineup. The band is currently recording another album with Producer Juan Urtega. It was later announced that Roger Sampson of Precious Death would be taking over on drums.

== Members ==
Current
Name	Instrument	Years	Other groups
Jim Settle	vocals	2018–present	Vengeance Rising, Hand of Fire, Tantrum of the Muse, Bore, Intercessor, Slag
Doug Thieme	rhythm guitar	2004–present	Vengeance Rising, Die Happy
Larry Farkas	lead guitar	2004–2007, 2008–present	Vengeance Rising, Deliverance, Die Happy, Holy Soldier, S.A.L.T.
Roger Dale Martin	bass	2004–2006, 2018–present	Emerald, Holy Right, Vengeance Rising, Die Happy
Roger Sampson	drums	2018–present	Precious Death

Former
Name	Instrument	Years	Other groups
Scott Waters	vocals	2004–2006	Ultimatum
Devin Shaeffer	vocals	2006–2018	Fasedown
Glenn Rogers	rhythm guitar	2006–2008	Deliverance, Hirax, Heretic
Angelo Espino	bass	2006–2018	Heretic, Hirax, Uncle Slam
Jim Chaffin	drums	2005–2018	The Crucified, Deliverance, the Blamed, the Satire, Fasedown
Glen Mancaruso	drums	2004–2005, 2018	Vengeance Rising, Die Happy, S.A.L.T.

Timeline

== Discography ==
Studio albums

- Visions of Hell (October 28, 2008)

EPs

- Ghost Tribe (2019)

DVDs

- Return with a Vengeance (2005)
