= The Sacrificed =

- Origin: Lakeland, Florida
- Genres: Heavy metal, Christian metal, power metal, progressive metal, hard rock
- Years active: 2005–present
- Labels: Roxx
- Members: Eli Prinsen; Michael Phillips; Daniel Cordova; Jay Williams
- Past members: Johnny Bowden
- Website: facebook.com/thesacrificed

The Sacrificed is an American Christian metal band who primarily play a power metal and progressive metal music. They come from Lakeland, Florida, where they started making music in 2005, with frontman Eli Prinsen. They released two studio albums, 2012 in 2010 and III in 2012, both with Roxx Productions.

== Background ==
The Sacrificed is a Christian metal band from Lakeland, Florida, where they formed in 2005. Their members are lead vocalist, Eli Prinsen, lead guitarist, Michael Phillips, bassist, Daniel Cordova, and drummer, Jay Williams, with their past member being guitarist, Johnny Bowden.

== Music history ==
The band formed in 2005, Their first release, an album called The DaVinci Hoax, was released independently in 2007. They released 2012, a studio album, on June 22, 2010, with Roxx Productions. Their subsequent studio album, III, was released by Roxx Productions, on January 31, 2012.

== Members ==
Current members

- Eli Prinson - lead vocals (ex-Sacred Warrior)
- Michael Phillips - lead guitar (ex-Deliverance, ex-Fasedown)
- Daniel Cordova - bass (ex-Vengeance Rising, The Slave Eye, ex-Heretic, Shades of Crimson)
- Jay Williams - drums

Former members

- Johnny Bowden - guitar

== Discography ==
Studio albums

- 2012 (June 22, 2010, Roxx)
- III (January 31, 2012, Roxx)
