= Worldview (band) =

American musical group

Wordview
- Origin: Los Angeles, California
- Genres: Heavy metal; Christian metal; power metal; progressive metal
- Years active: 2013–present
- Label: M24
- Members: George Rene Ochoa; Todd Libby; Terry Russel; Rey Parra
- Past members: Ray Vidal; Johnny Gonzales; Ronson Webster; Alessandro Bertoni
- Website: worldviewmetalband.com

Worldview is an American Christian metal band, while they make heavy metal, power metal, and progressive metal music, and they started making music together in 2013. They have released two studio albums, The Chosen Few (2015) and Invincible (2025) with M24 Music Group.

== Background ==
The band originated in Los Angeles, California, in January 2013, after the death of a mutual friend, Rick Macias, who was the keyboardist for Sacred Warrior. Worldviews lead vocalist, Rey Parra, also a member of Sacred Warrior with Marcias, and George Rene Ochoa, a guitarist, keyboardist, and background vocalist for Worldview, also played in bands such as Vengeance Rising, Deliverance, Mortification, and Recon. Other members of Worldview consisted of bassist and keyboardist, Todd Libby and drummer, Johnny Gonzales. Ronson Webster, a singer-songwriter and former keyboardist for Recon and Barren Cross, took on the role as lead vocalist for the band in 2019. Webster has co-wrote several songs with Ochoa such as "Alive", "Lost Soldier", "Take Us Away", "Mortality", "The Mirror", "Prisoner of Pain", "Back in Time", "Illusions of Love" and "The Chosen Few". Webster also sang background vocals on albums; Recon - Behind Enemy Lines and Worldview - The Chosen Few.

== Music history ==
The band has released two studio albums, The Chosen Few, on May 26, 2015, with M24 and Invincible on October 17, 2025 with Girder Music.

== Members ==
Current

- Rey Parra - lead vocals (2013–present)
- George Rene Ochoa – guitar, keyboards, background vocals (2013–present)
- Todd Libby – bass guitar, keyboards (2013–present)
- Terry Russel - drums background vocals (2018–present)

Former

- Ronson Webster - lead vocals, keyboards (2018–2019)
- Ray Vidal - guitars, backing vocals (2013–2014)
- Johnny Gonzales - drums, percussion (2013–2017)
- Glen Mancaruso - drums (2017–2018)
- Alessandro Bertoni - keyboards (2019)

Timeline

== Discography ==
- The Chosen Few (May 26, 2015, M24)
- Invincible (October 17, 2025)
