= Once Dead =

Once Dead may refer to:

- Once Dead (band), a Christian metal band
- Once Dead (album), a 1990 album by Vengeance Rising
