= Vengeance Rising =

American thrash metal band

- Origin: Los Angeles, California, US
- Genres: Thrash metal, Christian metal (early)
- Years active: 1987–1992, 2000–2004
- Label: Intense
- Spinoffs: Die Happy; Once Dead
- Members: Larry Farkas; Doug Thieme; Roger Dale Martin; Glen Mancaruso; Jim Settle
- Past members: Chris Hyde; Derek Sean; Jamie Mitchell; Victor Macias; Jimmy P. Brown II; Johnny Vasquez; George Ochoa; Daniel Cordova; Michael Wagel; Glenn Rogers; Roger Martinez

Vengeance Rising was an American Christian thrash metal band from Los Angeles, California. Fronted by vocalist Roger Martinez, they formed as Vengeance in 1987, but changed their name in 1989 to avoid conflict with a band from the Netherlands. Band members Larry Farkas, Doug Thieme, Roger Dale Martin, and Glen Mancaruso left following Once Dead and formed the band Die Happy. Roger Martinez stayed on to record two more studio albums. Aside from him, Vengeance Rising's lineup changed for each subsequent album. A once groundbreaking Christian metal band, Vengeance Rising is known for vocalist Martinez's conversion from Christianity to Satanism to atheism. AllMusic describes Vengeance Rising's history as "one of the most entertaining and bizarre stories in the realm of heavy metal."

== Biography ==
The band was known for the violent themes and lyrics in their first two albums before the split into Die Happy,. These albums are considered their best. HM Magazine editor Doug Van Pelt called their debut, Human Sacrifice, "the most radical Christian album ever released". Their violence streak extended to their stage shows, where they would reenact the crucifixion of Christ. Extreme graphics appeared in the cover art of the band's albums. Both Human Sacrifice and Once Dead were censored by Christian bookstores at least partially because of their graphic content. Copies of their third release, Destruction Comes, had a censorship sticker covering the male figure, dubbed "Raegoul", exposing half of his flesh without skin.

A review of Once Dead in CCM found that the cover of that album's depiction of "resurrection from spiritual death" was "grisly". Musically, the album showed an influence of speed metal, with thrash arrangements on some songs, like the cover of Deep Purple's Space Truckin', and "Out of the Will", which reminded one reviewer of One Bad Pig. While the vocals often sounded "like someone gargling razor blades", the lyrics were found to be "very Bible based," and matched with the scriptural references from which they were drawn.

Frontman Roger Martinez had a background in the Pentecostal Foursquare Church, and was baptized there. He eventually rose to be pastor of a Hollywood area church, though by Released Upon the Earth he had left to pursue music full-time. While there, he began to look into the practice of faith healing, and he claimed to have found it to be a fraud.

In the mid 1990s, Martinez left the Christian faith, telling HM that he was a committed atheist in 1997. There were rumors at this time that it is possible that he was never a Christian and was putting on a performance. Today, Martinez has obtained rights to the band name for future projects. According to Scott Waters and Steve Rowe, Martinez began to make tapes counteracting the tapes he made during his Christian career. He created a website that renounced his previous output and posted articles portraying Christian leaders in a negative light. Martinez then began making death threats to individuals he claimed "stabbed him in the back", which included friend Steve Rowe of Mortification, a band Martinez helped get their first record contract.

Although he has stated that he was working on an album to be released under the name "Vengeance Rising" with more of an anti-Christian, Satanic Atheism theme, the album, reportedly titled Realms of Blasphemy, has never been released. The album had a strong satanic and anti-Christian theme, sporting titles such as: "Synagogues for Satan" and "Blaspheme the Holy Ghost".

In 2007, Shannon Frye did an interview where they mentioned his time in Vengeance. He stated

I quit shortly after I joined which was 1998. As far as I know, there was no album recorded. But I don't know much about it if there was, because I just wanted nothing to do with that excuse called a "band" after I quit. I thought it would have been a great opportunity at the time I joined, but that faded quickly. I just don't like to get into this subject. This is one of those things I wish never happened and would love to erase that from any history ever!

After the September 11, 2001 attacks occurred, Martinez offered free albums from his website for military personnel to encourage a "holy war against Christians". Former fans and critics believe this to be an attack on former bandmates and Christianity, due to the straining situation of debt that he was left with when band members departed after the "Once Dead Tour". However, the former band members - Farkas, Thieme, Martin and Mancaruso - spoke out against the claims that Martinez put out. Martinez stated that the four of them had stolen from him. Despite this, the four of them stated that they never stole equipment and that he took all responsibility for the debts of Vengeance, which he agreed to. This was covered in an issue of Heaven's Metal Magazine, with Doug Van Pelt interviewing all of them.

Former founding members of Vengeance Rising along with Ultimatum vocalist Scott Waters reformed in 2004 to play a reunion show at a small club called Chain Reaction in Anaheim, California. Since Martinez owns the rights to the name "Vengeance Rising", they used the name Once Dead. They released a DVD of that show called Return with a Vengeance.

On August 6, 2017, it was announced that Human Sacrifice was being reissued and a reunion show, with the band's original lineup, with Jim Settle, vocalist of Hand of Fire, filling-in on vocals for Martinez, would be performed at SoCal Metal Fest 2 on August 12.

== Discography ==
Studio albums

- Human Sacrifice (1988, Intense Records, Reviews: Cross Rhythms, PowerMetal.de (in German))
- Once Dead (1990, Intense, Reviews: Cross Rhythms (1), Cross Rhythms (2))
- Destruction Comes (1991, Intense, Review: Cross Rhythms)
- Released Upon the Earth (1992, Intense)

Compilations

- Anthology (1993, Intense)

== Members ==
Many members have participated in other projects

Current

Name	Instrument	Years	Other groups	Additional notes	Ref
Larry Farkas	Lead Guitars	1987–1990, 2017–present	Die Happy, Neon Cross, Deliverance, Holy Soldier, Once Dead, Sanctuary Celebration Band, D.O.G., S.A.L.T.		
Doug Thieme	Rhythm Guitars	1987–1990, 2017–present	Die Happy, Once Dead		
Roger Dale Martin	Bass	1987–1990, 2017–present	Emerald, Holy Right, Die Happy, Once Dead, Sanctuary Celebration Band		
Glen Mancaruso	Drums	1987–1990, 2017–present	Die Happy, Once Dead, S.A.L.T.		
Jim Settle	Vocals	2017–present	Tantrum of the Muse, Bore, Hand of Fire		

Former

Name	Instrument	Years	Other groups	Additional notes
Roger Martinez	rhythm guitar, bass, lead vocals	1987–1992 (died in 2025)	Prophet	
Chris Hyde	drums	1991	Deliverance, Holy Soldier	deceased 2015
Derek Sean	lead guitar	1991	Mortification	
Johnny Vasquez	drums	1991–1992	Mortification (live), the Blamed	
Glenn Rogers	rhythm guitars	1987	Hirax, Deliverance, Heretic, Once Dead, Final Decree, Primal, Steel Vengeance, Viking	
Sharon	vocals	1987		
Steve Bertram	drums	1987	Final Decree	
Michael Betts	drums	1987	Neon Cross	

Session musicians

- Jamie Mitchell - (1991) lead guitar (Scaterd Few)
- Victor Macias (aka Joe Monsorb'nik) - (1991) bass (Tourniquet, Deliverance)
- Jimmy P. Brown II (aka Simon Dawg) - (1991) (Deliverance)

Touring musicians

- George Ochoa - (1992) guitars (Deliverance, Recon, Worldview)
- Daniel Cordova - (1992) guitars (the Slave Eye, Shades of Crimson, the Sacrificed, Heretic)
- Michael Wagel - (1992) bass

== Side projects ==
- Larry Farkas, Doug Thieme, Roger Martin, and Glenn Mancaruso played in Die Happy. All the aforementioned also formed Once Dead with Scott Waters in 2004.
- Jamie Mitchell played in the punk band Scaterd Few.
- Larry Farkas, George Ochoa, Jimmy Brown, Chris Hyde and Victor Macias played in Deliverance.
- Daniel Cordova made a guest appearance on "Sons of Thunder" CD by Driver.
- Roger Martinez produced a demo for the band Ritual in 1991.
- Macias also performed in Tourniquet.
