= Destruction Comes =

Studio album by Vengeance Rising
- Released: 1991
- Genre: Thrash metal, Christian metal
- Label: Intense/Frontline
- Producer: Roger Martinez

Vengeance Rising chronology
Once Dead (1990)	Destruction Comes (1991)	Released Upon the Earth (1992)

Destruction Comes is the third album by Vengeance Rising released in 1991. The album was the first album to not feature any members of the original members other than Vocalist Roger Martinez, who recorded Bass and Rhythm Guitar. The other members that were on the album were Derek Sean, who recorded Guitars on Mortification's self titled album, and Chris Hyde, former drummer of Deliverance and Holy Soldier. The album was re-released on Intense Millennium Records in 2011.

== Critical reception ==
Professional ratings
Review scores
Source	Rating
Cross Rhythms	8–10

The album was reviewed by Harvest Rock Syndicate, Heaven's Metal and YouthWorker in the years 1991-1992. The website "Classic Thrash" wrote "After some radical line-up changes Vengeance Rising were back with only Roger Martinez left of the original group, which probably had a serious impact on the new album. Destruction Comes demonstrates a much more streamlined sound with very little of the previous variety left. It is unarguably quite a lot more one-dimensional in comparison to the old, even considering that the new band were able to maintain a constant speed in a respectable way. Everything pretty much follows the same formula, complete with nearly identical tempo and vocals on almost every track. After the first couple of songs have passed you effectively fail to notice any real difference between the rest, and by the end of the album you've probably given up paying any attention a long time ago. Maybe Destruction Comes is not a total loss after all, but it can be surprisingly tiresome to listen to it even halfway through." Cross Rhythms writer Tony Cummings gave the album a two out of ten, stating "Vengeance Rising (originally Vengeance) were quite the white metal team everyone was talking about, but after a sparkling debut album was followed by a pretty dire one, they now complete the decline with an album which has all the noise and aggression but none of the subtlety."

== Track listing ==
No.	Title	Length
1.	"You Can't Stop It"	5:13
2.	"The Rising"	5:14
3.	"Before the Time"	3:00
4.	"The Sword"	3:09
5.	"He Don't Own Nothing"	3:09
6.	"Countless Corpses"	5:32
7.	"Thanatos"	5:06
8.	"You Will Bow"	4:08
9.	"Hyde Under Pressure"	1:09
10.	"Raegoul"	6:51

== Personnel ==
Vengeance

- Roger Martinez - vocals, bass, rhythm guitar, producer, mixing
- Derek Sean - lead guitar
- Chris Hyde - drums

Production

- Eddie Schryer - mastering
- Gil Morales - engineer, mixing
- Craig Brock - assistant engineer
- Brandon Harris - assistant engineer
