= Released Upon the Earth =

Studio album by Vengeance Rising
- Released: 1992
- Recorded: 1992
- Genre: Thrash metal, Christian metal, Death metal
- Length: 39:51
- Label: Intense/Frontline
- Producer: Roger Martinez

Vengeance Rising chronology
Destruction Comes (1991)	Released Upon the Earth (1992)

Released Upon the Earth is the fourth album of the thrash metal band, Vengeance Rising. The album was later re-released in 2015, remastered and expanded. The only official members of the band at this point were founder Roger Martinez and new drummer Johnny Vasquez, who would later play with Mortification, when they first came to America, Tooth n’ Nail recording artists The Blamed (21 album tour), and Time Spent Burning Alongside Vasquez, on this album, Steve Rowe performed guest vocals on the track "Tion".

== Critical reception ==
Professional ratings
Review scores
Source	Rating
Cross Rhythms	4/10

Dave Williams wrote "...musically, they are really not in the same league as our own home grown Seventh Angel and Detritus. I think in this case the Americans need to take a lesson from the inventors of metal music - the British." Classic Thrash reports "In all honesty, Released Upon The Earth may be far from perfection, but for some reason it is the Vengeance Rising release that has got the most spins from me so far." The magazine, Heaven's Metal also did a review of the album, written by Doug Van Pelt.

== Track listing ==
No.	Title	Length
1.	"Help Me"	6:17
2.	"The Damnation of Judas and the Salvation of a Thief"	3:14
3.	"Released Upon the Earth"	2:02
4.	"Human Dark Potential"	4:18
5.	"Instruments of Death"	3:46
6.	"Lest You Be Judged"	3:47
7.	"Out of Bounds"	3:27
8.	"Bishop of Souls"	5:24
9.	"Tion"	2:59
10.	"You Will Be Hated"	4:37

== Personnel ==
Vengeance Rising

- Roger Martinez - vocals, guitar
- Johnny Vasquez - drums
- Victor Macias (Tourniquet)- bass
- Jamie Mitchell (Scaterd Few)- guitar
- Jimmy Brown (Deliverance) - rhythm guitar
- (Touring Band):
- Daniel Cordova - rhythm guitar
- Mike Wagel - bass
- George Ochoa (Deliverance/Recon)- guitar
- Johnny Vasquez drums
- Roger Martinez - vocals

Additional musicians

- Gordon Martinez - backing vocals
- David Fuentes - backing vocals
- David Vasquez - backing vocals
- Michael Kramer - backing vocals
- David Portillo - backing vocals
- Simon Dawg - guitars
- Steve Rowe - additional vocals on "Tion"
- Jamie Mitchell - lead guitars
- Joe Monsorb'nik - bass guitar

Production

- Ed McTaggart - art direction
- Joe Potter - design
- George Ochoa - engineering, mixing
- John Matousek - mastering
- Thom Roy - second engineer
- Roger Mike - second engineer
- Pat Woehl - engineering
- Gil Morales - drum tracking engineer
- Andre Pavalotos - drum tech
