= 1914 (band) =

Ukrainian extreme metal band

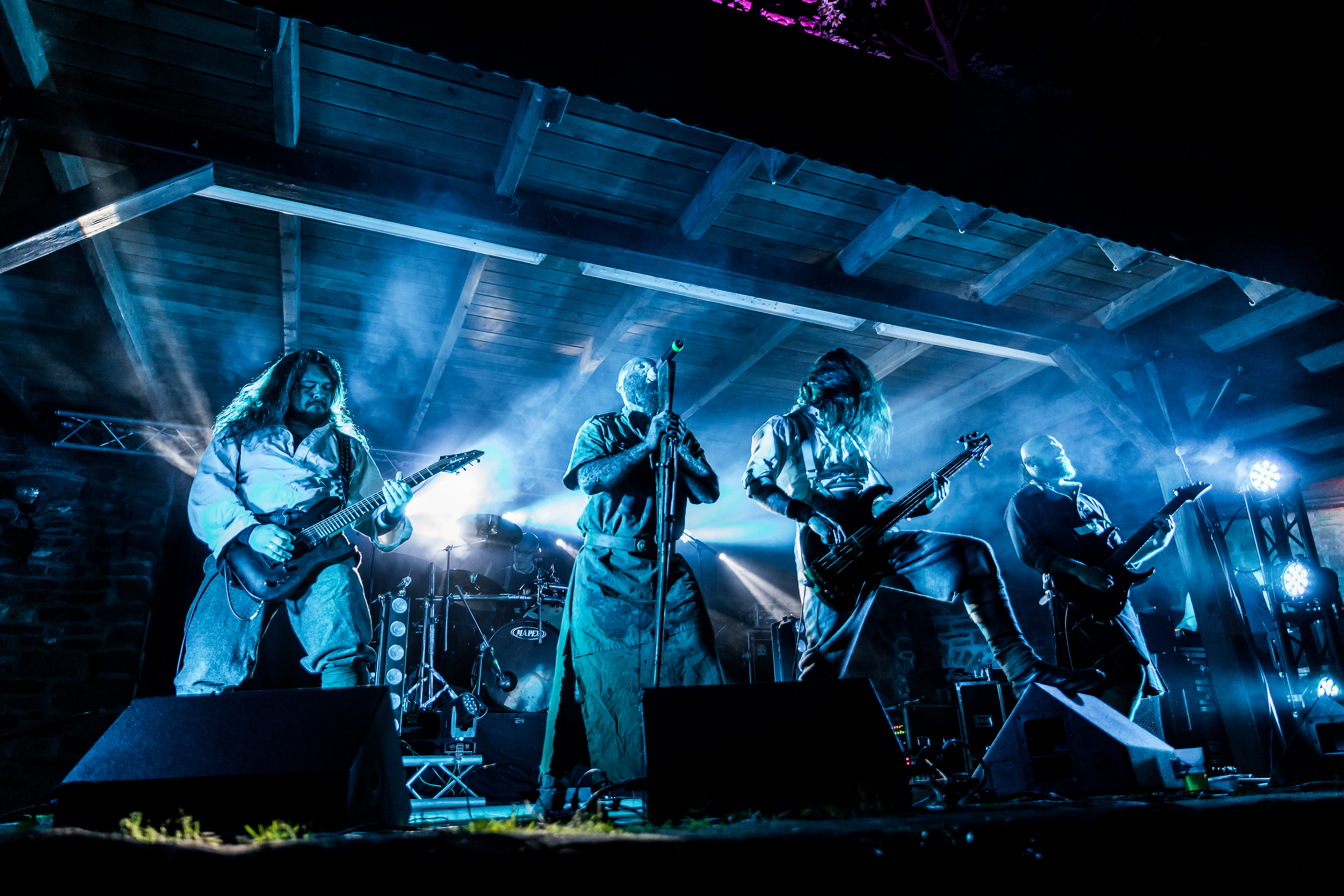
- 1914 at Dark Troll Open Air 2019

Background information
- Origin: Lviv, Ukraine
- Genres: Blackened death metal; death-doom
- Years active: 2014–present
- Labels: Archaic Sound; Napalm Records
- Members: Dietmar Kumarberg; Liam Fessen; Vitalis Winkelhock; Armin von Heinessen; Igor Kovalenko
- Past members: Serge Russell; Andrew Naifman; Basil Lagenndorf; Rusty Potoplakht

1914 is a Ukrainian metal band formed in Lviv in 2014. The band is themed primarily around World War I, and the group itself was named for the year it began. Musically, 1914 combines the sound of doom, death and black metal.

== History ==
1914 was founded in summer 2014 in Lviv by Dmytro "Kumar" Ternuschak along with other musicians who already had musical experience and played in various Ukrainian musical groups, Skinhate, Ambivalence, ForceOut, Johny B Gut, Stalag 328, Disentrail, Ratbite, Toster).

In 2015, the band released their debut album Eschatology of War through Archaic Sound. Three years later, their second album, The Blind Leading the Blind, was released. The album received positive reviews from the music press and 1914 soon signed a contract with Napalm Records.

The label released their third studio album, Where Fear and Weapons Meet, in 2021, which also received critical acclaim and was later included in several lists of the best albums of the year.

On 21 August 2025, 1914 announced the name of their fourth studio album Viribus Unitis and its lead single "1916 (The Südtirol Offensive)", which was released the following day. On 3 October 2025, the band released the second single "1914 (The Siege of Przemyśl)".

== Musical style ==
1914 plays a mixture of death and doom metal. Black metal influences can also be heard occasionally. The deep-tuned, booming guitars and the deep bass are striking. In addition, the band also builds many melodic, often depressing guitar parts into the songs. The typical blast beats from death metal are rather rare, instead the band plays songs in medium or sluggish tempo. Many songs are accompanied by samples, such as speeches from the First World War, sounds of battle, or engine noise. The intros ("War In") and outros ("War Out") on the albums are typical, each representing songs from that time in authentic sound quality.

== Members ==
=== Current ===
- 2nd Division, 147th Infantry Regiment, Senior Lieutenant Dietmar Kumarberg (Dmytro Ternushchak) – vocals (2014–present)
- 37th Division, Field Artillery Regiment No. 73, watchman Liam Fessen (Oleksa Fisyuk) – guitar (2014–present)
- 5th Division, Ulanensky Regiment No. 3, Sergeant Vitalis Winkelhock (Vitaliy Vyhovskyi) – guitar (2016–present)
- 9th Division, Grenadier Regiment No. 7, non-commissioned officer Armin von Heinessen (Armen Oganesyan) – bass (2014–present)
- Reich (Igor Kovalenko) – drums (2024–present)

=== Former ===
- First lieutenant Serge Russell (company C, 306th machine gun battalion) (Serhiy) – drums (2014–2016)
- Sergeant Andrew Naifman (157th Field Artillery Regiment, 40th Infantry Division) (Andriy Rieznikov) – guitar (2014–2015)
- 5th Division, Ulanen Regiment No. 3, Sergeant Basil Lagenndorf (Vasyl Lahodiuk) – guitar (2015–2016)
- 33rd Division, 7th Thuringian Infantry Regiment. No. 96, Private Rusty Potoplakht (Rostyslav Potoplyak) – drums (2016–2024)

== Gallery ==
Band members at Metal Frenzy open air 2026

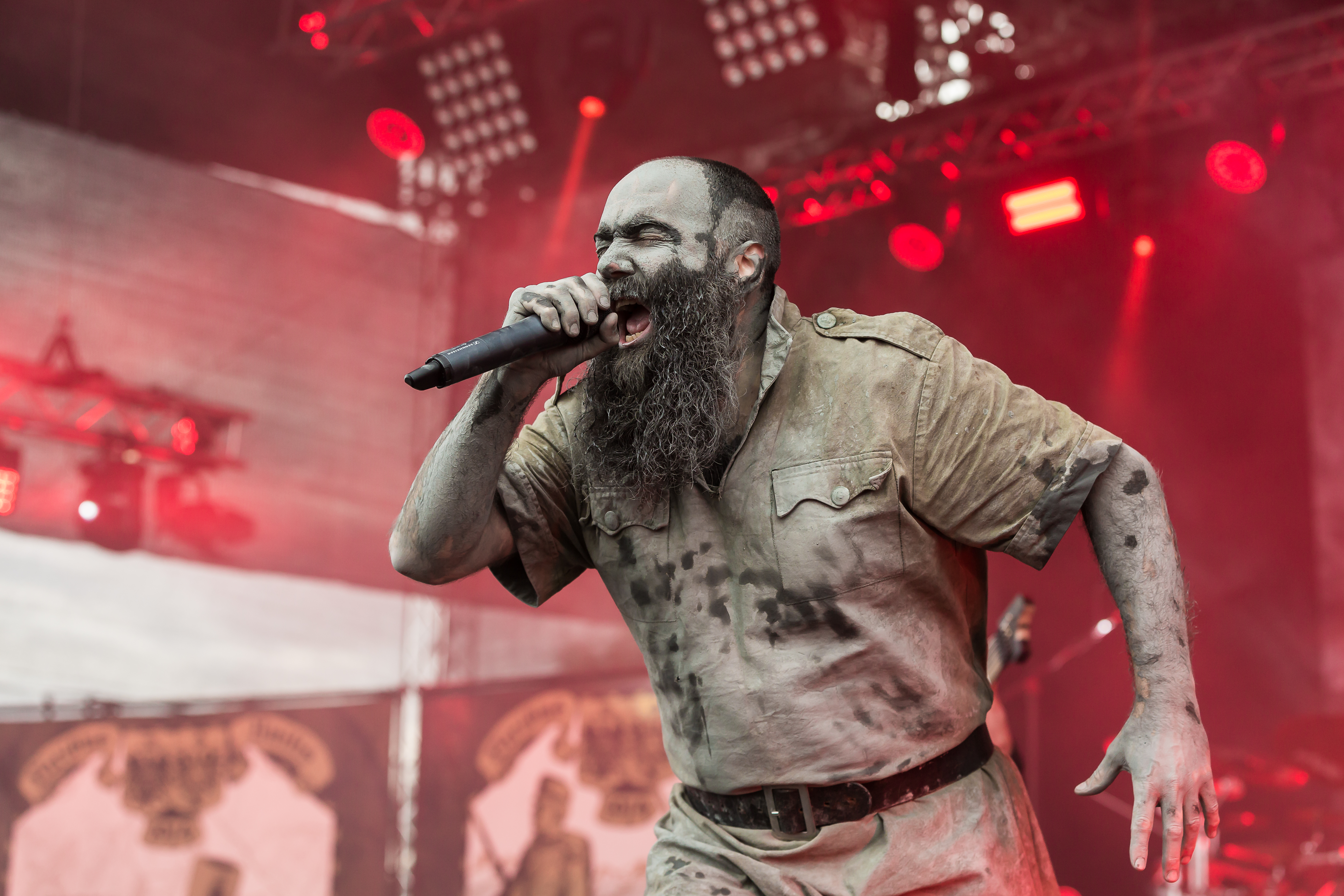
Dmytro Ternushchak ("Ditmar Kumarberg"), vocals

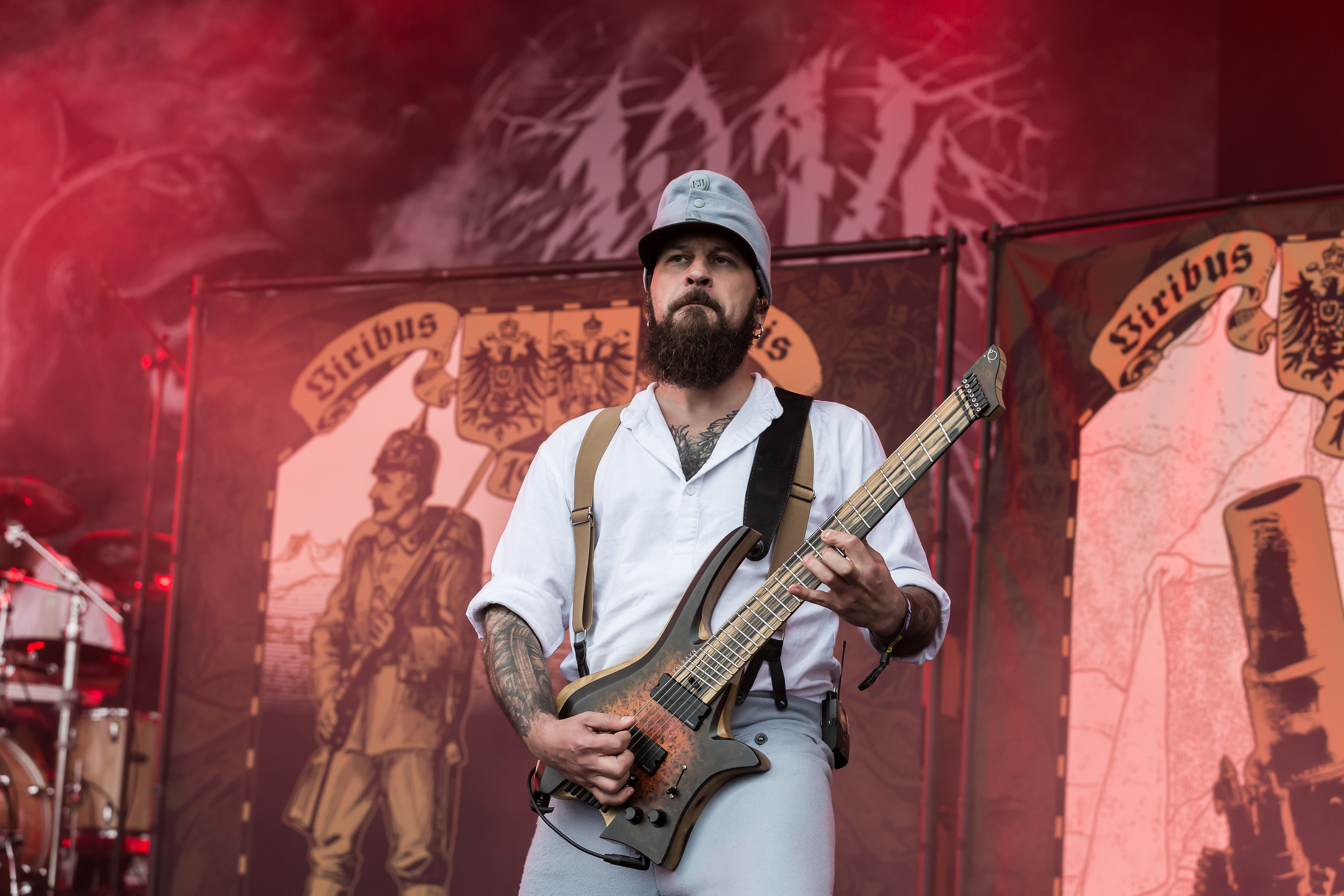
Oleksa Fisyuk ("Liam Fessen"), guitars

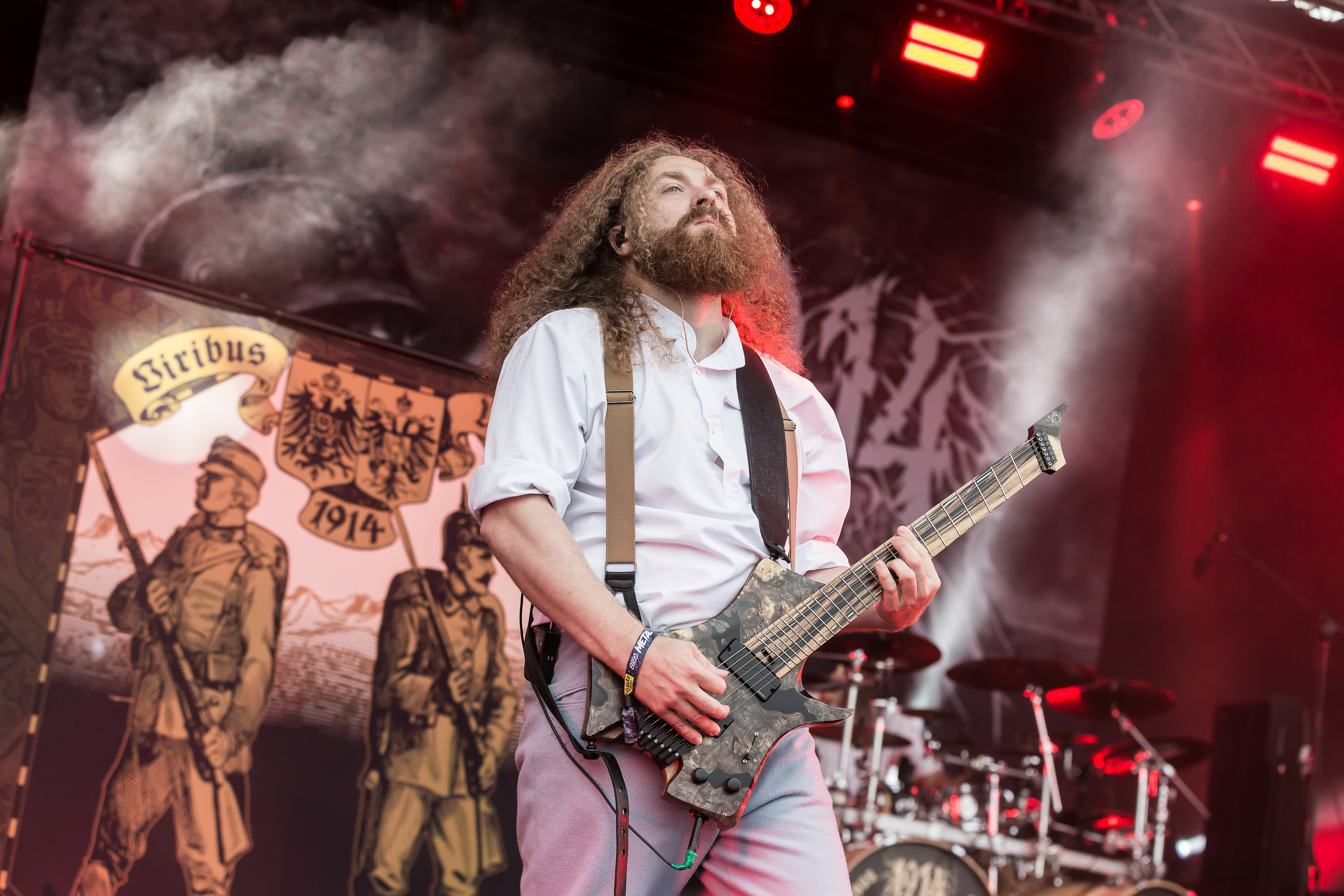
Vitaliy Vygovskyy ("Vitalis Winkelhock"), guitars

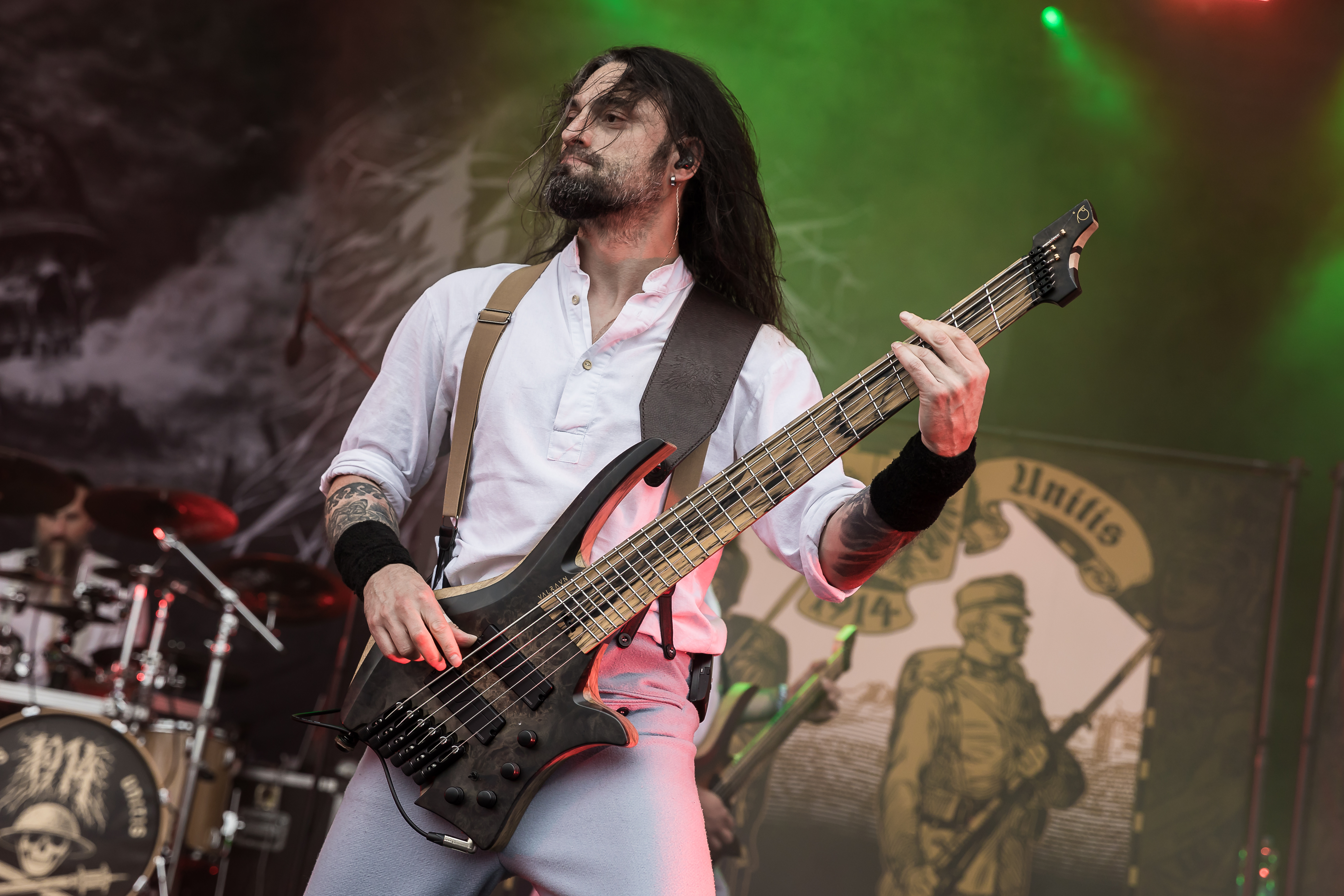
Armen "Deazer" Ohanesian ("Armin von Heinessen"), bass

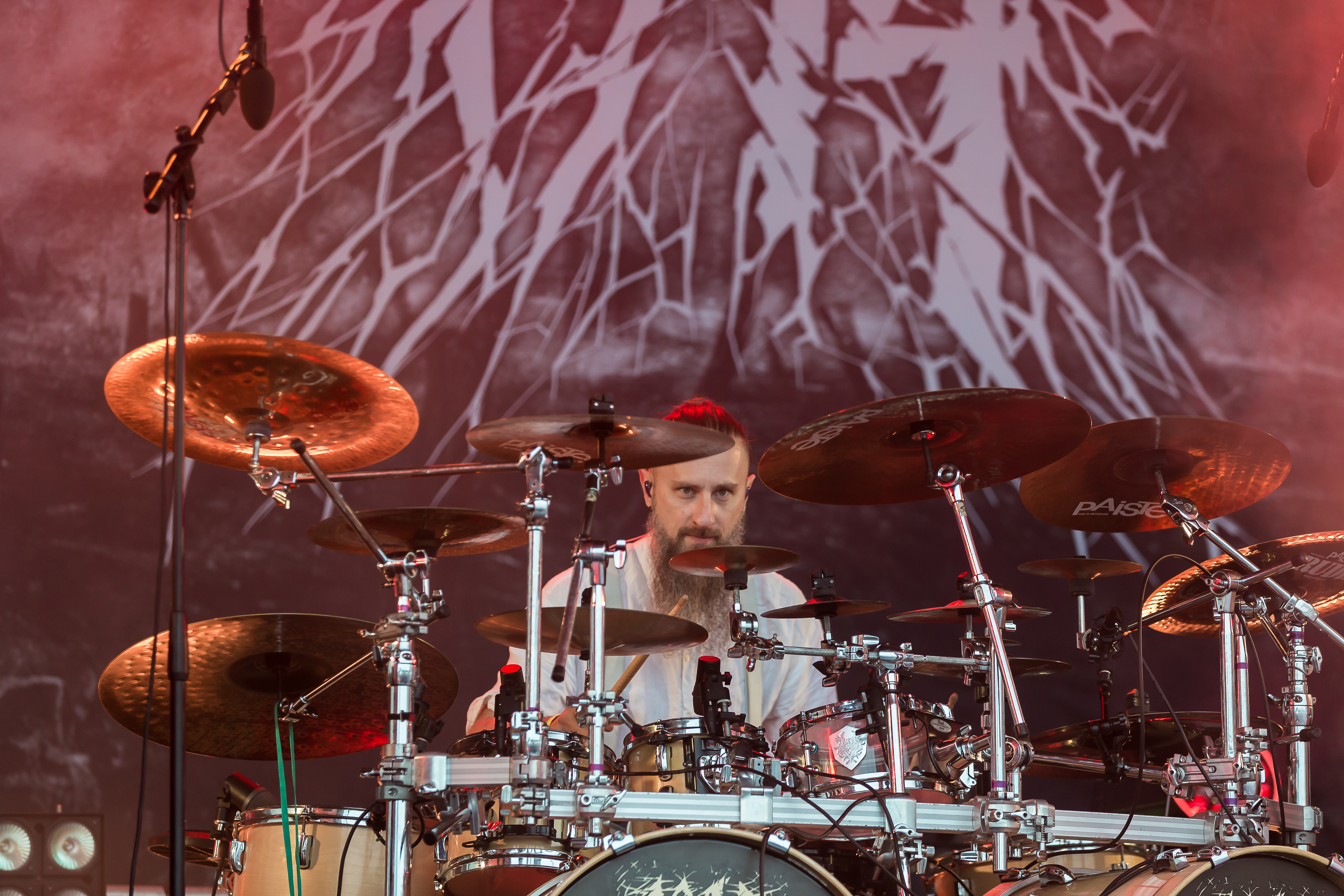
Igor Kovalenko ("Reich"), drums

== Discography ==
Studio albums

- Eschatology of War (2015)
- The Blind Leading the Blind (2018)
- Where Fear and Weapons Meet (2021)
- Viribus Unitis (2025)

Other albums

- Ich hatt einen Kameraden (2016, split with Minenwerfer)
- Eschatology of War / Für Kaiser, Volk und Vaterland (2016, compilation)
- Für Kaiser, Volk und Vaterland! (2016, EP)

Singles

- "Caught in the Crossfire" (2014)
- "Frozen in Trenches (Christmas Truce)" (2014)
- "Zeppelin Raids" (2015)
- "Stoßtrupp 1917" (2017)
- "...and a Cross Now Marks His Place" (2021)
- "Pillars of Fire (The Battle of Messines)" (2021)
- "FN .380 ACP#19074" (2021)
- "Flammenwerfer vor!" (2022)
- "Invaders Must Die" (2025)
- "1916 (The Südtirol Offensive)" (2025)
- "1914 (The Siege of Przemysl)" (2025)
