= If You Must =

If You Must may refer to:

- If You Must (Nirvana song)
- If You Must (Del the Funky Homosapien song)
- If You Must (album), a 1994 album by Precious Death
