= Viribus Unitis (1914 album) =

Studio album by 1914
- Released: 14 November 2025
- Studio: Jenny Records (Lviv)
- Genre: Blackened death metal; death-doom
- Length: 56:58
- Label: Napalm
- Producer: Alexander Backlund

1914 chronology
Where Fear and Weapons Meet (2021)	Viribus Unitis (2025)

Singles from Viribus Unitis
- 1. "1916 (The Südtirol Offensive)" Released: 22 August 2025; 2. "1914 (The Siege of Przemyśl)" Released: 3 October 2025; 3. "1918 Pt. 3: ADE (A Duty to Escape)" Released: 13 November 2025

Viribus Unitis is the fourth studio album by the Ukrainian metal band 1914. It was released on 14 November 2025 via Napalm Records. It is the last album to include drummer Rostislaw Potoplacht (Rostyslav Potoplyak), who left the band before its release.

== Background and promotion ==
On 21 August 2025, 1914 announced the name of their fourth studio album Viribus Unitis and its lead single "1916 (The Südtirol Offensive)", which was released the following day. On 3 October 2025, the band released the second single "1914 (The Siege of Przemyśl)". On 13 November 2025, they released the third single "1918 Pt. 3: ADE (A Duty to Escape)", one day before the album's release.

== Lyrics ==
The album's title, Viribus Unitis, refers to the personal motto of the Austro-Hungarian Emperor Franz Joseph I. The album's songs tell the story of a Ukrainian soldier, Lviv native, who survived World War I, was held in Italian captivity, and returned home during the Polish-Ukrainian War.

== Critical reception ==
Professional ratings
Review scores
Source	Rating
Blabbermouth.net	(8/10)
Distorted Sound	(9/10)

The album was met with positive reviews. Blabbermouth.net rated it with a score of 8 out of 10. Phil Cooper of Distorted Sound scored the album 9 out of 10 and called the album for "far more engaging than just a topical backdrop."

== Track listing ==
All lyrics are written by Dmytro Ternuschak, except the instrumental tracks "War In (The Beginning of the Fall)" and "War Out (The End?)"; all music is composed by 1914, except where noted.

Viribus Unitis track listing
No.	Title	Music	Length
1.	"War In (The Beginning of the Fall)"		1:30
2.	"1914 (The Siege of Przemyśl)"		4:48
3.	"1915 (Easter Battle for the Zwinin Ridge)"		9:14
4.	"1916 (The Südtirol Offensive)"		6:11
5.	"1917 (The Isonzo Front)"		6:34
6.	"1918 Pt 1: WIA (Wounded in Action)"		6:20
7.	"1918 Pt 2: POW (Prisoner of War)" (featuring Christopher Scott)		6:13
8.	"1918 Pt 3: ADE (A Duty to Escape)" (featuring Aaron Stainthorpe)		5:50
9.	"1919 (The Home Where I Died)" (featuring Jérôme Reuter)	Dmytro Ternuschak; Andrii Fransen	7:07
10.	"War Out (The End?)"	Bourdon; Rosario; Denys Sichynsky; Michael Zazulak	3:11
Total length:			56:58

== Personnel ==
Credits adapted from Bandcamp.

=== 1914 ===
- Rostislaw Potoplacht (Note: Potoplacht left the group in 2024, but he is included with the other members as a "performing artist" for his contributions to the album.) – drums
- Ditmar Kumarberg – vocals
- Witaly Wyhovsky – guitar
- Oleksa Fisiuk – guitar
- Armen Howhannisjan – bass

=== Additional contributors ===
- Christopher Scott – vocals on "1918 Pt 2: POW (Prisoner of War)"
- Aaron Stainthorpe – vocals on "1918 Pt 3: ADE (A Duty to Escape)"
- Jérôme Reuter – vocals on "1919 (The Home Where I Died)"
- Alexander Backlund – production, mixing
- Tony Lindgren – mastering
- Sofia Ruda – photos
- Vladimir "Smerdulak" Chebakov – cover artwork

== Charts ==
Chart performance for Viribus Unitis
Chart (2025)	Peak position
Austrian Albums (Ö3 Austria)	19
French Rock & Metal Albums (SNEP)	98
German Albums (Offizielle Top 100)	41
German Rock & Metal Albums (Offizielle Top 100)	10
