= Where Fear and Weapons Meet =

Where Fear and Weapons Meet may refer to:

- Where Fear and Weapons Meet (band), a hardcore punk band from South Florida
- Where Fear and Weapons Meet (album), a 2021 album by the Ukrainian metal band 1914
