= Jim Chaffin =

American drummer

- Origin: Madera, California, U.S.
- Genres: Christian metal; Christian hardcore; crossover thrash; thrash metal; thrashcore; metallic hardcore; hardcore punk
- Occupation: Drummer
- Years active: 1984–present
- Website: jimchaffin.net/Chaffin/About.html

Jim Chaffin is an American musician. He is the original drummer for the Crucified and Fasedown and has played with many other acts, such as Deliverance, the Blamed and Left Out.

== History ==
Jim Chaffin was born in Madera, California and began playing drums at the age of 12 and shows at the age of 15. Chaffin started his musical career in the Christian hardcore band, the Crucified. Chaffin founded the band along Guitarist Greg Minier, Bassist Kirk Palmer, and Vocalist Wayne Stonecipher in Fresno, California. The band formed in 1984 as K.G.B. Before the band changed their name to the Crucified, Lead Vocalist Wayne Stonecipher left the band and was replaced by Mark Salomon.

The name, the Crucified, came from Chaffin thinking of random names that would fit a Christian band. The Crucified added "For I have been crucified with Christ, therefore I no longer live, but Christ lives in me." to their name whenever they wrote it. Soon after, in 1986, bassist Kirk Palmer quit the band and was replaced by his brother Trevor. Trevor Palmer quit the band in 1988 and was replaced by Mark Johnson. The band recorded their debut self-titled album in 1988 and was released in 1989, before Johnson was fired from the band. Jeff Bellew was then recruited. Chaffin joined the Christian Thrash Metal band Deliverance in 1990 when original drummer Chris Hyde left the band, filling in until former Recon drummer John Christianson joined the band. The Crucified recorded their second album, The Pillars of Humanity in 1991. The band disbanded in 1993, and played a reunion/final show on the Cornerstone Festival 1995 bill.

Before the Crucified's reunion show, Bryan Gray hired Chaffin to perform drums with the Blamed, a punk band out of California. The two had met during their respective tenure as touring musicians for Mortal and recording on their entry in the Intense Live Series. With Chaffin, they recorded 21, Frail, and two other albums before he departed in 1999. Chaffin took this time to focus on his other projects, including Fasedown and Left Out. Chaffin played drums on Left Out's Pride Kills album, another project of Gray's.

Fasedown re-formed in 1998 when Chaffin and lead guitarist Mike Phillips, got together with some ideas to bring a heavy style of music to the scene with a Christ-centered message. In 1999 frontman Devin Shaeffer was asked to officially join the band. After a short break, the band self-released their second album Blitz of Anguish. In 2006, after their release of the DVD, Return with a Vengeance, Chaffin joined the band Once Dead on drums.

In 2007, the band decided to call it quits while Jim and Devin going to Once Dead, writing the album Visions of Hell. In 2007, Once Dead started recording their album Visions of Hell with Chaffin on drums. The album didn't get released until 2008, due to the band's lead guitarist, Larry Farkas, leaving in the final process of recording. In 2009, Fasedown reconvened to discuss the idea of a reunion. They have been inactive since 2011.

In 2009, the Crucified reunited and released a compilation on Tooth & Nail Records. Chaffin was only in Deliverance for a brief time, but later rejoined in 2014 as a part of a new lineup. The lineup included founder, vocalist and guitarist Jimmy P. Brown II, guitarist George Ochoa, and bassist Victor Máciás. The band began writing and recording their new album, The Subversive Kind, which Chaffin, Brown and Macias wrote primarily. Ochoa departed from the band, being replaced by Glenn Rogers. However, Minier, Chaffin's former bandmate, recorded some of the solos on the album.

As of 2014 he was playing with the Satire, but would depart in 2018, as he claimed it was not a natural fit.

In 2016, the Blamed reunited after breaking up in 2002, with Chaffin returning, alongside Gray, Sid Doffour, Jeff Locke, and Wiley Willis. With the lineup, they performed at Audiofeed Festival and began to write a new album. However, Willis would depart from the band, with Gray returning to vocals as the primary vocalist. In 2018, the band released a split with the Satire. In 2019, they released an album, The Church Is Hurting People, which would be Chaffin's fifth album with the band.

== Personal life ==
Chaffin is married to Stacy Chaffin and has three children and one grandchild. He currently resides in Fresno, California.

== Bands ==
Current

- Deliverance – drums (1990-1991, 2014–present)
- The Blamed – drums (1994–1999, 2016–present)
- Sarge Loda – drums (2016–present)

Former

- Left Out – drums (1997–1998)
- Fasedown – drums (1998–2007, 2009–2011)
- Final Threat – drums (2011–2013)
- Once Dead – drums (2005–2019)
- Three Kings – drums (2011)
- The Satire – drums (2014–2018)

Hiatus

- The Crucified – drums (1984–1993, 2009–present)

Session or touring

- Mortal – drums (1993–1994)
- Living Sacrifice – drums (2011)
- Wretched Graverobber – drums (2013)
- Lifesavers Underground – drums (2008–2010)
- Michael Phillips – drums (2009)

== Discography ==
The Crucified

- KGB (1985, as KGB)
- Take up Your Cross (1986)
- Nailed (1987)
- The Crucified (1989)
- Live at the New Order (1989)
- The Pillars of Humanity (1991)
- Nailed/Take up Your Cross (1993)
- The Complete Collection (2009)

Mortal

- Intense Live Series Vol. 5 (1993)

Left Out

- Pride Kills (1996)

The Blamed

- 21 (1994)
- Frail (1995)
- ...again (1998)
- Forever (1999)
- Split (EP w/ The Satire) (2018)
- The Church Is Hurting People (2019)

Fasedown

- Demo (1999)
- Fasedown (2000)
- Blitz of Anguish (2005)

Once Dead

- Visions of Hell (2008)

Lifesavers Underground

- PTSD (2009)

Wretched Graverobber

- Christmas Spirit (2013)

Deliverance

- The Subversive Kind (2018)
