= The Subversive Kind =

Studio album by Deliverance
- Released: February 23, 2018
- Recorded: 2017
- Studio: 3Frogz Studios, Alabama
- Genre: Thrash metal, speed metal, Christian metal
- Length: 31:20
- Label: Roxx, 3Frogz
- Producer: Jimmy P. Brown II, Jim Chaffin

Deliverance chronology
Hear What I Say! (2013)	The Subversive Kind (2018)

Professional ratings
Review scores
Source	Rating
PowerMetal.de	8.5/10 stars
Angelic Warlord	85%
The Metal Resource	8/10 stars
Battlehelm	3/5 stars
The Metal Mag	100/100
Metal Eyes Zine	7.5/10 stars

The Subversive Kind is the eleventh studio album by the metal band, Deliverance, released in 2018. It was originally not supposed to exist, as the band announced in 2013 that Hear What I Say! would be the final album.

Jimmy P. Brown was contacted by George Ochoa, who stated Deliverance should reunite. Brown and Ochoa added Victor Macias (Tourniquet) and Jim Chaffin, and performed at Exodo Fest in 2016, alongside Abated Mass of Flesh and Silent Planet.

The festival was a big part of why Deliverance reunited, as it enjoyed performing together. It then hired Greg Minier from the Crucified and former guitarist Glenn Rogers to play lead on the album.

== Track listing ==
No.	Title	Length
1.	"Bring 'Em Down"	3:39
2.	"Concept of the Other"	3:54
3.	"Center of It All"	3:42
4.	"The Black Hand"	3:52
5.	"Epilogue"	4:01
6.	"Listen Closely"	3:28
7.	"The Subversive Kind"	4:14
8.	"The Fold"	4:30

== Personnel ==
Deliverance

- Jimmy P. Brown – vocals, rhythm guitars, engineer, mixing, producer
- Glenn Rogers – lead guitars
- Victor Macias – bass guitar
- Jim Chaffin – drums, producer

Additional musicians

- Greg Minier – lead guitars

Production

- Rob Colwell – mastering
- Scott Waters – layout and design
- Robert Scott – cover art
