= Human Sacrifice (album) =

Studio album by Vengeance Rising
- Released: 1988
- Recorded: 1988 California
- Genre: Christian metal, thrash metal, death metal
- Length: 36:29
- Label: Intense

Vengeance Rising chronology
Vengeance (1987)	Human Sacrifice (1988)	Once Dead (1990)

Professional ratings
Review scores
Source	Rating
Campus Life	(unrated)
CCM Magazine	(unrated)
Cross Rhythms	7/10 stars
Powermetal.de	positive

Human Sacrifice is the first studio album by the Christian death and thrash metal band Vengeance Rising. It is the first full-length Christian thrash metal album as it was released in 1988. Though controversial, Human Sacrifice and the following album, Once Dead were huge successes in the world of Christian music, making Vengeance Rising one of the few bands in the genre to cross over into the secular music scene. Dave Caughney of Cross Rhythms magazine wrote in 1990 that this "legendary classic debut [...] breathed much needed freshness into the somewhat stale white metal (Christian metal) scene". HM Magazine editor Doug Van Pelt called Human Sacrifice "the most radical Christian album ever released". In 2010, HM ranked Human Sacrifice the best Christian metal album of all time on its Top 100 list because it "tilted the Christian metal world on its ear".

The lyrics of Human Sacrifice retell several major points of Christ's ministry: His incarnation, crucifixion, resurrection, and Second Coming. The band compares the form to that of an opera, with a dramatic beginning, middle, and ending.

== Recording history ==
Human Sacrifice was recorded in 1988, and released on Intense Records the same year with 1,000 copies. Soon a Dutch band called Vengeance demanded the group to change its name. After renaming itself as "Vengeance Rising", the band re-released Human Sacrifice with the word "rising" under the logo on cover picture. Causing further issues for the band, some Christians, noting the unusual vocal and musical style, labeled the release as demonic. These issues, along with the cover image which featured the pierced hand of Bob Beeman (founder of Sanctuary International) caused the album to be pulled from the shelves of some Christian bookstores.

Musically, Human Sacrifice focuses on brutal thrash metal in vein of Dark Angel, old Death and Slayer. Roger Martinez's vocals are more of the death metal type growling approach than typical thrash shouting. One Christian youth magazine stated that the style made "Stryper sound like Sandi Patti." Vengeance Rising was influenced by 1970s hard rock and heavy metal groups. This shows in the blues rock influences on several tracks. There are three short songs on Human Sacrifice: "Receive Him" (6 s.), "Salvation" (17 s.) and "He is God" (53 s.) Lyrically, Human Sacrifice was noticed for having violent themes on songs like "Burn", and fire and brimstone themes that "would make even the most conservative theologian proud" on "Fill This Place With Blood".

Human Sacrifice is said to be one of the more extreme Christian metal albums that was available in the 1980s, and it has become somewhat a legend in the Christian circles. In the Summer 2006 issue of Revolver magazine's The Revolver Record Collection section, guest writer Doug Van Pelt provided a list of ten recommended Christian metal albums in which Human Sacrifice was mentioned, stating that "In daring to be sonically scary, Human Sacrifice bumped up the credibility of Christian metal several notches." In 2010, HM magazine ranked Human Sacrifice No. 10 on its Top 100 Christian Rock Albums of All Time list stating that "nothing has really come out before or since this album hit the scene. Awesome riffs played at breakneck speed, but just gnarly, groove-heavy riffs on their own. Tunes like "White Throne" and the title track are without question high-water marks of the Christian metal scene. Has only one blemish (probably the worst audio engineering glitch of all time) – a bad vocal edit, which comes in at 2:02 during the song "Burn". In August 2010 issue of Heaven's Metal fanzine, the album ranked No. 1 on the Top 100 Christian metal albums of all-time list because it "is just amazing. It tilted the Christian metal world on its ear. Imagine Slayer with Jesus-first lyrics. The band was so tight and rooted in blues, but played at 100 mph. The vocalist is now an avowed 'Satanic atheist,' so there is a lot of drama post the breakup of the band. The song 'White Throne' will just knock you off your seat. Great building song with dramatic payoff in each chorus."

Intense Millennium Records reissued both Human Sacrifice and Once Dead albums with new artwork on November 9, 2010.

== Track listing ==
1. "Human Sacrifice" (2:36)
2. "Burn" (3:59)
3. "Mulligan Stew" (3:02)
4. "Receive Him" (0:06)
5. "I Love Hating Evil" (3:26)
6. "Fatal Delay" (3:13)
7. "White Throne" (3:06)
8. "Salvation" (0:17)
9. "From the Dead" (4:34)
10. "Ascension" (5:25)
11. "He is God" (0:53)
12. "Fill this Place with Blood" (2:39)
13. "Beheaded" (3:10)

== Personnel ==
Vengeance

- Roger Martinez – vocals
- Larry Farkas – lead guitar
- Doug Thieme – rhythm guitar
- Roger Dale Martin – bass
- Glenn Mancaruso – drums

Production

- Caesar Kalinowski – producer
- Ron Goudie – mixing
- Dave Hackbarth – engineering
- Robert Feist – engineering
- Jason Brown – engineering
- Atticus Farlow – art direction
- Farlow Lark – art direction
- Ruby Michael – photography
- Christopher Keene – cover art, makeup F/X
- Nar Martinez - cover art photography
- Glenn Rogers – additional writing
