= George Ochoa =

American guitarist that started in 1987 (born 1962)

George Rene Ochoa
- Birth name: Jorge Rene Ochoa
- Born: April 29, 1962 (age 63)
- Origin: Hollywood, California
- Genres: Christian metal; heavy metal; thrash metal; progressive metal
- Occupation: Musician
- Instrument(s): Guitars, keyboards
- Years active: 1987 - present

George Ochoa (born April 29, 1962) is an American guitarist that started being active in 1987.

== History ==
George Ochoa began his musical career with the band Prophet. Ochoa was a part of the band alongside Dion Sanchez and Roger Martinez who would become parts of Recon and Vengeance Rising respectively. Prophet recorded a single demo before changing their name DeRoque. After a brief stint with DeRoque, Ochoa departed.

Ochoa began the power metal band, Recon with Rey Parra (Sacred Warrior). Recon went on for a few years until 1990. Before Recon disbanded, Ochoa joined the thrash metal band, Deliverance. and recorded on the most influential of the Deliverance discography, Weapons of Our Warfare in 1990 and What a Joke in 1991. He left the band in 1991 after the recording of What a Joke.

Ochoa then went on to perform with Vengeance Rising as a live guitarist in 1992. The band only had two official members at that time, vocalist Roger Martinez and drummer Johnny Vasquez. He performed with them until the band disbanded later that year. In 1994, Ochoa seemingly reunited Recon, however, it appeared that nothing came of the reunion. The same year, Ochoa resurfaced with Mortification, the Australian death metal, on their album Primitive Rhythm Machine in 1995 as their guitarist and keyboardist. In 1996, Ochoa left the band.

In 2001, Recon reunited for the second time for a performance at the Cornerstone Festival, with Ochoa returned, being one of three original members. In 2002, Ochoa formed a modern rock band with former Vengeance members, Larry Farkas and Glen Mancaruso, called S.A.L.T.. However, S.A.L.T. disbanded in 2004. Ochoa remained musically silent until 2010. In 2010, Ochoa played with Jimmy P. Brown II's side-project Jupiter VI. In 2013, Ochoa formed a supergroup with Rey Parra, Johnny Gonzales, and Todd Libby.

Ochoa later on re-joined Deliverance several years later in 2014 with Victor Macias and Jim Chaffin. In 2017, it was announced that Ochoa had departed from Deliverance yet a second time, being replaced by Glenn Rogers, who had originally been replaced by Ochoa.

== Discography ==
Deliverance

- Weapons of Our Warfare (1990)
- What a Joke (1991)

Recon

- Recon (1989)
- Behind Enemy Lines (1990)
- Recon '90 (1990)
- Live at Cornerstone 2001 (2001)

Mortification

- Primitive Rhythm Machine (1995)

Worldview

- The Chosen Few (2015)

Vengeance Rising

- Released Upon the Earth (1992)

Guest appearances

- The Bottom Line - Crystavox (1992)
- Back From Mars - Jupiter VI (2006)

Production

- Weapons of our Warfare - Deliverance (1990; Producer)
- Demo - Hozana (1990; Producer)
- Behind Enemy Lines - Recon (1990; Producer, Mixing)
- What a Joke - Deliverance (1992; Producer, Mixing)
- Death to the Flesh - Judgement (1992; Producer)
- Released Upon the Earth - Vengeance Rising (1992; Engineering, Mixing)
- Primitive Rhythm Machine - Mortification (1995; Engineering, Mixing)
- The Chosen Few - Worldview (2015; Engineering, Producer)

== Personal life ==
Ochoa has been married to his wife Denise Malik Ochoa since 2001. They currently reside near Nashville in Mount Juliet, TN.
