= The Blind Leading the Blind (album) =

Studio album by 1914
- Released: 11 November 2018
- Studio: MuzProduction (Lviv, Ukraine)
- Genre: Blackened death metal; death-doom
- Length: 59:16
- Label: Archaic Sound

1914 chronology
| Eschatology of War (2015) | The Blind Leading the Blind (2018) | Where Fear and Weapons Meet (2021) |

Singles from The Blind Leading the Blind
- 1. "Stoßtrupp 1917" Released: 9 October 2017

The Blind Leading the Blind is the second studio album by the Ukrainian metal band 1914, released on 11 November 2018 via Archaic Sound. The release date is dedicated to the 100th anniversary of Armistice Day, the end of World War I. On 31 May 2019, the album was re-released by Napalm Records.

== Critical reception ==
Professional ratings
Review scores
| Source | Rating |
|---|---|
| Blabbermouth.net | 8.5/10 stars |
| Metal Hammer | 6/7 stars |
| Metal.de | 9/10 stars |
| Rock Hard | 7.5/10 stars |

The Blind Leading The Blind received positive reviews from the music press. Critics appreciated the band's approach to understanding the events of World War I. Robert Mueller of Metal Hammer wrote in his review: "The Ukrainians have managed to make an impressively competent death metal statement about a key event of the 20th century with their second album, which understands war not only as an aesthetic fantasy of extinction, but seeks, finds and appreciates human nuances between the barrage of music". Also noted was the successful use of fragments from war films and music of the time, which create a special atmosphere.

The musical component of the album was also praised. Critics noted the harmonious combination of doom, black and death metal, which creates a melancholic and "doomed" mood of the songs, and the combination of fast and slow parts allows the latter to sound more weighty and "crushing". Christian Pop, in his review for Metal.de, described the atmosphere of the album as "dark, depressing and oppressive", also noting the frequently changing tempo of the songs, which prevents the album from sounding monotonous. Dom Lawson, in his review for Blabbermouth.net, spoke highly of the album, concluding: "The Blind Leading The Blind shows that this band has the potential to grow beyond the underground and put Ukraine on the world metal map."

== Track listing ==
| No. | Title | Length |
|---|---|---|
| 1. | "War In" | 1:14 |
| 2. | "Arrival. The Meuse-Argonne" | 6:20 |
| 3. | "A7V Mephisto" | 8:13 |
| 4. | "High Wood. 75 Acres of Hell" | 5:27 |
| 5. | "Beat the Bastards" (The Exploited cover) | 5:02 |
| 6. | "Hanging on the Barbed Wire" | 2:28 |
| 7. | "Passchenhell" | 7:01 |
| 8. | "C'est mon dernier pigeon" | 5:22 |
| 9. | "Stoßtrupp" | 6:13 |
| 10. | "The Hundred Days Offensive" | 10:01 |
| 11. | "War Out" | 1:55 |
| Total length: | | 59:16 |

== Personnel ==
Adapted from AllMusic and The Blind Leading the Blind liner notes:

1914

- 2nd Division, 147th Infantry Regiment, Senior Lieutenant Dietmar Kumarberg (Dmytro Ternushchak) – vocals
- 37th Division, Field Artillery Regiment No. 73, watchman Liam Fessen (Oleksa Fisyuk) – guitar
- 5th Division, Ulanensky Regiment No. 3, Sergeant Vitalis Winkelhock (Vitaliy Vyhovskyi) – guitar
- 9th Division, Grenadier Regiment No. 7, non-commissioned officer Armin von Heinessen (Armen Oganesyan) – bass guitar
- 33rd Division, 7th Thuringian Infantry Regiment. No. 96, Private Rusty Potoplakht (Rostyslav Potoplyak) – drums

Additional musicians

- David Ingram – additional vocals on "Passchenhell"

Production

- Olgerd – engineering
- Alexander Backlund – mixing
- Vladimir "Smerdulak" Chebakov – cover
