= Recon (band) =

American Christian metal band

- Origin: California, U.S.
- Genres: Christian metal; heavy metal; power metal; speed metal; thrash metal
- Years active: 1987–1990, 2001, 2002–2007
- Labels: Millennium Eight, Roxx

Recon was an American Christian metal band that originated in California in 1987.

== Background ==
Recon was a Christian power metal band that originated in Los Angeles in 1987. The band has been compared to fellow Christian power metal bands, such as Stryper, Saint and Sacred Warrior. Many of the past members have been in bands such as Vengeance Rising, Deliverance, Worldview and Shades of Crimson. The band later became Worldview in 2013, stated by former Recon and Sacred Warrior vocalist Rey Perra along with George Ochoa.

Original members included…Robert Rodriguez, singer…. Dion Sanchez, bass… John Gonzalez…. Drums.

Robert Rodriguez (Vette Roberts) and John (Johnny) Gonzalez came from the christian Metal band… Seventh Thunder (1986)

== Discography ==
Studio albums

- Behind Enemy Lines (1990)

Demos

- Recon (1989)
- Recon '90 (1990)

Live

- Live at Cornerstone 2001 (2001)

Split videos

- Live at Cornerstone 2001 (2001)
