= Deliverance (Deliverance album) =

Studio album by Deliverance
- Released: 1989
- Genres: Christian metal, speed metal, thrash metal
- Length: 41:21
- Label: Intense
- Producers: Caesar Kalinowski, Bill Metoyer

Deliverance chronology
Deliverance (1989)	Weapons of Our Warfare (1990)

Deliverance is the 1989 debut album by the Christian speed/thrash metal band Deliverance. The original Intense Records pressing is now considered a valuable collectable. It was reissued, minus 2 songs in 1998 on KMG Records as a two-disc set along with the 1990 album Weapons of Our Warfare. It was officially re-released late 2008 with two bonus tracks on Retroactive Records. The album was ranked at No. 44 on Metal Hammer's top 50 thrash metal albums of all-time list. In 2010, HM Magazine listed Deliverance No. 31 on its Top 100 Christian Rock Albums of All Time list stating that "'If You Will' into 'The Call' is almost as good as metal gets (-Doug Van Pelt)" and that "this record would forever change and impact me and the Christian metal music scene as we knew it!"(-Bill Balford). Heaven's Metal fanzine ranked it No. 3 on its Top 100 Christian metal albums of all-time list. About.com writer Dan Marsicano wrote "Metal with a religious concept is not for everybody, and Deliverance doesn’t try to pander to the secular crowd. So, if you don’t mind a little preaching, their music is straight-to-the-gut thrash metal at a time where the genre was getting more expansive with its themes and sound. For giving Christian metal a thrash hero to rally behind, Deliverance gets the nod for this week’s Retro Recommendation."

== Track listing ==
1. "Victory" 3:44
2. "No Time" 4:28
3. "Deliverance" 3:03
4. "If You Will" 4:23
5. "The Call" 4:10
6. "No Love" 3:30
7. "Blood of the Covenant" 4:50
8. "Jehovah Jireh" 3:35
9. "Temporary Insanity" 5:25 (missing on KMG Classic Archives Value Pak)
10. "Awake" 6:03 (missing on KMG Classic Archives Value Pak)
11. "A Space Called You" 3:51 (2008 bonus track)
12. "Attack" 3:44 (2008 bonus track)

Note: Both bonus tracks originally appeared on the California Metal compilation.

== Personnel ==
Deliverance

- Jimmy P. Brown II – vocals, guitars
- Glenn Rogers – guitars
- Brian Khairullah – bass guitar
- Chris Hyde – drums

Production

- Caesar Kalinowski – producer
- Bill Metoyer – producer
