= Skinhate =

Ukrainian band

- Origin: Pokrov(Ordzho), Ukraine
- Genres: Nu metal, hardcore punk
- Years active: 1998–present
- Label: Moon Records Ukraine
- Members: Yevhen Lashko Dmytro Kustikov; Oleksandr Stepanenko; Vitaliy Kuznetsov; Oleksandr Kukhtin; Valery Klepikov
- Past members: Andriy Diadiura; Oleksandr Yefymenko; Yevhen Lashko; Serhiy Maryshev; Oleksa Fisiuk; Anton Yelisin
- Website: Skinhate

Skinhate (Ukrainian: Скінхейт) is a nu metal/hardcore band from Pokrov, Ukraine.

== History ==
In fact, the history of the band began in the summer of 1994, when Oleksandr Kukhtin, Oleksandr Stepanenko, Andriy Diadiura, Vitaliy Kuznetsov and Oleksandr Yefymenko, changing the names ("Nekropedofil", "Godless", "Virgin Cunt") began to give concerts in small towns of Ukraine. In this period it was created a number of songs that have become mega hit in the era immediately "SkinHate".

In 1998, the band took the name "Hate", which was later changed to "SkinHate".

The first concert took place in Kyiv in 1999. By this time the group has managed to record their own album called "Skinhate", after rewriting Moon Records called "War in heads". The album is dedicated to the memory of one of Andriy 'Yuryk' Diadiura, one of band founders who was killed in 2000.

In 2002 SkinHate recorded the second album – "Ticket to paradise."

In 2006 the band released their 3rd album "All around". Their fourth studio album, entitled НеЯкУсі was released on 1 July 2016. НеЯкУсі was their first album recorded with a new lineup after their guitarist was replaced, and consisted of songs written between 2007–2012. The album was first set to be performed live at the Faine Misto Festival in Ternopil.

In January 2023, the band came under fire after musician Yuriy Bondarchuk highlighted the band's homophobic and misogynistic lyrics from early in their career, specifically in the albums "Війна в головах" and "Квиток до раю", and subsequently the band received calls to be removed from The Best Ukrainian Metal Act (BUMA) ceremony. The scandal caused the host, Yevhen Tymchyk of The Nietzsche and Septa, to withdraw from BUMA. Skinhate responded by stating they no longer performed the songs containing homophobic lyrics besides "Паскуда", as it was one of their most popular songs, and said the lyrics were done in a joking manner.

== Members ==
Active members

- Dmytro Kustikov 'Kust' (Дмитро Кустіков 'Куст') – vocal
- Oleksandr Stepanenko 'Stepan' (Олександр Степаненко 'Степан') – guitar
- Vitaliy Kuznetsov 'Kuzma' (Віталій Кузнецов 'Кузьма') – bass guitar
- Oleksandr Kukhtin 'KyxXxtyA' (Олександр Кухтін 'КухХхтЯ') – drums

Former members

- Andriy Diadiura 'Yuryk' (Андрій Дядюра 'Юрик') – vocal, guitar (1999–2001)
- Yevhen Lashko 'Zh.K.' (Євген Лашко 'Ж. К.') – vocal (1999–2006; 2008–2009)
- Serhiy Maryshev 'Banan' (Сергій Маришев 'Банан') – bass guitar (2004–2008)
- Oleksa Fisiuk (Олекса Фісюк) – bass guitar (2008–2010)
- Anton Yelisin 'Kalyna' (Антон Єлісін 'Калина') – bass guitar (2000–2002)
- Oleksandr Yefymenko 'Yefym' (Олександр Єфименко 'Єфим') – vocal

== Discography ==
Studio albums

- 2001 – Війна в головах (Viyna v holovakh, War in heads)
- 2002 – Квиток до раю (Kvytok do raiu, Ticket to paradise)
- 2003 – Війна в головах + bonus (Viyna v holovakh + bonus, War in heads + bonus; re-released)
- 2004 – Hatemix
- 2006 – Навкруги (Navkruhy, All around)
- 2016 – НеЯкУсі (NeYakUsi, Not like everyone else)

Singles

- 2010 – ZDATEN (Able)
- 2011 – Bull-Dozer
- 2011 – Грань (Hran, Edge)
- 2015 – Як усі (YakUsi, Like everyone else)

== Videography ==
- "Грань" / "Hran"
- "32"

== Interesting facts ==
- Despite the name, guys have no relation to the movement of skinheads and neo-Nazis, but such name has become an obstacle to the publication of their albums in Russia.
- Skinhate's musical style was influenced by such bands: Slayer, Korn, Sepultura, Slipknot, Soulfly, Biohazard, Machine Head and more.
