= Tantrum of the Muse =

American heavy metal band

- Origin: Lancaster, Pennsylvania
- Genres: Christian metal, sludge metal, hardcore punk, noise rock, hard rock
- Years active: 1998–2004
- Labels: Takehold (1998–2002) Burning, (affiliated) Sofa (affiliated)
- Past members: Stephen Sarro; Uldrick Wise; Jason Stauffer; Jim Settle; Seth Luzier; Tyler Lambert

Tantrum of the Muse was a heavy metal band based out of Lancaster County, Pennsylvania. The band formed in 1998 and disbanded in 2004.

== History ==
=== Origin and The Heart is a Two Headed Sperm (1998–2000) ===
Beginning in 1998, when founding member Stephen Mark Sarro (guitar, vocals) and longtime music mate, Udrick Wise (drums) decided to turn their studio project into an actual live band. They recruited their hometown friend, Jason Stauffer (bass) to play with them and put together a couple songs and began playing shows.

The band soon went into the studio to record a new batch of songs, Jason Stauffer left before the recording began and was replaced by Jim Settle soon after the album was completed.The album, which was originally slated for release on Philadelphia's punk label, "Sofa Records in 1998 but Sofa decided to pass on the album.

In 1999, the band played Cornerstone Music Festival, where their reputation for originality caught the attention of Takehold Records, who signed the band and officially re-released The Heart is a Two Headed Sperm.

In 2000, the band entered the studio to record Modernmu$ick(2000)!, their follow-up album which was released July 2000. The band spent three months on the road, touring with Underoath, Narcissus, and Few Left Standing. The response to the album and its content was met with critical praise and controversy. During the band's stint with Takehold Records, they played their most successful shows including Cornerstone Festival and Furnace Fest.

In 2001, the band agreed to release a live album with Ohio-based Burning Records. Burning released The Downtrodden & the Sidhe. The band went on a temporary hiatus. Settle moved to Florida. Wild quit the band to join The Huntingtons. Sarro continued to look for a drummer.

=== Final releases and break-up (2002–2004) ===
In 2002, the band struggled to maintain a solid line up. Udrick left the band to join The Huntingtons full time. During this time Takehold Records merged with Tooth and Nail Records and a deal was offered but the band had decided to stop working, having failed to find a drummer.

Throughout 2003–2004, there were attempts to put the band back together, but this was short lived and Tantrum Of The Muse broke up officially in 2004.

Udrick and Stephen would continue to work together sporadically between 2009 and 2025 with the band Unteachers.

== Members ==
Final line-up

Members	Instruments	Years active	Other projects
Stephen Mark Sarro	vocals, guitar	1998–2004	UnTeachers
Uldrick Wise	drums	1998–2002, 2004	The Huntingtons, UnTeachers
Jim Settle	bass	1998–2002, 2004	Slag, Intercesor, Bore, Hand of Fire, Vengeance Rising, Once Dead
Seth Luzier	keyboards, programming	2002–2004	UnTeachers

Former

- Tyler Lambert – bass (2003–2004)
- Jason Shauffer – bass (1998)

Session

- Trav Turner – drums (ex-Crutch, Solamors, ex-UnTeachers) (2000)

Timeline

== Discography ==
Studio albums

- The Heart is a Two Headed Sperm (Takehold Records – 1999)
- Modernmu$ick(2000)! (Takehold Records – 2000)

Other releases

- The Downtrodden & the Sidhe (Burning Records – 2001)
- Heart Surgery (2003 Sessions) (Independent – 2003)
