= Where Fear and Weapons Meet (album) =

Studio album by 1914
- Released: 22 October 2021
- Recorded: April 2021
- Studio: Jenny Records (Lviv, Ukraine)
- Genre: Blackened death metal; death-doom
- Length: 63:27
- Label: Napalm Records

1914 chronology
The Blind Leading the Blind (2018)	Where Fear and Weapons Meet (2021)	Viribus Unitis (2025)

Singles from Where Fear and Weapons Meet
- 1. "…and a Cross Now Marks His Place" Released: 20 August 2021; 2. "Pillars of Fire (The Battle of Messines)" Released: 24 September 2021; 3. "FN .380 ACP#19074" Released: 22 October 2021

Where Fear and Weapons Meet is the third studio album by the Ukrainian metal band 1914. It was released on 22 October 2021 via Napalm Records.

== Background and themes ==
Following the release of their second album, The Blind Leading the Blind, 1914 signed a contract with Napalm Records, which brought them more attention from the media and heavy music fans, and opened up more opportunities for touring. However, the COVID-19 pandemic stopped the band's concert activity, and the musicians decided to focus on the release of a new album. Work on it began in late November 2020, lasting until March 2021, which the band spent rehearsing and working on material, and in April 2021, the musicians entered the Jenny Records studio in Lviv to record.

Like all of the band's work, Where Fear and Weapons Meet is dedicated to the history of World War I, and most of the songs tell about various events and personalities of that war. The title of the song "FN .380 ACP#19074" refers to the model and serial number of the FN Model 1910 pistol used to kill Archduke Franz Ferdinand, starting World War I. "Don't Tread on Me" is dedicated to the black soldiers of the New York National Guard, also known as the "Harlem Hellfighters". "Vimy Ridge" tells the story of Filip Konowal, a Ukrainian-born Canadian soldier who is the only Eastern European to have received the Victoria Cross. "...and a Cross Now Marks His Place" quotes a real letter addressed to the mother of British Private A.G. Harrison, who was killed in action. The acoustic "Coward" describes the thoughts of a deserter sentenced to death. "Corps d'autos-canons-mitrailleuses" is about the return of a Belgian artillery regiment after fighting. "Pillars of Fire" tells the story of the Battle of Messines.

== Critical reception ==
Professional ratings
Review scores
Source	Rating
Inferno	4/5 stars
Metal Injection	9/10 stars
Metal Hammer	6/7 stars
Metal Storm	8/10 stars
Powermetal.de	8.5/10 stars
Sputnikmusic	4/5 stars

Where Fear and Weapons Meet album was well received by music critics. As with the previous album, The Blind Leading the Blind, the effort to deeply and comprehensively examine the realities and psychology of World War I was praised. While the second album dealt with the lives lost in WWI, Where Fear and Weapons Meet focuses on the survivors, focusing on their feelings and emotions left behind by the war. Max Heilman, in his review for the website Metal Injection, described the album as "painting a tragic, stark and human portrait of World War I with musical bombast and emotional weight." Robert Mueller of Metal Hammer noted the musicians' growth in terms of creativity and particularly praised the improved English of vocalist Dmytro Ternushchak.

Reviewers also praised the band's efforts to expand their musical landscape, which was achieved by including synthesizers, orchestral arrangements and clean vocals on the album. Critics have noted influences from bands such as Bolt Thrower and God Dethroned, as well as the Gothenburg scene of Swedish death metal. The musicians' technical performance has also received praise.

The album has been included in numerous "Best Metal Albums of the Year" lists throughout 2021. Consequence of Sound ranked Where Fear and Weapons Meet at number 13 on their "Top 30 Hard Rock and Metal Albums of 2021" list, writing "[Where Fear and Weapons Meet] takes the sound to the next level with rich production and guest musicians, creating an ambitious, cinematic album that never loses the seriousness of its subject matter and features riffs to match that mood." The album won the 2021 Metal Storm Awards for Best Death Metal Album of the Year. The same website lists the album as the 10th best album of 2021 based on user ratings. Max Heilman of Metal Injection and Phil Boozman of MetalSucks included Where Fear and Weapons Meet in their personal lists of the best albums of the year.

== Charts ==
2021 chart performance for Where Fear and Weapons Meet
Chart (2021)	Peak position
German Albums (Offizielle Top 100)	100
Swiss Albums (Schweizer Hitparade)	71

== Track listing ==
No.	Title	Length
1.	"War In" (instrumental)	1:11
2.	"FN .380 ACP#19074"	5:54
3.	"Vimy Ridge (In Memory of Filip Konowal)"	5:11
4.	"Pillars of Fire (The Battle of Messines)"	7:04
5.	"Don't Tread on Me (Harlem Hellfighters)"	7:54
6.	"Coward"	2:55
7.	"…and a Cross Now Marks His Place"	7:29
8.	"Corps d'autos-canons-mitrailleuses (A.C.M)"	7:54
9.	"Mit Gott für König und Vaterland"	5:18
10.	"The Green Fields of France" (Eric Bogle cover)	10:57
11.	"War Out" (instrumental)	1:40
Total length:		63:27

== Personnel ==
Adapted from Discogs and the Where Fear and Weapons Meet liner notes:

1914

- 2nd Division, 147th Infantry Regiment, Senior Lieutenant Dietmar Kumarberg (Dmytro Ternushchak) – vocals
- 37th Division, Field Artillery Regiment No. 73, watchman Liam Fessen (Oleksa Fisyuk) – guitar
- 5th Division, Ulanensky Regiment No. 3, Sergeant Vitalis Winkelhock (Vitaliy Vyhovskyi) – guitar
- 9th Division, Grenadier Regiment No. 7, non-commissioned officer Armin von Heinessen (Armen Oganesyan) – bass guitar
- 33rd Division, 7th Thuringian Infantry Regiment. No. 96, Private Rusty Potoplakht (Rostyslav Potoplyak) – drums

Additional musicians

- Nick Holmes – additional vocals on "...and a Cross Now Marks His Place"
- Alexander Bulich – additional vocals on "Coward"
- Anna Vasilchenko – bagpipes
- Yuri Siry and The Dead Kaisers Orchestra – conductor and orchestration

Production

- Maryan Kryskuv – recording
- Alexander Backlund – mixing
- Oleksandr Posukhov – sampling
- Vladimir "Smerdulak" Chebakov – cover
