= Fasedown =

American Christian hardcore band

- Also known as: FASEDOWN
- Origin: Fresno, California, U.S.
- Genres: Christian hardcore, metalcore, nu metal
- Years active: 1998–2007, 2009–2011
- Labels: Rescue, Hemorocrit, Retroactive
- Past members: Devin Shaffer; Jim Chaffin; Dana Veit; Matt Hopson-Walker; Jesse Gibson; Mike Phillips; John Hansen
- Website: Fasedown on Facebook

Fasedown are a Christian hardcore band from Fresno, California, that formed in late 1998. Members have also been in Once Dead, The Blamed, Deliverance, The Sacrificed, and many more. In 2015 vocalist Devin Shaffer had "throat setbacks" according to HM Magazine.

== Members ==
Last known / current lineup

- Jim Chaffin – drums (1998–2007, 2009–2011) (Deliverance, The Crucified, The Blamed, Once Dead)
- Devin Shaffer – vocals (1999–2007, 2009–2011) (Once Dead)
- Mike Phillips – lead guitar (1998–2007, 2009–2011) (ex-Deliverance, The Sacrificed, Join the Dead)
- Gary Douglas – rhythm guitar (2009–2011)
- Tim Kronyak – bass (2009–2011) (ex-Deliverance, Join the Dead)

Former

- Jesse Gibson – rhythm guitar (2005–2007)
- Dana Veit – bass (2005)
- John Hansen – bass (1998–2005) (ex-The Blamed)
- Matt "MattMan" Hopson-Walker – bass (2005–2007)

== Discography ==
- Demo (1999–2000; independent)
- Fasedown (2000; Rescue Records)
- Blitz of Anguish (2005; Hematocrit)
