= Hand of Fire =

American thrash metal band

- Origin: Concord, California
- Genre: Thrash metal
- Years active: 2015-present
- Label: Rottweiler
- Members: Jim Settle; Tiago Souza; Gary Neff; Forrest Nelson; Scotty McRib
- Past members: Corey Steger; Tom Eaton; Jason Borton; Greg Christian; Marcel Eaton; Bill Davies
- Website: handoffire.band

Hand of Fire is an American thrash metal band from California. The project was formed in 2010 as a collaboration between Jim Settle (formerly of Tantrum of the Muse) and Corey Steger (formerly of Underoath) before evolving into a full band in 2015 under Settle's leadership. After signing with Rottweiler Records in 2016, they released their debut album, Nuclear Sunrise, in 2017. The band has undergone several lineup changes, including brief stints with former Testament bassist Greg Christian and Jungle Rot drummer Jason Borton. As of 2024, the band consists of Jim Settle (vocals), Tiago Souza (lead guitar), Forrest Nelson (rhythm guitar), Scotty McRib (bass, backing vocals), and Gary Neff (drums). They play a modern take on thrash metal, drawing from classic and contemporary styles.

== Background ==
Hand of Fire started in 2010 as a collaboration between Jim Settle (formerly of Tantrum of the Muse) and Corey Steger (formerly of Underoath). The duo's material caught the attention of Rottweiler Records, who offered them a contract. Geographical constraints led to Steger's departure. Settle established an official lineup featuring members from his other project, Bore.

By 2015, Hand of Fire was a full band fronted by Settle. The band officially signed with Rottweiler Records in May 2016, with a lineup consisting of vocalist Jim Settle, guitarist Tiago Souza, bassist Tom Eaton, and drummer Bill Davies. Their debut album, initially titled Let the Killings Begin, was scheduled for release in December 2016. The band released a lyric video for the title track, and released the album, retitled Nuclear Sunrise, on November 17, 2017, to critical acclaim.

On August 24, 2018, the band premiered the track "World of Deception" on The Covenant Metal Show through Reanimated Radio. The band underwent lineup changes in March 2019. Bassist Tom Eaton and drummer Bill Davies departed, replaced with Greg Christian (ex-Testament) and Jason Borton (Jungle Rot, Kataklysm), respectively. By March 2020, Davies returned to the band and Marcel Eaton, formerly of Trauma, joined as the new bassist, replacing Borton and Christian. Corey Steger died in a car accident on March 17, 2021.

== Members ==
Current members
Name	Instrument	Years	Other groups
Jim Settle	lead vocals	2010–present	Tantrum of the Muse, Once Dead, Vengeance Rising, Slag, Bore, Intercessor
Tiago James Souza	lead guitar	2015–present	Bore, Perpetual Paranoia, Through the Clouds, Godman, The Thomas Thompson Earth Project
Gary Neff	drums	2024–present	Shadowkiller, Forced Psychosis, Power Shift, Roswell
Forrest Nelson	rhythm guitar	2024–present	
Scotty McRib	bass, backing vocals	2024–present	Almost Dead, WarTroll, Gurschach, Karmic Debt

Former members
Name	Instrument	Years	Other groups
Corey Steger	lead guitar	2010-2015 (died 2021)	Underoath, Symmetry Point
Tom Eaton	bass	2015-2018	Bomb and Scary, Something Left Unsaid, Bore
Greg Christian	bass	2019–2020	Testament, Trauma, HavocHate, Fallen Trinity, Wreck-Defy, Legacy, Meshiaak
Jason Borton	drums	2019–2020	Jungle Rot, Kataklysm, Throne of Awful Splendor, Treasonist, Thanatopsis, Where Lovers Rot, Seized of Darkness, Velaraas, Zorakarer, Arkaik, Mortal Plague, Beyond the Red Horizon, Nocturnal Plague, Zero Divide
Marcel Eaton	bass	2020–2024	Trauma, Discordia, Serpent & Seraph
Bill Davies	drums	2015-2019, 2020–2023	Chürchfield, Bore

Timeline

== Discography ==
Demo

- Let the Killings Begin (2016)

Studio albums

- Nuclear Sunrise (2017)
- World of Deception (TBA)

Singles

- "Let the Killings Begin" (2016)
- "Deck the Angels" (2016)
- "The Prophecy" (2017)
- "World of Deception" (2018)

Compilation appearances

- The Bearded Dragon's Sampler: Third Times a Charm (2017; The Bearded Dragon Productions)
- The Pack Vol. 1 (2017; Rottweiler)
