= Once Dead (album) =

Studio album by Vengeance Rising
- Released: 1990
- Recorded: 1990 California
- Genre: Christian metal, thrash metal, speed metal
- Length: 54:35
- Label: Intense Records

Vengeance Rising chronology
Human Sacrifice (1988)	Once Dead (1990)	Destruction Comes (1991)

Professional ratings
Review scores
Source	Rating
Cross Rhythms	7/10 stars
Metal Storm	7.2/10

Once Dead is the second studio album by Christian death and thrash metal band Vengeance Rising, released in 1990 on Intense Records and re-released in November 2010 on Intense Millennium Records.

According to Allmusic, both the debut and Once Dead "were huge successes in the world of Christian music, making Vengeance Rising one of the few bands in the genre to cross over into the secular music scene". In 2010 HM Magazine ranked Once Dead #45 on Top 100 Christian metal albums of all-time list.

Musically, the album showed an influence of speed metal, with thrash arrangements on some songs, like the cover of Deep Purples' Space Truckin', and "Out Of The Will", which reminded one reviewer of One Bad Pig. In a Cross Rhythms review, the lyrics were called "very Bible based," containing quotes and references accompanied within the lyrics "giving enough material for weeks of Bible studies". The reviewer went to state that the album "leaves most other Christian metal albums well behind in terms of imagination and sheer execution." Doc Godin of Metal Storm said that while most Christian metal is rather safe and predictable, "here's something that actually kinda kicks ass, all ideologies aside." They described the album's style as mostly straightforward thrash similar to that of Slayer and Sodom and compared Roger Martinez's vocals to those of Martin van Drunen.

== Track listing ==
1. Warfare - 4:50
2. Can't Get Out - 3:50
3. Cut Into Pieces - 3:15
4. Frontal Lobotomy - 4:05
5. Herod's Violent Death - 3:07
6. The Whipping Post - 8:40
7. Arise - 4:50
8. Space Truckin' (Deep Purple cover) - 5:00
9. Out Of The Will - 2:04
10. The Wrath To Come - 2:43
11. Into The Abyss - 8:18
12. Among The Dead - 3:03
13. Interruption - 0:50

== Personnel ==
Vengeance

- Roger Martinez - Vocals
- Larry Farkas - Lead Guitar
- Doug Thieme - Rhythm Guitar
- Roger Dale Martin - Bass
- Glenn Mancaruso - Drums
