= Grave Robber (band) =

American horror punk band

- Origin: Fort Wayne, Indiana, U.S.
- Genre: Horror punk
- Years active: 2005–present
- Labels: Rottweiler, Retroactive
- Members: Wretched; Viral; Carcass; Plague
- Past members: Lamentor; Dr. Cadaver; De Muerte; Nameless; Maggot; Rot; Grimm
- Website: facebook.com/OfficialGraveRobber

Grave Robber is an American horror punk band from Fort Wayne, Indiana. The band started rehearsing in 2005. In 2006, Grave Robber released a vinyl EP, Love Hurts independently. Their first two studio albums, Be Afraid and Inner Sanctum, were released by Retroactive Records, correspondingly in 2008 and 2009. The subsequent three studio albums, Exhumed, You're All Gonna Die!, and Escaping The Grave were released by Rottweiler Records, correspondingly in 2010, 2011, and 2018. An EP, Straight To Hell was released in 2014. Rottweiler Records has acquired the rights to Be Afraid and Inner Sanctum, with plans to re-release in 2023.

== Background ==
Grave Robber is a punk band of the horror punk variety. They are from Fort Wayne, Indiana, were they formed as a group in October 2005. Their members are vocalist Wretched, bassist Carcass, guitarist Viral, and drummer Plague.

== Music history ==
The band commenced their musical recording careers in 2008, with their first studio album, Be Afraid, that was released on April 29, 2008, with Retroactive Records. While their subsequent studio album, Inner Sanctum, was released by Retroactive Records, on January 1, 2009. They released, Exhumed, a studio album, with Rottweiler Records, on December 4, 2010. Their fourth studio album, You're All Gonna Die!, was released on November 7, 2011, by Rottweiler Records. On October 14, 2014. Straight to Hell, a limited edition 4 song EP was released. Escaping The Grave, the band's fifth full-length release was released April 13, 2018.

== Members ==
=== Characters ===
==== Current members ====
- Wretched – lead vocals
- Viral – guitar, backing vocals
- Carcass – bass, backing vocals
- Plague – drums

==== Former members ====
- Rot – drums
- Dr. Cadaver – drums, bass, backing vocals
- Nameless – guitar
- Maggot – bass
- Lamentor – guitar, backing vocals
- De Muerte – drums, backing vocals
- Grimm – guitar, backing vocals

=== Members ===
==== Current members ====
- Shawn Browning – vocals
- Andy Whitten – guitar, backing vocals
- Joe Jones – guitar, backing vocals
- Craig Weitz – bass, backing vocals
- Nick Fairchild - Drums

==== Former members ====
- Dan Kinnaley (ex-guitar)
- Morrison Agen (ex-bass)
- Chuck Thomas (ex-drums)
- Mark Mettert (ex-bass/drums)
- Dave Oliver (ex-drums)
- Christian Morris (ex-drums)
- Grant Butler (ex-guitar)
- Zach Hull (ex-drums)
- Mike Walter (ex-guitar)
- Shawn Spano (ex-drums)
- Sam Ochsner (ex-drums)
- Craig Weitz (ex-bass, ex-drums)
- Chris Houk (ex-guitar)
- Gene Feasel (ex-bass)
- Jon Dorris (ex-guitar)
- Justin Ramage (ex-drums)
- Joe Jones (ex-bass)
- Nick Fairchild (ex-drums)

== Discography ==
Studio albums

- Be Afraid (April 29, 2008, Retroactive)
- Inner Sanctum (January 1, 2009, Retroactive)
- Exhumed (December 4, 2010, Rottweiler)
- You're All Gonna Die! (November 7, 2011, Rottweiler)
- Escaping the Grave! (2018, Rottweiler)
- Dry Bones (2019, Rottweiler)
- Scary Christmas To You (2019, Rottweiler)

EPs

- Love Hurts (2006)
- Straight to Hell (EP) (January 21, 2015, Rottweiler)
- Untote Leichen (2019, Sick Taste Records)
- Xmas Is The Worst (2022)

Compilation appearances

- The Pack Vol. 1 (2016; Rottweiler)
- Metal From The Dragon (Vol. 2) (2017; The Bearded Dragon Productions)
