= Neon Cross =

American Christian metal band

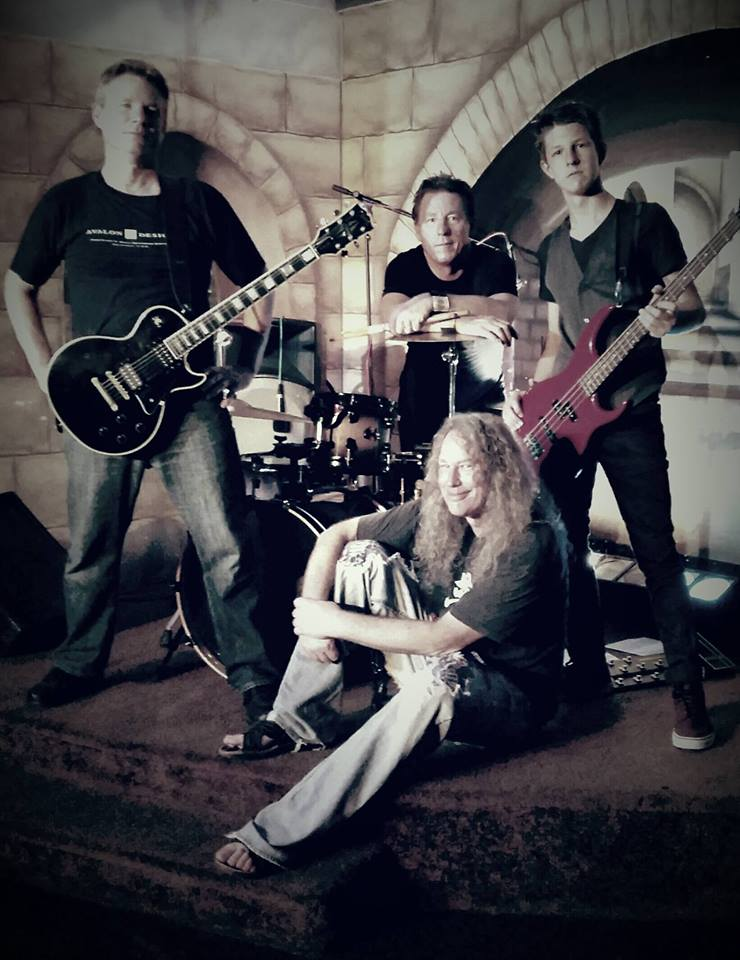

Background information
- Origin: Hollywood, California, U.S.
- Genres: Heavy metal, power metal, Christian metal
- Years active: 1984–present
- Labels: Regency
- Members: David Raymond Reeves; Don Webster; Terry Russell; Colton Russell
- Past members: Ed (Goodwin) Ott, Mike Betts, Mitchell Kent, Troy Woody, David Starkey, Scot Strickland
- Website: neoncrossmusic.com

Neon Cross is an American Christian metal band that was formed in Hollywood, California, in 1984. Neon Cross started playing clubs in Hollywood during the 1980s, and attracted the attention of record company Regency Records in 1988. The band was asked to record two songs for their upcoming California Metal compilation album. After the release of that record, Neon Cross was signed to Regency to record their self-titled album, which was released the same year.

In 1993, the band got back together and was signed by Rugged Records to record their second full-length CD, Torn. Neon Cross has been performing in the US, with Dave Reeves and Don Webster being asked by Liberty N' Justice to record a song for a compilation album. The song, "Snake Eat Snake", was recorded in Don Webster's studio and features all members of the band performing on the song.

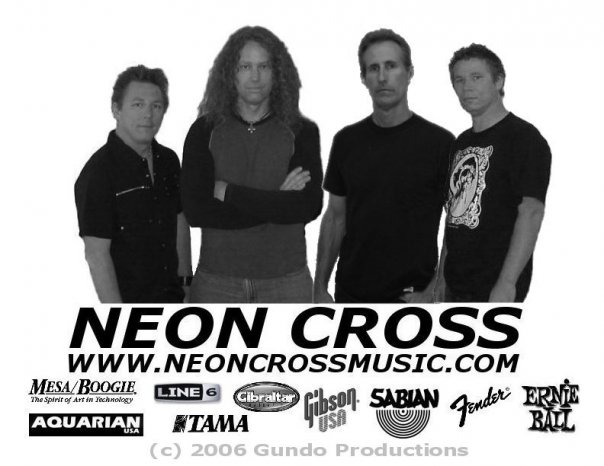
Neon Cross in 2000

== Band members ==
- David Raymond Reeves – vocals
- Don Webster – guitars
- Colton Russell – bass guitar
- Terry Russell – drums
- Larry Farkas – guitars

Past members

- Mike Betts – drums (1983–1989)
- Mitch Kent – bass guitar (1983–1986)
- Ed (Goodwin) Ott – bass guitar (1987–1990)
- Dave Starkey – bass guitar (1994–2006)
- Scot Strickland – bass guitar (2006–2012)
- Troy Woody – drums (1994–1996)

Personal Management: Greg Burnham, FTC Entertainment Group (1985-1986)

== Discography ==
- Neon Cross (1987)
- Torn (1995)
- Neon Cross Limited Edition Series (2001) – Reissue of 1987 album + bonus songs

=== Compilations (various artists) ===
- California Metal (1987) – This is the first recording with Neon Cross songs. Contains songs "Need Your Love" & "Son of God".
- Ultimate Metal (1989) – This CD contains the unauthorized release of "Heart Breaker". It was released without the band's permission.
- Premium Cuts (1994) – Contains songs "Buy My Record", "Mystery of Love" & "In Your Mind".
- Rugged Cuts (1996) – Contains songs "Bitterness" & "Video Smut".
- Liberty N' Justice: Independence Day (2007, LNJ Records) – Contains the song "Snake Eat Snake".

=== Top songs ===
- "Son of God" from California Metal
- "Heartbreaker" from self-titled album
- "Mystery of Love" from Premium Cuts
- "Bitterness" from Torn

== Other sources ==
- Hale, Mark (1993). "2010". Headbangers (First edition, second printing ed.). Ann Arbor, Michigan: Popular Culture, Ink. p. 241. ISBN 1-56075-029-4.
- Powell, Mark Allan (2002). Encyclopedia of Contemporary Christian Music (First printing ed.). Peabody, Massachusetts: Hendrickson Publishers. p. 623. ISBN 1-56563-679-1.
