= Glenn Rogers (musician) =

American guitarist (born 1966)

- Born: January 8, 1966 (age 59)
- Genres: Christian metal, heavy metal, thrash metal
- Occupation: Guitarist
- Years active: 1986–1991, 2003–present
- Website: Glenn Rogers on Facebook

Glenn Rogers is an American guitarist who performs mainly thrash metal. He has most notably performed with Hirax, Deliverance, Vengeance Rising and Once Dead.

== History ==
Glenn Rogers started his career in 1986, with his first band Blind Decree, later known as Dissenter, with his friend Brett Eriksen. He later joined the band Vengeance Rising and wrote music that would eventually end up on Human Sacrifice. He left the band and joined a project with former Holy Soldier vocalist Robbie Brauns named H.E.R.O. He joined Deliverance soon after joining H.E.R.O. Rogers stated his first show with the band went so well, he left H.E.R.O. and recorded the demo Greetings of Death with the band. The band recorded the debut self-titled album in 1989 before leaving. During his time in Deliverance, Rogers joined the band Steel Vengeance. His stint with Steel Vengeance lasted about four years, before taking a break in his musical career. Rogers joined Hirax in 2003 and stuck with them for several years, leaving and rejoining several times. The first time he left, he gave an explanation on why he left

Due to the fact that Katon would not communicate with his own band, we had to cancel our flight plans. As a result, we as a band felt we could not continue as members of HIRAX. We will however seek a new singer, and carry on

He launched a one-off project with Daniel Cordova (formerly of Vengeance Rising) called Lambs Among Wolves in 2010. In 2011, Rogers reformed the band Metal Blade Records recording artists Viking and a project of his own with Cordova entitled Final Decree. Neither band progressed with Rogers, until 2016, when Rogers resurrected Final Decree with Cordova and Martin DeBourge. DeBourge later on left the band and was replaced by Sammy DeJohn (Ruthless). In 2017, it was announced that George Ochoa had departed from Deliverance yet a second time, being replaced by Rogers who had originally been replaced by Ochoa. Rogers appeared on The Subversive Kind in 2018.

== Bands ==
Current

- Final Decree (2011, 2016–present)
- Deliverance (1987–1989, 2011 [live], 2017–present)
- Primal (2014–present)

Former

- Blind Decree (1986)
- Dissenter (1986–1987)
- Vengeance Rising (1987)
- H.E.R.O. (1987)
- Steel Vengeance (1988–1991)
- Hirax (2003–2005, 2006–2007, 2008–2011)
- Heretic (2011–2014)
- Lamb Among Wolves (2010)
- Once Dead (2006– 2018)
