= Sacred Warrior =

Christian heavy metal band

- Origin: Chicago, Illinois
- Genres: Christian metal, heavy metal
- Years active: 1988–1994, 2000, 2008–present
- Label: Intense
- Members: Rey Parra; Bruce Swift; Tony Velasquez; Steve Watkins; Tom Sanderson; Erik Schelling
- Past members: Rick Macias; Jon Johnson; Eli Prinsen; Joe Petit
- Website: sacredwarrior.net

Sacred Warrior is a Christian heavy metal band formed in 1988 and based in Chicago, Illinois. Their music is often compared to that of Queensrÿche or Iron Maiden.

== Background ==
The band was formed out of a general market metal band known as Nomad, which formed in 1985. Subsequent to the conversion of guitarist Bruce Swift to Christianity, he led fellow band members Tony Velasquez and Rey Parra. He also converted Rick Macias, who had been a bouncer at a nightclub.

Their first album, Rebellion, was released in 1988 and supported its release on a tour with Rez in 1989. The album impressed Dave Reynolds, who rated it with KKKK1/2 on its review for Kerrang! in February 1989: "It actually had my head banging away for all it's worth!". Later that year, Master's Command was released, featuring guest vocals from Vengeance Rising frontman Roger Martinez. Their third release, Wicked Generation, was considered a partial concept album about a young person struggling with life seeking hope. Their fourth album was 1991's Obsessions, a more straightforward melodic metal album. The band initially broke up in 1994. The band performed at a reunion show in 2001 at the Cornerstone Festival which was recorded and released on CD later that year.

In 2008, the band reformed and began performing shows. Keyboardist Rick Macias died on February 9, 2009. On April 23, 2012, lead vocalist Rey Parra announced he has left the band due to time constraints and distance issues. He lives in Florida, while the rest of the band is from the Chicago, Illinois area.

Parra rejoined the band in 2016 and released the single "Slave" in advance of a full album. He left Sacred Warrior again in 2019 to focus on a new band after releasing "Blood River" as a single.

In 2020, after a nationwide search, Erik Schelling, another native of the Chicago area, joined the band as lead vocalist. They released a single and music video in the summer of 2020, reprising the old worship song “On Christ the Solid Rock I Stand”.

In 2023 the band officially reunited with original vocalist Rey Parra and has played venues at the BMI Event Center in Versailles, OH at events like Christian Music Festival and opening for Queensryche. In 2024, the band played in Germany, and continues to book more shows in the Chicago area and around the country, picking up where they left off in the early 1990s. The band is currently writing and recording new music at Gathering Storm Media in Aurora, Illinois.

== Discography ==
- 1987: 12-song demo/rehearsal tape
- 1988: Rebellion (Intense Records)
- 1989: Master's Command (Review: Cross Rhythms)
- 1990: Wicked Generation (Review: Cross Rhythms, CCM Magazine)
- 1991: Obsessions (Review: Cross Rhythms)
- 1993: Classics (Intense Records)
- 2001: Live at Cornerstone 2001
- 2001: Demo (Bottomline)
- 2013: Waiting in Darkness

== Members ==
Current

- Bruce Swift – guitars, backing vocals (1988–1994, 2000, 2008–present)
- Tony Velasquez – drums (1988–1994, 2000, 2008–present)
- Steve Watkins – bass, keyboards, backing vocals (1988–1994, 2000, 2008–present)
- Tom Sanderson – keyboards, backing vocals (2016–present)
- Rey Parra – lead vocals (1988–1994, 2000, 2008–2012, 2016–2019, 2023–present)

Former

- Erik Schelling- lead vocals (2020–2021)
- Eli Prinsen – lead vocals (2012–2016)
- Rick Macias – keyboards (1988–1989)
- Jon Johnson – guitars (1989–1990)
- Joe Petit – keyboards, backing vocals (1991–1994, 2000, 2008–2016)
