= Holy Soldier =

American rock band

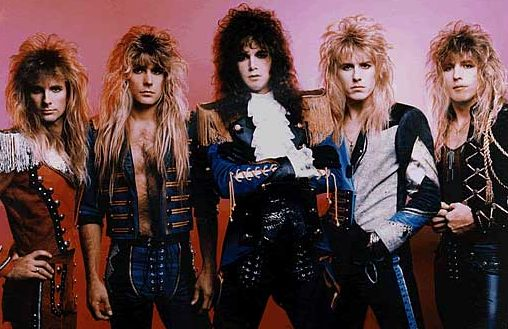
- Holy Soldier publicity photo

Background information
- Origin: Los Angeles, California, U.S.
- Genres: Christian metal, hard rock, glam metal
- Years active: 1985–1997, 2005–2006 (reunions)
- Labels: Myrrh/A&M, ForeFront/EMI, Spaceport
- Past members: Andy Robbins; Terry "Animal" Russell; Chris Hyde; Jamie Cramer; Michael Cutting; Robbie Brauns; Larry Farkas; Steven Patrick; Eric Wayne; Scott Soderstrom; Jason Martin; Don Russell
- Website: holysoldier.com

Holy Soldier was a Christian hard rock/glam metal band from Los Angeles, formed in 1985. They released three studio albums.

== History ==
The band was originally formed in early 1985 by bassist Andy Robbins and guitarist Jamie Cramer. The band gained a strong local following before signing to A&M Records in 1989. Holy Soldier was initially noted for their strong evangelical focus, although they regularly played to mainstream audiences. For a time they held one of the largest attendance records at Gazzarri's, a notable nightclub in the Hollywood circuit. In 1989 they signed to Myrrh Records, an imprint of Word/A&M, as that label's first Hard Rock act. Their self-titled debut, produced by David Zaffiro, was released in 1990 to critical acclaim and moderate commercial success. The band garnered two Dove Awards in 1991, in the hard rock song and album of the year categories. After heavy touring the band lost two members – lead vocalist Steven Patrick, and guitarist Michael Cutting.

The band replaced the members with Eric Wayne and Scott Soderstrom while continuing to tour. Wayne exited when Steven Patrick returned in 1991, but would again rejoin the group in 1995. Two years later, the band followed up their debut with Last Train. While praised, it was not a commercial success. Although Last Train charted, peaking at the No. 10 slot on Billboard's CCM chart, the album did not meet the sales expectations of the label, and the band was dropped from their roster. A review in CCM magazine found that although the band's sound had progressed, their lyrics had shifted from evangelicalism to a more ambiguous tone. Additionally, the band was criticized by some in Christian music for attempting to be a "crossover success" into the general market.

The band experienced personnel changes when Steven Patrick again departed. The band again replaced Patrick with Seattle-based vocalist Eric Wayne, who helped move the band into the current grunge sound seen in the marketplace. Wayne's lower vocal register caused Holy Soldier to be compared in the alternative hard rock and grunge market with the likes of Pearl Jam, Stone Temple Pilots, Temple of the Dog, and Soundgarden. After Holy Soldier's reinvention and extensive touring, the band was signed to ForeFront Records in 1994. Once again recruiting the production skills of producer David Zaffiro, Holy Soldier released Promise Man in 1995. Promise Man returned the band to critical acclaim within Christian music circuit, again winning the band Dove Awards for in the hard rock song (for title track Promise Man) and album of the year categories. Despite the success of Promise Man, Holy Soldier was unhappy with the lack of support they received from their record label ForeFront Records and the band requested to be let out of their contract with their label. In 1997, after a short hiatus, bassist Andy Robbins independently produced on his own boutique label (Spaceport Records) a live retrospective album featuring both current frontman Eric Wayne and original vocalist Steven Patrick. After the release of Encore, Holy Soldier officially disbanded.

In 2005, the original Holy Soldier lineup reunited in August for a benefit concert and possible studio album follow-up. But again, Steven Patrick's reunion with his former band members was extremely brief. Suddenly without its original lead vocalist for a third time, Holy Soldier recruited original drummer Terry Russell's brother, Don, to replace Patrick to perform for a string of festival dates in mid-2006.

== Members ==
Final lineup

- Andy Robbins – bass, guitar, backing vocals (1985–1997, 2005–2006)
- Michael Cutting – guitar, mandolin, backing vocals (1985–1991, 1993–1997, 2005–2006)
- Jamie Cramer – guitar, backing vocals (1985–1992, 2005–2006)
- Terry "Animal" Russell – drums, backing vocals (1985–1995, 2005–2006)
- Don Russell – lead vocals (2005–2006)

Former

- Robbie Brauns – lead vocals (1985–1987)
- Steven Patrick – lead vocals, acoustic guitar (1988–1990, 1991–1992, 1997, 2005–2006)
- Eric Wayne – lead vocals (1990, 1993–1997)
- Larry Farkas – guitar (1985)
- Scott Soderstrom – guitar (1991–1997)
- Chris Hyde – drums (1985)
- Jason Martin – drums (1995–1997)
- Andy Robbins (the Andy Robbins from Skin is not the same person as in Holy Soldier)
- Evelyn Watson – 1990 (backing vocals for the self-titled album and for a short time performed on stage)

== Discography ==
Studio albums

- 1990 – Holy Soldier (Myrrh Records / A&M Records, produced by David Zaffiro)
- 1992 – Last Train (Myrrh Records, produced by David Zaffiro)
- 1995 – Promise Man (ForeFront / EMI Records, produced by David Zaffiro)

Live albums

- 1997 – Encore (Spaceport Records, produced by Andy Robbins, Michael Cutting & David Zaffiro, February 8, 1997 @ Rocketown, Nashville, Tennessee)

DVDs

- 2006 – Live, Rare and Raw (Roxx Productions/Spaceport Records)
