= Precious Death =

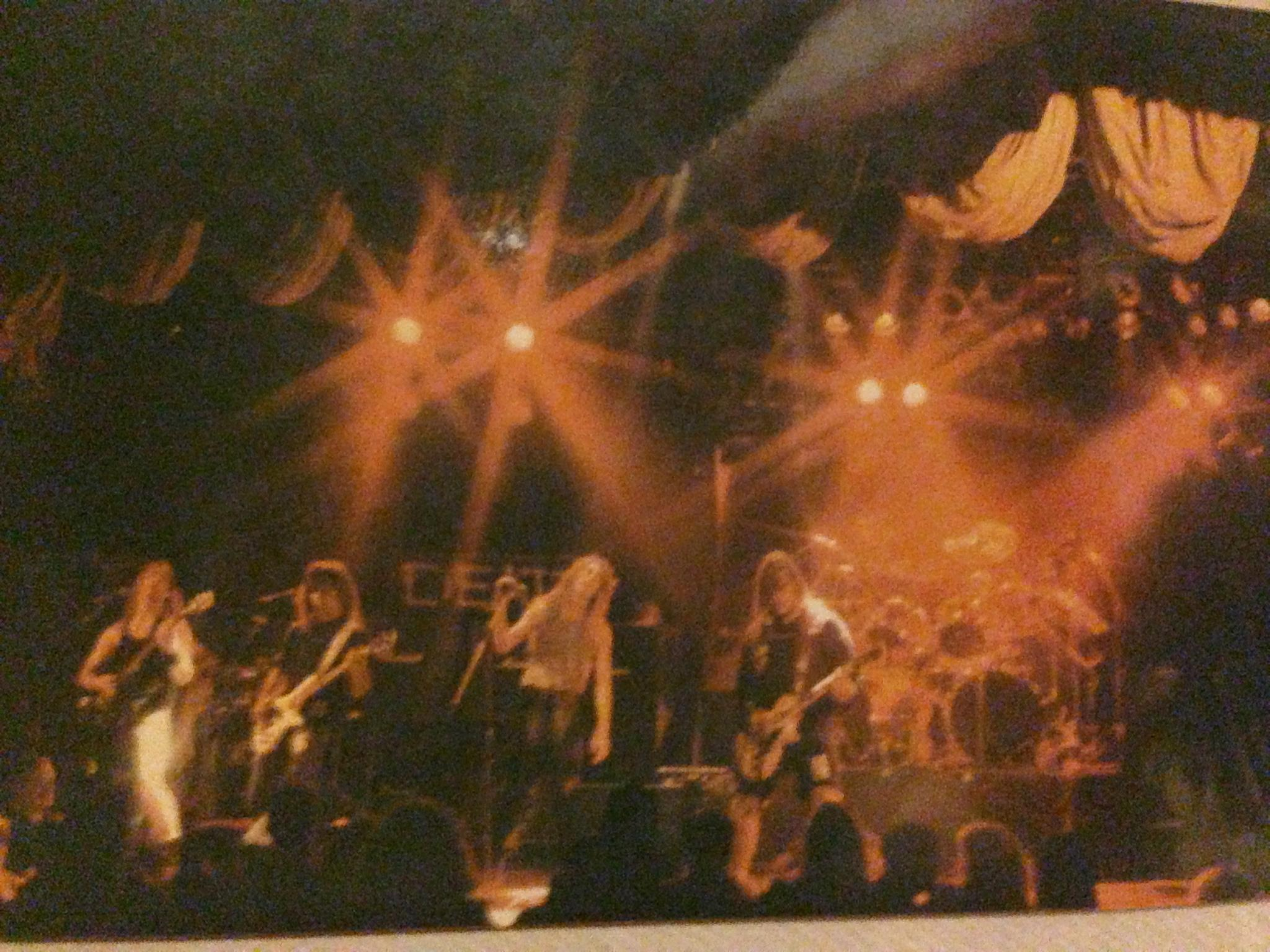

Background information
- Origin: Los Angeles, California
- Genres: Funk Metal, Grunge, Crossover thrash, Christian metal
- Years active: 1989-1999
- Label: Metro One
- Spinoffs: Blackball
- Members: Christopher Scott; David Bishop; Andy Koehler; Roger Sampson
- Website: Preciousdeath.com

Precious Death is a Southern California heavy metal band from the 1990s. The group was known for intense live shows that won over the local scene in L.A. before broadening their audience the rest of the country. They were a regular favorite at KNAC nights, on the Hollywood strip, and at summer music festivals. The group wrote songs with a Christian message. Singer Christopher Scott and guitarist David Bishop went on to form Blackball as a side project. Precious Death won album of the year and rock song of the year at the LA Music Awards and was nominated for Dove awards. The band's album, Southpaw, was ranked in one of the Top 10 essential Christian metal albums by Loudersound.

Precious Death was a Los Angeles-based heavy metal band active during the 1990s, known for their dynamic fusion of metal, grunge, and crossover thrash elements, often incorporating Christian themes into their lyrics. The band was formed in 1989 and consisted of:

Christopher Scott – Vocals

David Bishop – Guitar

Andy Koehler – Bass

Roger Sampson – Drums

They gained a reputation for their intense live performances, becoming regulars at venues like the Whisky a Go Go and the Roxy on the Sunset Strip, as well as at summer music festivals. Their debut album, Southpaw (1993), received critical acclaim, winning "Album of the Year" and "Rock Song of the Year" at the LA Music Awards, and earning a nomination for a Dove Award.

In 2021 the band began working on new material, with plans for a new album in the works. Their music is celebrated for its unique blend of styles and heartfelt lyrics.

"Our Stinkin' Demo" (a lesser known true fan favorite) is the debut release by Precious Death, a heavy metal band from Los Angeles, California. Recorded in 1990 and released in 1991, this demo cassette introduced the band's unique blend of thrash, funk, and heavy metal influences. The tracklist includes:

The Depth of My Soul

I Will

Forcefed

Walls

According to the official Precious Death website, "Walls" was the first song the band wrote together, with bassist Andy Koehler taking the lead in its creation, while vocalist Chris Scott contributed lyrics and vocals. "Force Fed" was brought in by Scott from his previous work before joining Precious Death, making it the only song from before the band's formation in 1990. "The Depth of My Soul" was co-written by Scott, with Koehler and guitarist David Bishop contributing to its breakdown and lead sections. Koehler and drummer Roger Sampson collaborated on "I Will," another track that became a staple in their live performances.

This demo captures the raw energy of Precious Death's early performances and is considered by fans to embody the band's live sound authentically. Some listeners feel that this demo best represents the band's live feel compared to their later studio recordings.

"Our Stinkin' Demo" was originally released as a cassette tape, which was collected by people. In 2021, the demo was made available on streaming platforms.

"Oddballs and Endings: Things Left Unsaid" is an album by Precious Death featuring unreleased tracks and live versions produced by legendary rock producer Brian Garcia.

== Members ==
- Christopher Scott - vocals (1990–present)
- Andy Koehler - bass (1987–present)
- David Bishop - guitars (1987–present)
- Roger Sampson - drums (1988–present)

== Discography ==
Studio albums

- Our Stinkin Demo (1992)
- Southpaw (1993)
- If You Must (1994)
- Precious Death (New Music For The Quiet Revolution) (1996)
- The Greatest Hits: Volume One (2021)
- The Greatest Hits: Volume Two (2021)
- Oddballs and Endings: Things left unsaid (2021)
- Red Moon Rising: Part One (2025)
