= Deliverance (metal band) =

American metal band

- Origin: Los Angeles, California, U.S.
- Genres: Christian metal; thrash metal; speed metal; progressive metal; alternative rock
- Years active: 1985–1996; 2001–2002; 2006–present
- Labels: Intense/Frontline; Brainstorm Artists Intl.; Indie Dream; Magdalene; Retroactive; Roxx
- Members: Jimmy P. Brown II; George Ochoa; Brian Khairullah; Jim Chaffin
- Past members: Larry Farkas; Glenn Rogers; Mike Phillips; Jonathan Maddux; Marcus N. Colon; Lael Clark; Mike Grato; Manny Morales; Tim Kronyak; Victor Macias; Chris Hyde; Kevin Lee; Jon Knox; Jeff Mason; Mike Reed
- Website: deliverance23.com

Deliverance is an American Christian metal band. A progenitor of Christian thrash metal, they shifted towards progressive metal and alternative rock. The band was founded by Jimmy P. Brown II in 1985, who has been the only constant member through numerous lineup changes.

== History ==
=== Formation and early albums (1985–1992) ===
Jimmy P. Brown II formed Deliverance in 1985 in Los Angeles. They debuted in 1989 with Deliverance, followed up by Weapons of Our Warfare in 1990, What a Joke in 1991, and Stay of Execution in 1992. These releases featured traditional thrash and speed metal. The band was a Christian thrash metal pioneer. The debut album earned them the label of Metallica clones, sometimes meant as praise. Weapons of Our Warfare is considered the band's peak. The music video for the title song earned regular airplay on MTV Headbangers Ball, and in 1999, Metallica's Lars Ulrich listed the video on his Top 10 metal videos. On Stay of Execution, the band's sound changed to accommodate the music scene. That release moved from thrash and speed metal into progressive metal and alternative metal.

=== Three more albums and first breakup (1992–1996) ===
The sonic changes begun with Stay of Execution became permanent with subsequent releases Learn (1993), River of Disturbance (1994), and Camelot in Smithereens (1995). The previous comparisons to Metallica gave way to comparisons to Queensrÿche. River of Disturbance marked another dramatic shift in sound for the group with an alternative rock style that as a more popular genre than metal at the time. It included a rap rock collaboration with the hip-hop group 12th Tribe. After the release of Camelot in Smithereens, the group disbanded.

=== Reformation, breakup, and reformation (2001–2010) ===
Deliverance reformed in 2001 and released the album Assimilation, before once again breaking up. In 2006, Deliverance reformed with a lineup of Jimmy P. Brown II, Mike Phillips, Corin Jae Scott, Tim Kronyak, and Mike Reed. The band's seventh studio album, As Above - So Below, was released on April 24, 2007.

In 2010, Deliverance played the only show without Jimmy P. Brown II at NordicFest.

=== Third breakup and another reunion (2011–present) ===
On May 20, 2011 Mike Phillips announced that Deliverance was finally coming to end and would be performing their final show in August 2011. However, by July 2012, Deliverance had resurfaced again and been working on their tenth studio album Hear What I Say!, which was released on September 3, 2013 on Roxx Records and was planned as their final album. However, Jimmy Brown had later stated that Hear What I Say! would most likely not be their final album.

Though Brown stated that Hear What I Say! would be the last album, he announced that Deliverance would release new material in 2016. The band, whose lineup consists of former guitarist George Ochoa, former drummer Jim Chaffin and bassist Victor Máciás, played Exodo Fest in Mexico with Silent Planet and Grave Robber. In 2017, the self-titled album was re-released on vinyl through Roxx, and Weapons of Our Warfare was re-released through Bombworks Records. Later on in the year, it was announced that guitarist Glenn Rogers had returned to the band and that Ochoa had departed. It was also stated that Greg Minier (The Crucified) would record solos on the album. On September 28, 2017, it was announced that Deliverance had signed to Roxx Records and 3 Frogz Records, who released the band's eleventh studio album, The Subversive Kind, in early 2018. On October 28, 2017, the band released their debut single off of the album, "The Black Hand", accompanied with a lyric video. On February 20, 2020 the band announced bassist Victor Macias was going to be replaced with Manny Morales.

By early 2024, Deliverance had once again reunited bassist Brian Khairullah and guitarist George Ochoa. The band also has a new studio album in the works, tentatively titled Twelve.

== Discography ==
Studio albums

- Deliverance (1989, Intense Records)
- Weapons of Our Warfare (1990, Intense Records)
- What a Joke (1991, Intense Records)
- Stay of Execution (1992, Intense Records)
- Learn (1993, Intense Records)
- River Disturbance (1994, Brainstorm Artists, Intl)
- Camelot in Smithereens (1995, Intense Records)
- Assimilation (2001, Indie Dream Records)
- As Above - So Below (2007, Retroactive Records)
- Hear What I Say! (2013, Roxx Records)
- The Subversive Kind (2018, Roxx Records)
- Camelot in Smithereens Deluxe ReDux (2022, Retroactive)

Other albums

- Intense Records Presents: Recorded Live, Vol. 1 (1992, Intense Records)
- A Decade of Deliverance compilation (1994, Intense Records)
- Back In the Day: The First Four Years compilation (2000, Magdalene Records) reissued in 2007 as The First Four Years
- Greetings of Death, etc. compilation (2001, Magdalene Records) (2007, Retroactive Records)
- Live at Cornerstone 2001 (2001, Magdalene Records)

Other releases

- Hot Metal Summer II Sex, Drugs & Rock n' Roll (1989, compilation on Frontline Records)
- Hot Metal Summer III Hot Licks - Cold Facts (1990, compilation on Intense Records)
- Hot Metal Summer 4 The Video (1991, VHS video Intense Records)
- I Predict a Clone: A Steve Taylor Tribute (1994, tribute to Steve Taylor)
- Metal from the Dragon (Vol. 2) (2017, compilation on The Bearded Dragon Productions)

== Members ==
Current

- Jimmy P. Brown II – vocals, guitar (1985–present)
- George Ochoa – guitar (1989–1991, 2014–2017, 2024–present)
- Brian Khairullah – bass (1985–1990, 1992–1993, 2024–present)
- Jim Chaffin – drums (1990–1991, 2014–present)

Former

- Larry Farkas – guitar (1985–1987)
- Glenn Rogers – guitar (1987–1989, 2017–2024)
- Mike Phillips – guitar (1991–1993, 2006–2014)
- Jonathan Maddux – guitar (1993–1995)
- Marcus N. Colon – guitar (1995–1996)
- Lael Clark – guitar (2001–2002)
- Mike Grato – bass (1991–1992)
- Manny Morales – bass (1993–2002, 2012–2014, 2020–2024)
- Tim Kronyak – bass (2006–2011)
- Victor Macias – bass (2014–2020)
- Chris Hyde – drums (1985–1990; died 2015)
- Kevin Lee – drums (1991–1993)
- Jon Knox – drums (1993–1994)
- Jeff Mason – drums (1994–1996)
- Jim Calvert – drums (2001–2002)
- Mike Reed – drums (2006–2011)
- Jayson Sherlock – drums (2012–2014)

Timeline

== Additional reading ==
- Hale, Mark (1993). "0796". Headbangers (First edition, second printing ed.). Ann Arbor, Michigan: Popular Culture, Ink. p. 92. ISBN 1-56075-029-4.
