= The Collected Works of Tourniquet =

Compilation album by Tourniquet
- Released: July 1, 1996
- Genre: Christian metal, thrash metal
- Length: 1:10:48
- Label: Intense Records
- Producer: Bill Metoyer; Tourniquet

Tourniquet chronology
Carry the Wounded (1995)	The Collected Works of Tourniquet (1996)	Crawl to China (1997)

Professional ratings
Review scores
Source	Rating
Cross Rhythms	10/10 stars

The Collected Works of Tourniquet is the first compilation album by the American Christian metal band Tourniquet. It was released on Intense Records in 1996. The album features fourteen songs: eleven songs are taken directly from the band's previous releases, though "The Skeezix Dilemma" has been edited in that it uses the majority of the studio recording and segues into the live version's ending from Intense Live Series, Vol. 2 (1993), and it introduces two new songs, "Perfect Night for a Hanging" and "The Hand Trembler".

== Track listing ==
No.	Title	Original release (year)	Length
1.	"Perfect Night for a Hanging"	The Collected Works of Tourniquet (1996)	5:04
2.	"Vanishing Lessons"	Vanishing Lessons (1994)	4:18
3.	"Pathogenic Ocular Dissonance"	Pathogenic Ocular Dissonance (1992)	4:26
4.	"Twilight"	Vanishing Lessons (1994)	4:03
5.	"Psycho Surgery"	Psycho Surgery (1991)	4:14
6.	"You Get What You Pray For"	Stop the Bleeding (1990)	3:22
7.	"Acidhead"	Vanishing Lessons (1994)	4:24
8.	"Broken Chromosomes"	Psycho Surgery (1991)	5:20
9.	"Viento Borrascoso (Devastating Wind)"	Psycho Surgery (1991)	3:08
10.	"Carry the Wounded"	Carry the Wounded (1995)	5:02
11.	"Bearing Gruesome Cargo"	Vanishing Lessons (1994)	4:38
12.	"The Skeezix Dilemma"	Pathogenic Ocular Dissonance (1992)	9:58
13.	"Ark of Suffering"	Stop the Bleeding (1990)	4:15
14.	"The Hand Trembler^{[a]}"	The Collected Works of Tourniquet (1996)	8:36
Total length:			1:10:48

^{a} appears on The Epic Tracks (2019)

== Personnel ==
- "Perfect Night for a Hanging" and "The Hand Trembler" produced by Tourniquet and Bill Metoyer
- Mixed by Bill Metoyer
- Recorded and mixed at Mixing Lab A in Huntington Beach, California
- Creative director: Stormy Rodman
- Art direction: Terry DeGraff
- Art and design: Brandy Flower
- Cover illustration: Tim White
- Photography
  - Individual photos: Jim Muth
  - Group photos: Larry Bolen
- Songs digitally remastered by Eddie Schreyer at Future Disc in Hollywood, California
