= Acoustic Archives =

Studio album by Tourniquet
- Released: Late 1998
- Recorded: October 10 – November 4, 1998
- Studios: Bill's Place in North Hollywood, California
- Length: 46:22
- Label: Independent
- Producers: Bill Metoyer; Tourniquet

Tourniquet chronology
Crawl to China (1997)	Acoustic Archives (1998)	Microscopic View of a Telescopic Realm (2000)

Professional ratings
Review scores
Source	Rating
HM Magazine	(highly favorable)
Cross Rhythms	10/10 stars
The Phantom Tollbooth	3.5/5 stars

Acoustic Archives is an acoustic compilation album by the American Christian metal band Tourniquet. It was released in 1998. Nearly all the songs are from previous releases and performed acoustically, with the exception of the new song "Trivializing the Momentous, Complicating the Obvious".

== Track listing ==
No.	Title	Original release (year)	Length
1.	"Viento Borrascoso (Devastating Wind)"	Psycho Surgery (1991)	2:50
2.	"Vanishing Lessons"	Vanishing Lessons (1994)	5:19
3.	"Claustrospelunker"	Crawl to China (1997)	4:04
4.	"Bearing Gruesome Cargo"	Vanishing Lessons (1994)	4:54
5.	"Phantom Limb"	Pathogenic Ocular Dissonance (1992)	5:59
6.	"Bats"	Crawl to China (1997)	3:23
7.	"Heads I Win, Tails You Lose"	Carry the Wounded (1995)	4:12
8.	"Twilight"	Vanishing Lessons (1994)	4:01
9.	"If Pigs Could Fly"	Crawl to China (1997)	5:01
10.	"Trivializing the Momentous, Complicating the Obvious^{[a]}"	–	6:35
Total length:			46:22

^{a} appears on The Epic Tracks (2019)

== Personnel ==
Tourniquet

- Ted Kirkpatrick – drums, percussion
- Luke Easter – vocals
- Aaron Guerra – guitar, vocals
- Vince Dennis – bass guitar, vocals

Additional personnel

- Produced by Bill Metoyer and Tourniquet
- Mastered by Eddy Schreyer at Oasis Mastering in Studio City, California
- Guitar setup and intonation by Eric Chaz
- Original watercolor cover painting by Alison Schroeer
