= Intense Live Series, Vol. 2 =

Live album by Tourniquet
- Released: February 1993
- Recorded: January 9 & 10, 1993
- Genre: Christian metal, thrash metal
- Length: 35:25
- Label: Intense Records
- Producer: Terry Taylor

Tourniquet live chronology
| Intense Live Series, Vol. 2 (1993) | Live in California - 1998 (2010) |

Professional ratings
Review scores
| Source | Rating |
|---|---|
| Allmusic | 2/5 stars |

Intense Live Series, Vol. 2 (also known as Recorded Live, Vol. 2) is the first live album by the American Christian metal band Tourniquet. It was released on Intense Records in February 1993. It contains live recordings of material from the band's previous three studio albums, Stop the Bleeding (1990), Psycho Surgery (1991), and Pathogenic Ocular Dissonance (1992), as well as covers of "The Tempter" from Trouble's Psalm 9 album and "The Messiah" from Bloodgood's Detonation album. Les Carlsen, Bloodgood's vocalist, was a special guest vocalist since Tourniquet vocalist Guy Ritter departed from the band prior to the recording of this album. Victor Macias, Gary Lenaire, and Erik Mendez also perform vocals. Session notes by Terry Taylor, the album's executive producer, and a biography of Tourniquet are included in the booklet. Intense Live Series, Vol. 2 was later included as part of the Intense Live Series compilation, which also contained Vol. 1 by Deliverance and Vol. 4 by Die Happy, and released on KMG Records in 1998.

== Track listing ==
| No. | Title | Original album | Length |
|---|---|---|---|
| 1. | "Phantom Limb" | Pathogenic Ocular Dissonance (1992) | 6:27 |
| 2. | "Medley: Ark of Suffering/Sterotaxic Atrocities" | Stop the Bleeding (1990)/Psycho Surgery (1991) | 5:20 |
| 3. | "(in studio)" | – | 0:17 |
| 4. | "Whitewashed Tomb" | Stop the Bleeding (1990) | 4:21 |
| 5. | "The Skeezix Dilemma" | Pathogenic Ocular Dissonance (1992) | 7:37 |
| 6. | "The Tempter (Trouble cover)^{[a]}" | Psalm 9 (1984) | 6:10 |
| 7. | "(in studio)" | – | 0:22 |
| 8. | "The Messiah (Bloodgood cover)" | Detonation (1987) | 4:51 |
| Total length: | | | 35:25 |

^{a} appears on Pathogenic Ocular Dissonance (Metal Blade Records version (1993) and Collector's Edition remaster (2020))

== Personnel ==
Tourniquet

- Ted Kirkpatrick - drums, percussion
- Gary Lenaire - lead guitar, rhythm guitar, vocals
- Erik Mendez - lead guitar, rhythm guitar, vocals
- Victor Macias - bass guitar, vocals

Guest musician

- Les Carlsen (Bloodgood) - vocals

Additional personnel

- Executive producer: Terry Taylor
- Engineered by Gene Eugene
- Recorded January 9 and 10, 1993 at The Green Room, California
- Mixed January 17 and 18, 1993 at Mixing Lab A, Garden Grove, California
- Mastered by Doug Doyle at Digital Brothers, California
- Art direction: Brian Godawa
- Design: Joe Potter
- A&R direction: Matthew Duffy
