= Uncle Wiggily =

Uncle Wiggily Longears
- First appearance: Uncle Wiggily's Adventures
- Created by: Howard R. Garis

In-universe information
- Species: Rabbit
- Gender: Male

Uncle Wiggily Longears is the main character of a series of children's stories by American author Howard R. Garis. Garis began writing the stories for the Newark News in 1910; he penned an Uncle Wiggily story every day (except Sundays) for more than 52 years, and he published 79 books in his lifetime. According to his obituary in the Chicago Tribune, a walk in the woods in Verona, New Jersey, was his inspiration. The books featured work by several illustrators, notably Lansing Campbell. Other illustrators of the series included George L. Carlson, Louis Wisa, Elmer Rache, Edward Bloomfield, and Mary and Wallace Stover.

Book cover for Uncle Wiggily's Rheumatism

== Characters and stories ==
Uncle Wiggily, an engaging elderly rabbit, is lame from rheumatism. Wherever he goes, he always relies on a red, white, and blue crutch—described as being "striped like a barber-pole", or, in later episodes, "his candy-striped walking cane", with spiral red-and-white striping like a peppermint candy stick.

Uncle Wiggily is only one of many recurring characters in the series. For example, the Pipsisewah is an unsavory bully who appears as a rhinoceros-like creature. His head has a snout with two small horns and large, snorting nostrils; he wears a black, conical cloth hat and patched scarlet trousers, is stout with a giraffe-skin body and bovine tail, and walks upright on two legs. As do the other characters, he has hands, but boar's hooves for feet. He is normally accompanied by the crow-like Skeezicks, in his tall red cap and red-and-yellow-striped suit, and the two of them rarely engage in anything other than mischief harmless to the other characters in the storyline. The Bazumpus, the Crozokus, and the Scuttlemagoon appear less frequently, but are just as outlandish as the aforementioned "Pip" and "Skee", and always require appropriate "handling" by Uncle Wiggily—often with the aid of his animal friends.

There are also several other "bad chaps" in the stories: the Woozy Wolf, Bushy Bear, Skillery Skallery Alligator and the fierce Bobcat, to name but a few. They all seem bent on nibbling the "souse" off Uncle Wiggily's ears, but he always escapes. In shorter, more formulaic stories, his escape is generally enabled by some implement he has just purchased at the store—often while on an errand for his muskrat housekeeper, Nurse Jane Fuzzy Wuzzy. For example, Uncle Wiggily once used an umbrella to foil the Skillery Skallery Alligator by thrusting it into the creature's mouth and opening it, thus preventing his biting the old gentleman rabbit.

Uncle Wiggily also encounters amicable animal characters from his neighborhood, such as Sammie and Susie Littletail (Uncle Wiggily's young nephew and niece), Lulu, Alice, and Jimmie Wibblewobble (duck children), Dr. Possum (local physician), Uncle Butter (goat), Charlie and Arabella Chick, Jackie and Peetie Bow-Wow, Billie and Johnnie Bushytail (squirrel boys), Joie, Tommie, and Kittie Kat, Jennie Chipmunk, Munchie Trot (pony boy), Dottie and Willie Lambkin, Neddie and Beckie Stubtail (friendly bear cubs), as well as many others. In shorter stories, Uncle Wiggily is frequently found helping several of these friends out of some kind of predicament just before one of the bad chaps enters the picture, intent on obtaining "ear-nibbles" from their hapless victims. In longer stories, Uncle Wiggily often is off on a camping trip or other extended journey with one of his friends, fending off repeated incursions or baffling mean-spirited pranks from a lurking villain or two—not uncommonly with the aid of his crutch or a "thing-a-ma-bob" he happens to have brought along in his satchel.

== Selected bibliography ==
Howard Garis published 79 books of Uncle Wiggily stories. A few of these included:

- Uncle Wiggily's Adventures (1912)
- Uncle Wiggily's Travels (copyright 1913)
- Uncle Wiggily's Fortune (copyright 1913)
- Uncle Wiggily's Automobile (copyright 1913)
- Uncle Wiggily's Airship (copyright 1915)
- Uncle Wiggily in the Country (copyright 1916)
- Uncle Wiggily on the Farm (copyright 1918)
- Uncle Wiggily's Empty Watch (copyright 1919) — three short stories
- Uncle Wiggily's Fishing Trip (copyright 1919) — three short stories
- Uncle Wiggily Goes Swimming (copyright 1919) — three short stories
- Uncle Wiggily Indian Hunter (copyright 1919) — three short stories
- Uncle Wiggily's Holidays (copyright 1919) — three short stories
- Uncle Wiggily's Rheumatism (copyright 1920)
- Uncle Wiggily in Fairyland (Uncle Wiggily Arabian Nights) (copyright 1922)
- Uncle Wiggily Book (copyright 1927) — published as a school reading book
- Uncle Wiggily and His Friends (copyright 1939)
- Uncle Wiggily and the Littletails (copyright 1942)
- Uncle Wiggily's Happy Days (copyright 1947)
- Uncle Wiggily and Jackie and Peetie Bow Wow (copyright 1952)
- Uncle Wiggily at the Seashore
- Uncle Wiggily's Story Book
- Uncle Wiggily's Picture Book
- Uncle Wiggily and the Turkey Gobbler — three short stories
- Uncle Wiggily's Water Spout — three short stories

=== Picture books with Lang Cambell ===
Howard Garis published 32 picture books of Uncle Wiggily stories with Lang Cambell. Each contains three stories, the title story and two more:

1. Uncle Wiggily’s Auto Sled
2. Uncle Wiggily’s Snow Man
3. Uncle Wiggily’s Holidays
4. Uncle Wiggily’s Apple Roast
5. Uncle Wiggily’s Picnic
6. Uncle Wiggily’s Fishing Trip
7. Uncle Wiggily’s June Bug Friends
8. Uncle Wiggily’s Visit To The Farm
9. Uncle Wiggily’s Silk Hat
10. Uncle Wiggily, Indian Hunter
11. Uncle Wiggily’s Ice Cream Party
12. Uncle Wiggily’s Woodland Games
13. Uncle Wiggily On The Flying Rug
14. Uncle Wiggily At The Beach
15. Uncle Wiggily And The Pirates
16. Uncle Wiggily’s Funny Auto
17. Uncle Wiggily On Roller Skates
18. Uncle Wiggily Goes Swimming
19. Uncle Wiggily’s Water Spout
20. Uncle Wiggily’s Laughing Gas Balloons
21. Uncle Wiggily’s Empty Watch
22. Uncle Wiggily’s Radio
23. Uncle Wiggily And The Beaver Boys
24. Uncle Wiggily And The Turkey Gobbler
25. Uncle Wiggily’s Squirt Gun (1919)
26. Uncle Wiggily And The Alligator
27. Uncle Wiggily’s Washtub Ship
28. Uncle Wiggily’s Rolling Hoop
29. Uncle Wiggily’s Make Believe Tarts
30. Uncle Wiggily’s Ice Boat
31. Uncle Wiggily’s Jumping Boots
32. Uncle Wiggily’s Icicle Spear

== Board game ==
The Uncle Wiggily Game has been manufactured for more than a century. In 1916 Milton Bradley began selling a board game that has players taking cards that show how far they can move their Uncle Wiggily figurines across the board. The game was modified in 1929, 1947 and 1955. In 1987 Parker Brothers bought the rights to the game and made further changes. As of 2018 Winning Moves was manufacturing the Uncle Wiggily Game.

== In popular culture ==
Uncle Wiggley was the name of a small skateboard company that operated from 1984 to 1990 and was known for using "epoxyglass" in their skateboard manufacturing. In addition to making their own products, they also made skateboards decks for Losi, Blockhead, SGI, Magnusson Designs and Steadham Designs, as well as early H-Street decks. Sponsored professionals included Tony Magnusson (who was a part-owner) and John Schultes.

Uncle Wiggly was a 1990s-era rock band.

Uncle Wiggly's was also the name of a Baltimore-based chain of ice cream shops that was closed in January 2020.

A two-part song regarding Uncle Wiggily is on Tourniquet's albums Pathogenic Ocular Dissonance ("The Skeezix Dilemma") and Microscopic View of a Telescopic Realm ("The Skeezix Dilemma Part II").

The book Uncle Wiggily and His Friends makes a brief appearance in the 1994 film Forrest Gump, being read by Jenny while Forrest "dangles".

On the September 4, 2013 episode of Late Night with Jimmy Fallon, Uncle Wiggly's Rheumatism book was featured on the "Do Not Read List" skit.

Uncle Wiggily appears as a reference between the two characters, Eloise and Walt, in "Uncle Wiggily in Connecticut", one of the nine short stories in J.D. Salinger's collection of short stories, Nine Stories. Specifically, the story's title refers to an event recalled by Eloise in which she and Walt were running to catch a bus and she sprains her ankle. Walt then says, referring to her ankle in good humor, "Poor Uncle Wiggily...".

Likewise, in the movie My Foolish Heart, based on Uncle Wiggily in Connecticut, the two characters bond over childhood memories of Uncle Wiggily when Eloise (Susan Hayward) cuts her finger while washing Walt's (Dana Andrews) dishes. Walt, caring for her injured finger, says "Poor Uncle Wiggily...", referencing the rabbit's ears and then her ears, which ultimately leads to their first kiss.

In 1987, Uncle Wiggily was referred to in a "rock music fable" called "Little Boy Goes to Hell", a four-record set by Mark Nichols, released on PopLlama Records. The song is titled "Your Deepest Fear".

== See also ==
- "Uncle Wiggily in Connecticut", a short story by J.D. Salinger
