= Gazing at Medusa =

Studio album by Tourniquet
- Released: October 16, 2018
- Recorded: Boca Raton, FL
- Genres: Christian metal, thrash metal, progressive metal
- Label: Pathogenic Records
- Producer: Ted Kirkpatrick

Tourniquet chronology
Onward to Freedom (2014)	Gazing at Medusa (2018)	The Epic Tracks (2019)

Singles from Gazing at Medusa
- 1. "Gazing at Medusa" Released: May 22, 2018; 2. "Sinister Scherzo" Released: September 19, 2018

Gazing at Medusa is the tenth and final studio album by Christian metal band Tourniquet. It was produced by Ted Kirkpatrick, and features guests Chris Poland (Megadeth), Tim "Ripper" Owens (Judas Priest, Iced Earth), and Deen Castronovo (Journey, Ozzy Osbourne). On August 19, 2022, Kirkpatrick died from idiopathic pulmonary fibrosis, effectively ending the band.

== Critical reception ==
Professional ratings
Review scores
Source	Rating
HM Magazine	3.5/5 stars
Metal Archives	86%
Metal Gods TV	8/10

HM Magazine quoted, "Gazing At Medusa should be a scorching listen from beginning to end by all rights (looking at the cover and the song titles). No doubt, things start well with 'Sinister Scherzo'—trademark Tourniquet riffs, classical influence, and biting lyrics. Similarly, the closing title track is quite spectacular, those Deen Castronovo vocals are stellar. But solid bookends don’t necessarily make for a great read. Sadly, from a musical standpoint, this is one of the weakest of all the Tourniquet releases. It’s hard to put in words as to why these songs don’t jump out of the speakers and capture my unrelenting attention." Metal Archives said, "This opus shows the guys taking their art seriously once again by restoring the staple Tourniquet style, categorically winning the staring contest with the pernicious Medusa. There are more battles to be fought, that’s for sure, but there’s no fear...it’s comforting to know that most of the stars on the metal show are always ready to lend you a hand/arm/voice if the need arises." Metal Gods said, "the guitar work on this album is superb. Plenty of NWOBHM inspired buzz sounding riffs, as well as the screeching and screaming you more associate with thrash, and of course the long passages synonymous with the progressive genre of metal—Overall, thrash, progressive, NWOBHM and traditional heavy metal all come together, delivering a fierce rage of furious metal."

== Track listing ==
All lyrics are written by Ted Kirkpatrick; all music is composed by Ted Kirkpatrick.

No.	Title	Length
1.	"Sinister Scherzo"	5:51
2.	"Longing for Gondwanaland"	5:47
3.	"Memento Mori"	4:22
4.	"All Good Things Died Here"	4:52
5.	"The Crushing Weight of Eternity"	6:17
6.	"The Peaceful Beauty of Brutal Justice"	5:07
7.	"Can't Make Me Hate You"	4:03
8.	"One Foot in Forever"	5:00
9.	"Gazing at Medusa" (feat. Deen Castronovo)	4:15
Total length:		45:34

== Personnel ==
Tourniquet

- Ted Kirkpatrick – drums, production, bass, additional guitars
- Chris Poland – lead guitar
- Aaron Guerra – guitars, vocals
- Tim "Ripper" Owens – lead vocals

Additional Personnel

- Aaron Pace – mixing and mastering
- Jason Juta – album artwork
- Jonathan Guerra – spoken word ("All Good Things Died Here")
- Deen Castronovo – guest vocals ("Gazing at Medusa")
