= Ark of Suffering =

Single by Tourniquet

from the album Stop the Bleeding
- Released: 1990
- Genre: Technical thrash metal
- Length: 4:14
- Label: Intense
- Songwriter: Ted Kirkpatrick
- Producers: Bill Metoyer and Tourniquet

"Ark of Suffering" is a song by the American thrash metal band Tourniquet. One of the band's best known songs from their early years, "Ark of Suffering" is the third track from Tourniquet's 1990 debut album Stop the Bleeding. It is widely known for its stance on animal abuse and the music video which contained graphic material on the subject. "Ark of Suffering" is still an almost constant part of the band's live set list, frequently as the opening or closing song.

== Overview ==
Written by the band's co-founder and drummer Ted Kirkpatrick, "Ark of Suffering" has a more serious and darker atmosphere compared to rest of the album's songs. It is the only song on the album to feature the guitarist Gary Lenaire sharing his shouting vocals with the melodic ones of Guy Ritter.

"Ark of Suffering" begins with a fast and aggressive, full-on thrash metal intro that lasts 6 seconds, featuring minimalist thrash riffing and d-beat drumming. The music stops for a few seconds, followed by an interlude of just the lead guitar playing, and at 0:19 the drums step in again. The song pauses for a second while the aggressive shouting vocals of Gary Lenaire comes in accompanied by a vocal effect, and the song keeps going with the whole band playing. Lenaire sings: "You think it's alright to destroy God's creation..." At 0:45 the tempo becomes slower, and the melodic baritone vocals of Guy Ritter take place, singing: "Do you think dominate means to kill just for sport..." At 1:14, the tempo becomes faster accompanied by double bass drumming, and Lenaire's shouting vocals replace Ritter again: "Don't you see in their eyes how they trust us..." At 1:36 Ritter's vocals come in for the slower part. At 1:52, Mark Lewis plays a guitar solo, from 2:15 to 2:35 the band plays an aggressive, rhythmic and instrumental interlude, followed by a second virtuosic guitar solo by Mark Lewis, with Lenaire playing the third solo from 2:55. A calmer interlude starts at 3:14, playing a complex riff till 3:30, when Ritter whispers: "Before they die..." Then with a deep baritone voice: "Who will hear their cry." — with "cry" sang with Ritter's high-pitched and twisted falsetto voice. The guitars play 2 atonal riffs around 3:50, creating an oppressive atmosphere, a shredding lead at 4:00, and the songs ends at 4:14.

== Theme ==
"Ark of Suffering" is about man's responsibility for taking care of animals. The song takes a Biblical point of view on the subject, implying how God has given man the right to dominate the creatures in the world, but has to answer for his wrongings for God. The lyrics point out several examples of animal abuse such as canned hunts, raising them to only to be made for fur and leather coats, circus training, taking animals as pets and abandoning them once they are no longer young, laboratory tests, locking in cages in meat houses, and cutting them for educational purposes. According to the liner notes of the album, Ted Kirkpatrick felt strongly about the subject, and has written:

How could I convey my anger and sadness over the horrific world of animal abuse? writing "Ark of Suffering" was a very cathartic experience for me. I know it has opened many people's eyes to a part of our world that very few people get to see, much less want to see.

== Music video ==
A music video that includes the guitarist Erik Mendez and bassist Victor Maciaswas was shot for the song. Mendez is shown playing the leads of the session musician Mark Lewis. The band performs in a studio environment, and Guy Ritter and Gary Lenaire have a slight glam metal look with their eye mascara. Additional video material includes violent footage of hunting, laboratory tests, meat houses and other situations portraying animal abuse. A visual performance art is done by Devino, portraying the agony of the abused animals.

The video received airplay on MTV before it was banned for being too graphic. The video won the Christian News Forum Contemporary Christian Music Award for "Rock Video of the Year" and it was voted by the Heaven's Metal magazine's readers as their "Favorite Video of the Year". The video is also included on the Ocular Digital DVD.

Ritter has said about the song airplay:

They [MTV] did play it ["Ark of Suffering"]. A quite a few times as a matter of fact. We had people like Tom Scholz (Boston) and Paul McCartney and Grace Slick (Jefferson Airplane/Starship) calling MTV saying, “You have got to play this video.” So what was happening was that “Animals Agenda” and some of these other magazines were calling these celebrities that they knew and saying, “We need you to call and get this MTV video on the air.” And that is how it got played. By these stars, who we never got to meet! I can’t take credit for that. (laughter) And there was an interview too, I think in “Animals Agenda” where they interviewed Ted Nugent and then they interviewed us and put us back to back in the same magazine. He talked about slaughtering the animals and then we would come back and say, “don’t slaughter the animals.” I still have that article. It was pretty cool.

== Personnel ==
Tourniquet

- Guy Ritter - Vocals
- Gary Lenaire - Guitars, Vocals
- Ted Kirkpatrick - Drums

Additional Musicians

- Mark Lewis - Lead Guitars
- Erik Jan James - Bass

Production

- Bill Metoyer - Producer

Video

- Erik Mendez - Lead Guitars
- Victor Macias - Bass
- Devino - Firebreathing
