= Carry the Wounded =

EP by Tourniquet
- Released: July 1, 1995
- Genres: Christian metal, Christian rock
- Length: 19:20
- Label: Intense Records
- Producer: Jim Faraci

Tourniquet chronology
Vanishing Lessons (1994)	Carry the Wounded (1995)	The Collected Works of Tourniquet (1996)

Professional ratings
Review scores
Source	Rating
Cross Rhythms	7/10 stars

Carry the Wounded is an extended play by the American Christian metal band Tourniquet. It was released on Intense Records in 1995. The EP is more mellow than the band's studio albums. It contains three new songs, a cover of the 1969 single "Oh Well" by Fleetwood Mac, and a new version of "My Promise" from Tourniquet's 1994 album Vanishing Lessons.

== Track listing ==
No.	Title	Length
1.	"Carry the Wounded^{[a]}"	5:00
2.	"When the Love is Right"	4:40
3.	"Oh Well" (Fleetwood Mac cover)	2:33
4.	"My Promise"	3:17
5.	"Heads I Win, Tails You Lose^{[b]}"	3:50
Total length:		19:20

^{a} appears on The Collected Works of Tourniquet (1996)
^{b} acoustic version appears on Acoustic Archives (1998)

== Personnel ==
Tourniquet

- Ted Kirkpatrick - drums, percussion, guitar, background vocals
- Gary Lenaire - guitar
- Victor Macias - bass guitar
- Luke Easter - vocals, background vocals
- Aaron Guerra - guitar

Additional musicians

- Jim Cox - piano/keys ("When the Love is Right")
- Paul McIntire - violin ("My Promise")
- Rick Rekedal - cello ("My Promise")

Additional personnel

- Produced by Jim Faraci
- Engineered by Jim Faraci
- Second engineer: Steve Good
- Mixed by Jim Faraci and Charlie Brocco
- Mastered by Chris Bellman at Bernie Grundman's
- A&R: Matthew Duffy
- Photography: David Dobson
- Art direction: Thom Roy/Matthew Duffy
- Composites and design: Jack Wedell and Megan Giles
