= Gary Lenaire =

American musician (born 1967)

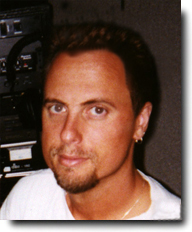

Background information
- Born: July 29, 1967 (age 59)
- Origin: United States
- Genres: thrash metal; Christian metal; speed metal
- Occupation: Musician
- Instruments: Vocals, guitar
- Years active: 1985-present

Gary Lenaire (born July 29, 1967) is an American musician who primarily performs thrash metal and speed metal. Lenaire is best known for his work in Tourniquet, though later he began to work for BOSS amps and interviewed musicians, including Steve Vai, Marty Friedman, John 5, and Rudy Sarzo. Lenaire was nominated for six GMA Awards, and received Heaven's Metal Magazine's "guitarist of the year" award between 1994 and 1996.

== History ==
Lenaire began performing music prior to 1985, performing with Guy Ritter. The two went on to start Holy Danger, a Christian heavy metal band which lasted a year, though the band recorded a full-length titled One Way. In 1989, Lenaire and Ritter formed a new band called Tourniquet, hiring on former Trouble drummer Ted Kirkpatrick. The band released their first album, Stop the Bleeding, through Intense Records, with the album being produced by Bill Metoyer (Slayer, Cattle Decapitation). The three hired on Erik Mendez on guitars and Victor Macias on bass and the band would then perform as a five-piece. Over the years, Lenaire recorded on the records Psychosurgery, Pathogenic Ocular Dissonance, Vanishing Lessons, Carry the Wounded EP, and Collected Works

In 1996, Lenaire departed from Tourniquet. According to Mendez, he believed that Lenaire had a falling out with Kirkpatrick, as well as vocalist-at-the-time Luke Easter, which led to his departure. Lenaire went on to form Echo Hollow alongside Ritter. With Echo Hollow, Lenaire recorded on both albums, titled Diet of Worms and Superficial Intelligence. In 2004, Echo Hollow disbanded, with Lenaire going to form Cripple Need Cane. In 2005, with Cripple Need Cane, Lenaire recorded and released The Big Dance. In 2006, Lenaire reconnected with his former Tourniquet bandmates Mendez and Macias, repairing any bad blood there was between them, and created the project known as 2050. The band, while never having released a full-length album, have recorded two songs, including "Darfur" and "In Remission". A long gap between his musical career occurred, however, this allowed Lenaire to write a book, titled Infidel Manifesto: Why Sincere Believers Lose Faith, which documents Lenaire's leaving of the Christian faith. According to his bandmate, Mendez, Lenaire is agnostic and is "still searching". In 2017, he recorded his debut solo release, titled No Time Now, which featured Bubby Lewis (Snoop Dogg, Suicidal Tendencies), Anna Sentina, Neil Swanson (Ritchie Sambora and Orianthi), Aly Frank, Andrijana Janevska, and Ritter. Lenaire later released a single with Easter on vocals. In early 2020, Lenaire released his second solo release, which was titled Symphonic Liberties, which saw a departure from the typical metal releases Lenaire was known for, moving into classical music territories. Later on that year, Lenaire announced a third solo album, which featured his former bandmates, Ritter, Easter, and Mendez - with hopes that Macias would return - to record a thrash metal album similar to Tourniquet. Lenaire also hired David Husvik of Extol, Azusa, and Mantric fame to record drums for the album. The band would later announce their name as FLOOD, with the assistance of Michael Sweet of Stryper. The full lineup consists of Lenaire on guitars and vocals, Guy Ritter on vocals, Erik Mendez on guitars, David Husvik on drums, and Anna Sentina on bass. FLOOD is Lenaire's comeback to Christian heavy metal as after being away from the Christian religion for over two decades he became a Christian again in 2021.

== Bands ==
Current

- 2050 - guitars, vocals (2006-2007)
- Gary Lenaire - vocals, guitar, bass (2004, 2017–present)
- FLOOD - guitars, vocals (2020–present)

Former

- Holy Danger - guitars (1985-1986)
- Tourniquet - guitars, vocals (1989-1996), bass (1989-1991)
- Echo Hollow - guitars, vocals (1996-2004)
- Cripple Need Cane - vocals, guitars, bass, synth (2004-2006)
- Talking Snakes - vocals

== Discography ==
Holy Danger

- One Way (1986)

Tourniquet

- Stop the Bleeding (1990)
- Psycho Surgery (1991)
- Pathogenic Ocular Dissonance (1992)
- Intense Live Series, Vol. 2 (1993)
- Vanishing Lessons (1994)
- Carry the Wounded (1995)
- Collected Works (1996)

Echo Hollow

- Diet of Worms (1998)
- Superficial Intelligence (2004)

Cripple Need Cane

- The Big Dance (2005)

Solo

- The Lost Years (2004)
- No Time Now (2017)
- Symphonic Liberties (2020)

FLOOD

- Polarized (2022)
- Ripped into Exile (2024)

== Bibliography ==
- An Infidel Manifesto: Why Sincere Believers Lose Faith (2006)
