= Psycho Surgery =

Studio album by Tourniquet
- Released: July 1, 1991
- Studio: Mixing Lab A & B in Garden Grove, California
- Genre: Christian metal, thrash metal
- Length: 40:53 (1991); 63:27 (2001); 58:50 (2020)
- Label: Intense Records
- Producer: Bill Metoyer; Tourniquet

Tourniquet chronology
Stop the Bleeding (1990)	Psycho Surgery (1991)	Pathogenic Ocular Dissonance (1992)

2001 cover

Psycho Surgery is the second studio album by the American Christian metal band Tourniquet. It was originally released on Intense Records and Metal Blade Records in 1991. A remastered version was released on Pathogenic Records in 2001 as Psychosurgery and includes revised artwork, an expanded album booklet, and bonus tracks that include live versions of songs featuring then-lead vocalist Luke Easter as well as demos; the title was changed since co-founder and drummer Ted Kirkpatrick always felt that it should have been just one. Retroactive Records released a Collector's Edition remaster on June 26, 2020, retaining the original album title and including an extended booklet as well as different bonus tracks. Considered by critics to be Tourniquet's most balanced of the band's first three albums, Heaven's Metal fanzine ranked Psycho Surgery Christian metal's second-best album of all time (after Vengeance Rising's 1988 debut album Human Sacrifice).

== Recording history ==
Produced by Metal Blade Records' Bill Metoyer, Tourniquet recorded Psycho Surgery at Mixing Lab A & B studio in Garden Grove, California. Guitarist Erik Mendez and the bassist Victor Macias joined Tourniquet for this album, forming the quintet known as Tourniquet's classic line-up. After the release of Stop the Bleeding in 1990, the band caught Metal Blade Records' attention. Metal Blade Records released Psycho Surgery to the secular market, leaving the Christian market to original label Intense Records. The album cover is a reference to Romans 12:2.

Psycho Surgery represented a more modern, experimental, and technical thrash-metal style, leaving behind the previous album's speed metal elements and incorporating classical music-influenced guitar riffs, complex tempo changes, and virtuosic guitar solos. One reviewer described the album as "Slayer plays Beethoven in a slightly rearranged way." Vocalist Guy Ritter also abandoned his King Diamond-like high-pitched falsetto in favor of a more melodic baritone register.

The album's crisp production creates a somewhat clinical and sterile atmosphere that serves to undergird the album's medical themes. Using his pharmaceutical background, drummer Ted Kirkpatrick infused the lyrics with medical terminology to serve as metaphors for particular social issues such as heretical sects ("A Dog's Breakfast") which also included a jab at three teachers in the Word of Faith Movement (Kenneth Copeland, Benny Hinn, and Kenneth Hagin), discrimination of the developmentally delayed ("Broken Chromosomes"), and parental neglect ("Dysfunctional Domicile"). The song "Stereotaxic Atrocities," a sequel to the previous album's "Ark of Suffering," features a brief reprise of the original's signature guitar riff and criticizes laboratory testing of animals. A re-recorded version of "Stereotaxic Atrocities" appeared on the album Onward to Freedom in 2014 and featured Marty Friedman of Megadeth on guitar and Luke Easter on vocals, with an instrumental version later appearing on Onward to Freedom: Voiceless in 2016.

Taking advantage of rap metal's new popularity, the album's popular song "Spineless" featured the vocal and sampling contributions of Christian hip-hop group P.I.D.. Although Kirkpatrick wrote most of the song's lyrics prior to entering the studio, P.I.D.'s Fred "Doug Tray" Lynch and Barry "G" Hogan crafted their own lyrical contributions on the spot. The fast-moving instrumental "Viento Borrascoso (Devastating Wind)" features Kirkpatrick's virtuosic drumming. The album's final song, "Officium Defunctorum," is a doom metal piece written by guitarist/vocalist Gary Lenaire that addresses Jesus Christ's crucifixion.

== Reception ==
Professional ratings
Review scores
Source	Rating
Chicago Tribune	1.5/4 stars
Cross Rhythms	10/10 stars
Imperiumi.net	(Classic status)
Powermetal.de	(Classic status)
Powermetal.de (Review of re-release)	(Highly favorable)

Metal Blade Records' wide distribution of Psycho Surgery increased Tourniquet's exposure and popularity. Following the album's release, the songs "Psycho Surgery," "Spineless," and "Viento Borrascoso" all achieved number-one positions on several charts, and readers of HM Magazine voted Psycho Surgery their "Favorite Album of the Year" in 1991. In 1992, Psycho Surgery also achieved two GMA Dove Award nominations in the categories Metal Album of the Year and Metal Recorded Song of the Year ("Psycho Surgery"). Critics consider the album a display of talented musicianship, intelligent lyrics, and originality. In August 2010, HM Magazine ranked Psycho Surgery #18 on its list of Top 100 Christian Rock Albums of All Time and the #2 album on its list of Top 100 Christian Metal Albums of All Time. In an interview with Noisecreep about the list, HM Magazine editor Doug Van Pelt explained that Psycho Surgery "found this band playing as a five-member band for the first time and they really bent creativity in metal in new directions that have still not been matched. Nobody has ever sounded like this band. I mean, Between the Buried and Me and maybe System of a Down are the closest in stretching creative boundaries. You almost had to pull out a medical dictionary to understand their [Tourniquet's] lyrics. Standout song would have to be the epic 'Broken Chromosomes,' which is a touching song about mistreated kids that are mentally handicapped. Chilling song."

== Track listing ==
No.	Title	Lyrics	Music	Length
1.	"Psycho Surgery"	Ted Kirkpatrick	Kirkpatrick	4:13
2.	"A Dog's Breakfast"	Guy Ritter	Gary Lenaire	4:27
3.	"Viento Borrascoso (Devastating Wind)" (Instrumental)		Kirkpatrick	3:05
4.	"Vitals Fading"	Kirkpatrick	Kirkpatrick	2:46
5.	"Spineless" (featuring P.I.D.)	Kirkpatrick; Fred Lynch; Barry Hogan	Kirkpatrick	5:11
6.	"Dysfunctional Domicile"	Lenaire	Lenaire	5:02
7.	"Broken Chromosomes"	Ritter	Ritter	5:21
8.	"Stereotaxic Atrocities"	Kirkpatrick	Kirkpatrick	4:22
9.	"Officium Defunctorum"	Lenaire	Lenaire; Kirkpatrick	6:26
Total length:				40:53

2001 remaster exclusive bonus tracks
No.	Title	Length
10.	"A Dog's Breakfast (Live 2000)"	5:34
11.	"Broken Chromosomes (Live 2000)"	6:56
12.	"Stereotaxic Atrocities (Demo 1991)"	4:27
13.	"A Dog's Breakfast (Demo 1991)"	4:38
14.	"Concert Intro (Live 2000)"	0:59
Total length:		63:27

2020 remaster exclusive bonus tracks
No.	Title	Length
10.	"Psycho Surgery (Demo)"	3:54
11.	"Vitals Fading (Demo)"	2:37
12.	"Broken Chromosomes (Live 1992)"	6:34
13.	"Spineless (Live 1992)"	4:52
Total length:		58:50

== Personnel ==
Tourniquet

- Guy Ritter – lead vocals, keyboards
- Gary Lenaire – lead and rhythm guitars, vocals
- Erik Mendez – lead and rhythm guitars
- Victor Macias – bass
- Ted Kirkpatrick – drums, additional rhythm and acoustic guitars

Additional musicians

- Barry Hogan – additional vocals on "Spineless"
- Fred Lynch – additional vocals on "Spineless"
- K-Mack – turntables on "Spineless"

Demo recordings

- Guy Ritter – lead vocals
- Ted Kirkpatrick – drums, all rhythm guitars on "Stereotaxic Atrocities"
- Gary Lenaire – guitars, all rhythm guitars on "A Dog's Breakfast," lead guitar on "Stereotaxic Atrocities"

Live recordings (2001 remaster)

- Ted Kirkpatrick – drums
- Luke Easter – lead vocals
- Aaron Guerra – guitars, vocals, mixing and arranging on "Concert Intro 2000"
- Steve Andino – bass guitar

Production

- Tourniquet – producer
- Bill Metoyer – producer, mixing, engineer
- Guy Ritter – engineer
- Pre–production at Downtown Rehearsal and Eagle Rock Studios
- Mixed at Mixing Lab A in Garden Grove, California

Additional personnel

- George Bryson – theological review
- Jim Martin, Tourniquet – logo concept
- Ed McTaggart – art direction
- Jim Muth – photography
- Ken Taufer – illustration
- Joe Potter – layout (1991 version)
- Brian J. Ames – layout (2001 version)
- William Cooke – remastering at Raven Mastering in Chatsworth, California (2001 version)
- Rob Colwell, Mark Fields – remastering at Bombworks Sound in McKinney, Texas (2020 version)
- Scott Waters (Ultimatum) – design, layout (2020 version)
- Ted Kirkpatrick – liner notes (2020 version)
