= Echo Hollow =

American metal band

- Origin: Burbank, California, U.S.
- Genres: Christian metal Progressive metal
- Years active: 1996–2004
- Label: Geneva Records
- Spinoff of: Tourniquet
- Past members: Guy Ritter; Gary Lenaire; Matt Rosenblum; Matthew Fallentine; Rafik Oganyan

Echo Hollow was an American Christian metal band founded by former Tourniquet members Guy Ritter and Gary Lenaire in 1996. Echo Hollow released two studio albums, Diet of Worms in 1998 and Superficial Intelligence in 2004.

== Background ==
The band formed in October 1996, with Guy Ritter and Gary Lenaire. Matthew Fallentine, who would eventually become Ritter's brother-in-law, on Bass and Matt Rosenblum on Drums. The band made the cover of HM Magazine in 1999 for their first release. The album's title, Diet of Worms, celebrates the actual Diet of Worms, where Martin Luther was excommunicated from the Roman Catholic Church for his work translating the Bible into common German. Another theme was the 1998 shooting at Thurston High School in Springfield, Oregon, from which both Ritter and Lenaire had graduated. Musically, the album was similar to Tourniquet, but less heavy and aggressive.

In 2001, the band added a new guitarist, named Rafik Oganyan on Rhythm Guitars. With Oganyan's addition, the band recorded a new album. By this point, the band was independent; Geneva Records disappeared, with Diet of Worms being the only documented release.

== Discography ==
Studio albums

- Diet of Worms (1998)
- Superficial Intelligence (2004)

== Members ==
Last known lineup

- Guy Ritter – Vocals (ex-Tourniquet, ex-Holy Danger) (1996–2004)
- Gary Lenaire – Guitar (ex-Tourniquet) (1996–2004)
- Matthew Fallentine – Bass (1996–2004)
- Matt Rosenblum – Drums (1996–2004)
- Rafik Oganyan – Guitar (ex-Efusion) (June 2001–2004)

== See also ==
- Tourniquet
- Cripple Need Cane
