= Crawl to China =

Studio album by Tourniquet
- Released: July 1, 1997
- Recorded: February 21, 1997–April 10, 1997
- Studio: Bill's Place in North Hollywood, California
- Genres: Christian metal, Christian rock
- Length: 68:04 (1997); 74:05 (2009)
- Labels: Benson Records (1997); Pathogenic Records (2009)
- Producers: Bill Metoyer; Tourniquet

Tourniquet chronology
The Collected Works of Tourniquet (1996)	Crawl to China (1997)	Acoustic Archives (1998)

Professional ratings
Review scores
Source	Rating
Cross Rhythms	10/10 stars
The Phantom Tollbooth	Review 1: Review 2:

Crawl to China is the fifth studio album by the American Christian metal band Tourniquet. It was initially released on Benson Records in 1997. This album took the band's music style to a more simplistic rock sound. The song "Claustrospelunker" includes bass guitarist Tim Gaines of the American Christian metal band Stryper. The lyrics of the song "The Tell-Tale Heart" are based on Edgar Allan Poe's 1843 short story of the same name. Crawl to China was later remastered by Bill Metoyer and released on Pathogenic Records in 2009; an instrumental version of "If I Was There" was included as a bonus track, the track listing was reordered, new album artwork was made by Rex Zachary, and a new booklet layout was designed with new band photos, lyric commentary, and musical notes. A music video for the title track was released in 1997.

Ted Kirkpatrick, Tourniquet's drummer, said during an interview in 2003 that the band themselves consider the album one of their favorites, although fans and critics were divisive about it when it was first released. He also said that afterwards many of the fans have begun to appreciate Crawl to China, though "the Europeans do not really seem to care for the album".

== Track listing ==
All lyrics are written by Ted Kirkpatrick unless otherwise noted; all music is composed by Ted Kirkpatrick unless otherwise noted.

1997 original version
No.	Title	Lyrics	Music	Length
1.	"Claustrospelunker^{[a]}"			4:19
2.	"Crawl to China"			4:28
3.	"Enveloped in Python"			3:59
4.	"White Knucklin' the Rosary"			4:10
5.	"If I Was There"			5:56
6.	"The Tell-Tale Heart"	Luke Easter	Aaron Guerra	5:14
7.	"Bats^{[a]}"			3:56
8.	"Proprioception: The Line Knives Syndrome"			4:59
9.	"Tire Kicking"			3:44
10.	"If Pigs Could Fly^{[a]}"			4:37
11.	"Crank the Knife"	Easter	Guerra	4:16
12.	"Stumblefoot"			3:40
13.	"Imaginary Friend"	Easter	Guerra	3:56
14.	"Going, Going... Gone^{[b]}"			6:04
15.	"America" (Instrumental)			4:39
Total length:				68:04

^{a} acoustic version appears on Acoustic Archives (1998)
^{b} appears on The Slow Cosmic Voyage to Wisdom (2020)

2009 remastered version
No.	Title	Length
1.	"White Knucklin' the Rosary"	4:11
2.	"Going, Going... Gone"	6:05
3.	"Proprioception: The Line Knives Syndrome"	4:59
4.	"Crawl to China"	4:29
5.	"If I Was There"	5:55
6.	"Tire Kicking"	3:44
7.	"If Pigs Could Fly"	4:37
8.	"Stumblefoot"	3:40
9.	"Enveloped in Python"	4:00
10.	"The Tell-Tale Heart"	3:57
11.	"Bats"	3:57
12.	"Crank the Knife"	4:15
13.	"Claustrospelunker"	4:20
14.	"Imaginary Friend"	3:57
15.	"America" (Instrumental)	4:39
16.	"If I Was There (Instrumental)"	5:56
Total length:		74:05

== Personnel ==
Tourniquet

- Luke Easter - vocals
- Aaron Guerra - guitars, vocals, bass guitar
- Ted Kirkpatrick - drums, guitars, bass guitar

Guest musician

- Tim Gaines - bass guitar on "Claustrospelunker"

Additional personnel

- Produced by Bill Metoyer and Tourniquet
- Mixed by Bill Metoyer
- Mastered by Kevin Szymanski
- Executive producer: George King
- Photography: Robert Ascroft
- Mastered at SkyLab Studios in Nashville, Tennessee
- Recorded and mixed at Bill's Place in North Hollywood, California
- Art direction and designs: Mike Rapp (1997 version)
- Artwork by Rex Zachary (2009 version)
