= Bloodgood =

American Christian metal band

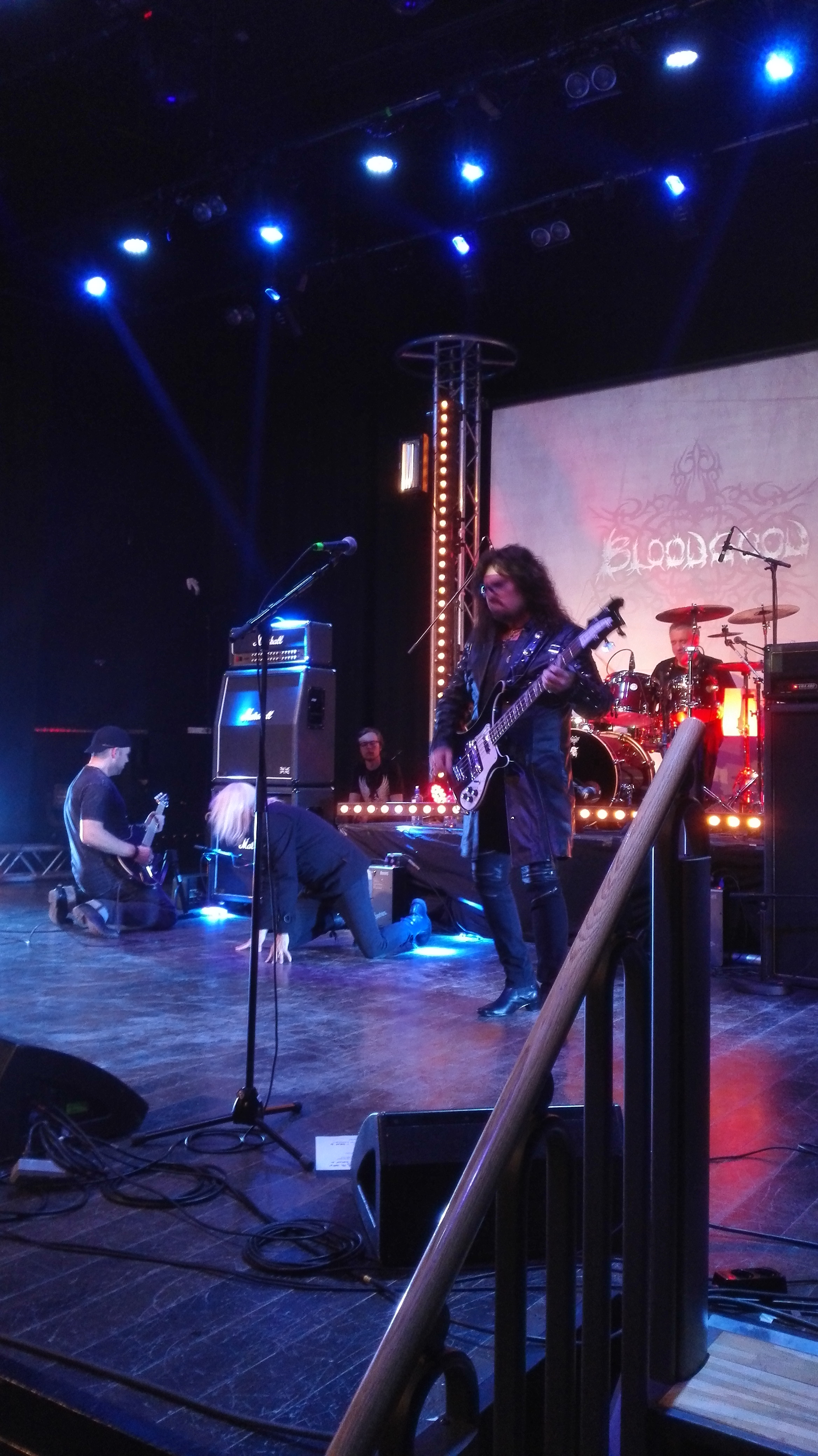
- Bloodgood live at Rainbow Rock Festival 2017

Background information
- Origin: Seattle, Washington, U.S.
- Genres: Christian metal, hard rock
- Years active: 1983–1994, 2006–2022
- Past members: Michael Bloodgood; J.T. Taylor; Les Carlsen; David Zaffiro; Paul Jackson; Craig Church; Tim Heintz; Oz Fox; David Huff; David McKay; Paul Roraback; Kent Walstead; Mark Welling; Kevin Whisler
- Website: bloodgoodband.com

Bloodgood was an American Christian metal band that formed in Seattle, Washington, in 1983. By 1988, Bloodgood represented one of the four largest Christian metal bands (excluding the mainstream success of Stryper) alongside Barren Cross, Leviticus, and Whitecross.

Bloodgood became known for their "go-for-broke attitude about showmanship", displaying attitudes and imagery that brought them into collision with some on the extreme Christian right. In a 1998 retrospective, Christian music critic Brian Quincy Newcomb would write that "Bloodgood's ministry and music was a vital stepping stone in the maturing process of Christian rock."

== Background ==
The band formed around the leadership of Les Carlsen and Michael Bloodgood, who had been active in the local music scene in Seattle for some time. Directly prior to the formation of Bloodgood, Michael had been involved in a local effort, what he later described as "basic straight-ahead rock." That effort had disbanded by mid-1984 as Michael Bloodgood felt called to build a Christian metal band. The Seattle area at that time was known for metal bands such as TKO, Queensrÿche, and Metal Church, but Bloodgood felt a need to represent Christ to that audience, and the band was the natural way to do so.

In 1985, Bloodgood released a demo, Metal Missionaries, of which they sold over 5,000 copies at concerts. Their 1986 eponymous debut was produced by Darrell Mansfield. While Bloodgood was visually similar to other metal bands at the time, it was distinguished by three elements: the vocals of Les Carlsen, the songwriting of Michael Bloodgood, and the guitar techniques of David Zaffiro. The band's sound was in many ways typical of competent 1980s glam metal bands, but their lyrics were distinctly Christian. Themes often included Armageddon, hope and victory in Christ, and the Grace of living in God, with Biblical language throughout. When asked about the influence of Stryper upon the band, Michael Bloodgood told an interviewer that the band had formed before Stryper became well known, and so they were not a musical influence because they played different styles of metal.

Their first major United States tour was in 1987 and was protested by groups on the extreme Christian right. The band was more popular in Europe than in the United States and they toured the United Kingdom in 1988. This tour featured lead vocalist Les Carlsen portraying Pontius Pilate during the song "Crucify", as well as a graphic, live-action portrayal of Christ being crucified. The band's position on theatrics, as summed up by Carlsen: "Heavy metal lends itself to visuals and drama... They come naturally from the music we write."

== Present ==
After five studio albums and three live releases, the group officially disbanded in 1994. The group reformed in 2006 and performed several times a year in the U.S. and Europe until 2022 working with Oz Fox from Stryper in the newly formed lineup. Michael Bloodgood, the group's bass player and namesake, also released a worship solo album, The Cross Changes Everything, in early 2008, under the name "Michael Bloodgood and Friends", featuring the guest talents of other musicians, including bandmates Les Carlsen, Oz Fox, Paul Jackson, Mark Welling, and Michael's son, Paul Michael Bloodgood on drums and vocals.

Bloodgood was a 2010 Inductee into the Christian Music Hall of Fame.

In 2010, HM Magazine listed Detonation No. 23 on its Top 100 Christian Rock Albums of All Time list stating that it has "quite an original metal sound". It singles-out "Crucify", "Messiah", "Self-Destruction" and the ballad "Alone in Suicide". Heaven's Metal fanzine ranked it No. 8 on its Top 100 Christian metal albums of all-time list.

Michael Bloodgood was senior pastor of Calvary Chapel Redmond, Washington. where guest artists such as long time friend and lead singer, Les Carlsen came and performed, other artists such as Randy Stonehill, Buck Storm and Darrell Mansfield have also made appearances at CCR in Redmond, Washington.

Les Carlsen was the lead in the Broadway musical Hair. He performed as a guest vocalist with the American Christian metal band Tourniquet on Intense Live Series, Vol. 2 in 1993. Kevin Whisler was in a Tacoma-based Christian pop-metal band called "Watchmen" before joining Bloodgood. Watchmen released two albums: Fear No Evil in 1988 and Generation in 1990, both on Regency Records.

A full-length documentary, Trenches of Rock is currently touring the film festival circuit. Produced by Bloodygood Pictures, the film features exclusive interviews, music and photos, and all of the controversy surrounding the band. Executive producer is James Moll. The official trailer was released in March 2017. A soundtrack is under way to coincide with the documentary's release in late 2017. On October 19, 2013, Bloodgood released the first video, Lamb of God, from Dangerously Close.

On July 29, 2022, it was announced on their official Facebook page that Michael Bloodgood had died due to complications of a hemorrhagic stroke he suffered in February 2022. Two days later, Bloodgood announced its disbanding.

== Members ==
Former

- Les Carlsen – lead vocals (1984–1994, 2002–2022)
- Michael Bloodgood – bass (1984–1994, 2002–2022; his death)
- J.T. Taylor – drums (1984–1986)
- David Zaffiro – guitar (1984–1988)
- Mark Welling – drums (1986–1989, 1993–1994, 2006–2013)
- Paul Jackson – guitar (1989–1994, 2002–2022)
- Kevin Whisler – drums (1989–1991, 2013–2021; his death)
- David McKay – keyboards (1991–1994, 2002–2007)
- Paul Roraback – drums (1991–1993)
- Tim Heintz – keyboards (1991)
- David Huff – drums (1991)
- Jeffrey McCormack – drums (2002–2006)
- Oz Fox – guitar (2007–2022)

Touring

- Craig Church – rhythm guitar (1990)
- Michael Feighan – drums (2021–2022)
- Kent Walstead – guitar (1992)

Timeline

== Discography ==
=== Studio albums ===
- Bloodgood (1986, Frontline Records)
- Detonation (1987, Frontline Records)
- Rock In a Hard Place (1988, Frontline)
- Out of the Darkness (1989, Intense Records)
- All Stand Together (1991, Broken Records)
- Dangerously Close (2013, B. Goode Records)
- Trenches of Rock Movie Soundtrack (2019, Bloodygood Pictures/B. Goode Records)

=== Live/video albums ===
- Alive In America: Live Volume One (1990, Intense Records)
- Shakin' the World: Live Volume Two (1990, Intense Records)
- Alive in America: Live Volume One (1990, Intense Records, VHS)
- Shakin' the World: Live Volume Two (1990, Intense Records VHS)
- To Germany With Love! (1993; Stephans-Buchhandlung)
- Bloodgood: Live in Norway (2009, DVD of the band's performance at the SeaSide Festival in Norway, 2009)
- Bloodgood Rock Theater (2002, DVD re-issue of Alive in America and Shakin' the World)

=== Compilation appearances ===
- Hot Metal Summer (1988, Benson Records)
- Hot Metal Summer II (1989, Frontline Records)

=== Compilation ===
- The Collection (1991, Intense Records)
- Metal Missionaries 25th Anniversary Edition (2010, B. Goode Records)

=== Demo ===
- Metal Missionaries (1985, self released)

== See also ==
- List of Christian metal artists
- List of glam metal bands and artists
