= Where Moth and Rust Destroy =

Studio album by Tourniquet
- Released: 2003
- Recorded: September – October 2002 in Wisconsin
- Genres: Christian metal, thrash metal, progressive metal
- Length: 59:13
- Label: Metal Blade Records
- Producers: Bill Metoyer; Ted Kirkpatrick

Tourniquet chronology
Microscopic View of a Telescopic Realm (2000)	Where Moth and Rust Destroy (2003)	Antiseptic Bloodbath (2012)

Professional ratings
Review scores
Source	Rating
HM Magazine	(favorable)
Lords of Metal	85/100
Matt Morrow	9/10 stars
The Phantom Tollbooth	4/5 stars
Imperiumi.net	8/10 stars
Powermetal.de	(Highly favorable)

Where Moth and Rust Destroy is the seventh studio album by the American Christian metal band Tourniquet. It was released on Metal Blade Records in 2003. The album's title is a reference to Matthew 6:19. Most of the guitar solos on this album were performed by former Megadeth guitarist Marty Friedman except for the tracks "A Ghost at the Wheel" and "Convoluted Absolutes", which were performed by Trouble guitarist Bruce Franklin.

== Track listing ==
All lyrics are written by Ted Kirkpatrick unless otherwise noted; all music is composed by Kirkpatrick.

No.	Title	Lyrics	Length
1.	"Where Moth and Rust Destroy"		7:15
2.	"Restoring the Locust Years"		3:31
3.	"Drawn and Quartered"		8:11
4.	"A Ghost at the Wheel"	Luke Easter	4:18
5.	"Architeuthis"		6:51
6.	"Melting the Golden Calf"		6:53
7.	"Convoluted Absolutes"	Easter	5:37
8.	"Healing Waters of the Tigris^{[a]}"		9:31
9.	"In Death We Rise"		7:02
Total length:			59:13

^{a} appears on The Epic Tracks (2019)

== Personnel ==
Tourniquet

- Ted Kirkpatrick - drums, rhythm guitars, dulcimer, 8 string bazouki, bass (uncredited)
- Luke Easter - lead vocals
- Steve Andino - bass (credited but did not perform)

Guest musicians

- Marty Friedman - lead guitar on all tracks but "A Ghost At The Wheel" and "Convoluted Absolutes"
- Bruce Franklin - lead guitar on "A Ghost At The Wheel" and "Convoluted Absolutes"
- Dave Bullock - violin ("Architeuthis," "Drawn and Quartered," and "In Death We Rise")

Additional personnel

- Mixed, produced, and recorded by Bill Metoyer for Skull Seven Productions
- Co-produced by Ted Kirkpatrick
- Photography: Jim Muth
- Artwork: Brian J. Ames
