= Anna Sentina =

American musician, multi-instrumentalist (born 1994)

- Born: Anna Sentina; September 16, 1994 (age 31)
- Origin: San Diego, California, U.S.
- Genres: Rock, heavy metal, hard rock, funk
- Occupations: Musician, guitarist
- Instruments: Guitar, bass, piano
- Years active: 2010–present
- Member of: Tourniquet
- Formerly of: Flood

Anna Sentina (born September 16, 1994) is an American musician, multi-instrumentalist, best known for her work as a session bass guitarist, live performer and YouTube celebrity. She has performed around the U.S. at venues such as the Whisky a Go Go, the Viper Room, the Mint, SOMA San Diego, the Hard Rock Cafe and the House of Blues. In 2012, Sentina started a YouTube music channel that by October 2015 had over 21 million views and by July 2021 had over 55 million views.

== Life ==
Anna Sentina is from San Diego, California and is of Italian, Spanish, and Venezuelan descent. She began her study of music at the age of 8, when she was classically trained in piano. At the age of 12, she started studying the guitar at School of Rock in Vista, California, and at 15 took up the bass.

At 14, Sentina went on her first United States tour with the School of Rock All-Stars, where students from each School of Rock in the United States are hand chosen to form a band and tour. She was chosen to tour with the All-Stars again at 15.

In 2009, Sentina performed at the 40th Anniversary of Woodstock reunion in San Diego, California where she performed several songs played at 1969 Woodstock, as well as a solo performance of Jimi Hendrix's "Star-Spangled Banner".

After parting ways with the School of Rock at 16, Sentina formed a metal band with her twin brother, Ricky Sentina, where they performed several shows in the Southern California area.

In 2011, Sentina joined the Summer Shot program at Musicians Institute in Los Angeles, California, where she further studied bass and live performance. She also landed a role in the live musical Fame as "Lambchops."

In 2012, Sentina started her YouTube channel, posting several cover videos on guitar, bass, and piano of popular metal and rock songs and becoming a YouTube Partner at the age of 19 in 2014.

Also in 2014, Sentina formally enrolled in the Musicians Institute and joined the bass program. She began work as a demo musician, creating several demonstration videos of amps, pedals, and instruments and performing live at the NAMM Show and Bass Player magazine's event Bass Player Live for her various endorsers. The videos have been featured on sites and magazines like Guitar World and Bass Musician world Sentina is one of Roland's featured guitar artists, alongside other musicians such as Marty Friedman (ex-Megadeth) and Gus G (Ozzy Osbourne).

In February 2015, Sentina was a part of Converse's Rubber Tracks Sample Library, recording several hours' worth of loops available for free use by musicians globally. Later on in 2015, Esquire magazine named Sentina "A Badass Musician We Love on Instagram."

In November 2015, Sentina's cover of "Seinfeld Theme Song" was posted by the online version of Sports Illustrated.

Sentina was involved in projects with America's Got Talent finalists Emil and Dariel and Candlebox's Kevin Martin.

Sentina was involved in a heavy metal band called FLOOD, featuring former Tourniquet members guitarists Gary Lenaire and Erik Mendez and vocalist Guy Ritter, as well as Extol drummer David Husvik. Since 2025, she is a member of the re-formed version of Tourniquet with Gary Lenaire and Luke Easter.

== Gear ==
=== Instruments ===
- Kiesel Icon IC5
- Kiesel Vanquish V49K
- Kiesel Vanquish V59K
- Kiesel Xccelerator X44
- Kiesel Vader Headless Bass
- Kiesel CT624 Carved Top
- Roland FA-08 Workstation
- Roland KR-3 Piano

=== Pedals ===
- BOSS RC-3 Loop Station
- BOSS ODB-3 Bass Overdrive
- BOSS BB-1X Bass Overdrive
- BOSS GEB-7 Bass Equalizer
- BOSS SYB-5 Bass Synthesizer
- BOSS OC-3 Super Octave
- BOSS LMB-3 Bass Limiter Enhancer
- BOSS CEB-3 Bass Chorus
