= Antiseptic Bloodbath =

Studio album by Tourniquet
- Released: July 19, 2012
- Recorded: Chicago, Illinois, Milwaukee, Wisconsin
- Genres: Christian metal, neoclassical metal, progressive metal, thrash metal
- Length: 61:08
- Label: Pathogenic Records
- Producer: Neil Kernon

Tourniquet chronology
Where Moth and Rust Destroy (2003)	Antiseptic Bloodbath (2012)	Onward to Freedom (2014)

Antiseptic Bloodbath is the eighth full studio album released on July 19, 2012 by Tourniquet, a Christian metal band formed in 1989 in Los Angeles, California. It is the band's first release since 2003's Where Moth and Rust Destroy. It was long-time vocalist Luke Easter's last studio album before he was kicked out in 2015.

== Production ==
The band had released their previous album in a turbulent time in their history, when they didn't have a permanent guitarist. In late 2004, Aaron Guerra returned to the band. In 2008, Ted Kirkpatrick announced through the band's message board that the band's contract with Metal Blade Records had ended and that they were planning a new album. Bassist Steve Andino left the band during this period. Finally, in late 2010, the band announced a Kickstarter project that would allow fans to fund the next album, which was fully funded by January 2011. The band began the recording process in June 2011 with plans to release the album in summer of 2012.

The album was made available for pre-order on June 25, 2012 and digitally released to certain fans who funded the Kickstarter project on July 13, 2012. The album was released to the public on July 19, 2012 via iTunes, Amazon, and other online music sellers, and was released in CD format on August 15, 2012.

== Reception ==
Reviews among Christian media have been largely positive. The Phantom Tollbooth gave the album 5/5 and Indie Vision Music rated it 4/5. Powermetal.de rated the album 8.0 out of 10, finding the album very good, but missing an adequate rhythm guitarist and vocalist.

== Track listing ==
All lyrics are written by Ted Kirkpatrick unless otherwise noted; all music is composed by Ted Kirkpatrick unless otherwise noted.

No.	Title	Lyrics	Music	Length
1.	"Chart of the Elements (Lincchostbllis)"			6:38
2.	"Antiseptic Bloodbath"			6:11
3.	"The Maiden Who Slept in the Glass Coffin"			7:28
4.	"Chamunda Temple Stampede"			5:19
5.	"Flowering Cadaver"			5:19
6.	"86 Bullets"			5:12
7.	"Duplicitous Endeavor"	Luke Easter	Aaron Guerra	5:01
8.	"Lost Language of the Andamans"			6:56
9.	"Carried Away on Uncertain Wings"	Guerra; Easter	Guerra	4:51
10.	"Fed by Ravens, Eaten by Vultures"			8:08
Total length:				61:08

== Credits ==
=== Band ===
- Ted Kirkpatrick - drums, rhythm guitars, dulcimer, 8 string bazouki
- Luke Easter - lead vocals
- Aaron Guerra - guitars, bass

=== Guest musicians ===
- Pat Travers - lead guitar: "Antiseptic Bloodbath"
- Marty Friedman - lead guitar: "The Maiden Who Slept in the Glass Coffin"
- Bruce Franklin - lead guitar: "Chart of the Elements (Lincchostbllis)"
- Karl Sanders - lead guitar: "Chamunda Temple Stampede"
- Santiago Dobles - lead guitar: "86 Bullets", "Lost Language of the Andamans"
- Adrian Zitoun - cello: "The Maiden", "Lost Language", "Fed by Ravens"
- Denis Najoom - trumpet: "Antiseptic Bloodbath", "The Maiden", "Lost Language"
- Dave Bullock - violin: "The Maiden", "Lost Language", "Fed by Ravens"
- Neil Kernon - orchestral textures: "Duplicitous Endeavor"
- Hannah Kilburn, Grace Kilburn & Simi - cheerleader vocals: "Chart of the Elements (Lincchostbllis)"
- Pastor Bob Beeman - spoken word vocals: "Fed by Ravens", "Eaten by Vultures"
- Rick Muehlbach, Tyler Margritz - spoken word vocals: "Duplicitous Endeavor"

== See also ==
- Christian media
- Christian metal
- Christian rock
- Heavy metal
- Thrash metal
