= Microscopic View of a Telescopic Realm =

Studio album by Tourniquet
- Released: 2000
- Recorded: July 16 – September 5, 1999
- Studios: Topanga, California; Frankie's Hideaway in North Hollywood, California
- Genres: Christian metal, thrash metal, neoclassical metal, progressive metal
- Length: 69:52
- Label: Metal Blade Records
- Producers: Bill Metoyer; Tourniquet

Tourniquet chronology
Acoustic Archives (1998)	Microscopic View of a Telescopic Realm (2000)	Where Moth and Rust Destroy (2003)

Professional ratings
Review scores
Source	Rating
7ball	
Allmusic	3.5/5 stars
Cross Rhythms	10/10 stars
Matt Morrow	9.5/10 stars
The Phantom Tollbooth	Review 1: Review 2: (somewhat favorable) Review 3:
Johannes Jonsson	(highly favorable)
Powermetal.de	(Highly favorable)

Microscopic View of a Telescopic Realm is the sixth studio album by the American Christian metal band Tourniquet. It was released on Metal Blade Records in 2000. The title track includes Steve Rowe of the Australian Christian metal band Mortification as a guest vocalist and the song "The Skeezix Dilemma Part II (The Improbable Testimony of the Pipsisewah)" is a sequel to "The Skeezix Dilemma" from Tourniquet's 1992 album Pathogenic Ocular Dissonance. This album marks the return to the band's neo-classical technical thrash style of metal.

== Track listing ==
All lyrics are written by Ted Kirkpatrick unless otherwise noted; all music is composed by Ted Kirkpatrick unless otherwise noted.

No.	Title	Lyrics	Music	Length
1.	"Besprinkled in Scarlet Horror^{[a]}"			7:39
2.	"Drinking from the Poisoned Well"			7:32
3.	"Microscopic View of a Telescopic Realm" (featuring Steve Rowe)			6:13
4.	"The Tomb of Gilgamesh^{[a]}"			7:35
5.	"Servant of the Bones"	Luke Easter	Aaron Guerra	4:56
6.	"Erratic Palpitations of the Human Spirit"			6:25
7.	"Martyr's Pose"	Easter	Guerra	4:18
8.	"Immunity Vector" (Instrumental)			5:10
9.	"Indulgence by Proxy"			5:55
10.	"Caixa de Raiva"	Easter	Guerra	4:11
11.	"The Skeezix Dilemma Part II (The Improbable Testimony of the Pipsisewah)^{[a]}"			9:58
Total length:				69:52

^{a} appears on The Epic Tracks (2019)

== Personnel ==
Tourniquet

- Ted Kirkpatrick – drums, bass, guitar harmony lead ("Erratic Palpitations of the Human Spirit")
- Aaron Guerra – all other rhythm and lead guitars, bass, backing vocals
- Luke Easter – lead vocals

Guest musicians

- Cameron Stone – cello ("The Tomb of Gilgamesh" and "The Skeezix Dilemma Part II (The Improbable Testimony of the Pipsisewah)")
- Jennifer Hall – flute ("Besprinkled in Scarlet Horror" and "Immunity Vector")
- Steve Rowe of Mortification – guest vocals ("Microscopic View of a Telescopic Realm")

Additional personnel

- Engineered by Bill Metoyer
- Produced by Bill Metoyer and Tourniquet
- Photography: Jim Muth
- Cover art and design: Brian J. Ames
- Mixed at Frankie's Hideaway in North Hollywood, California
- Mastered by Tom Baker at Precision Mastering in Hollywood, California
