= Ted Kirkpatrick =

American musician (1960–2022)

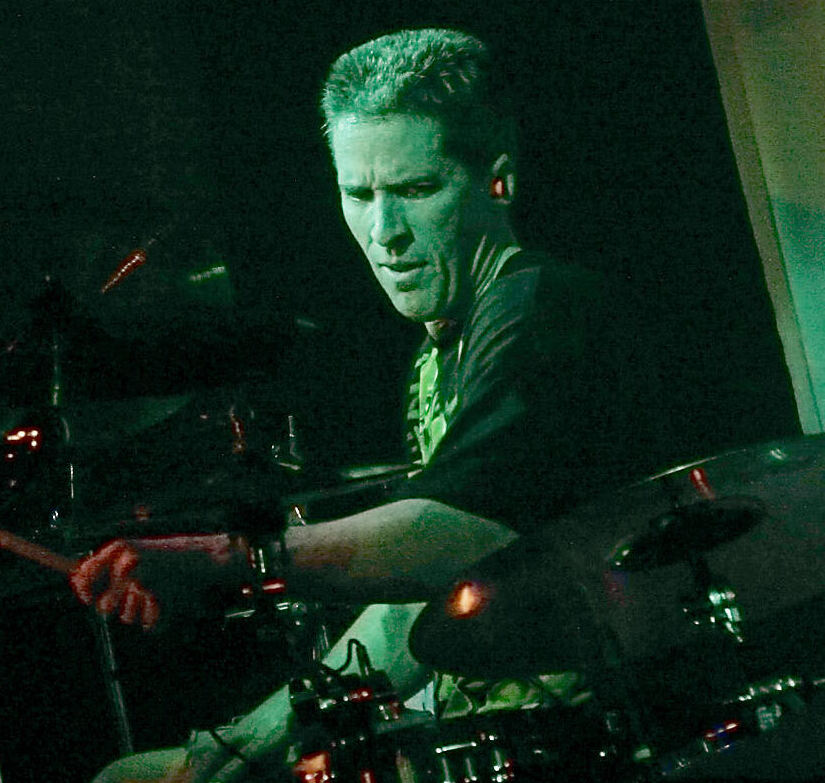
- Kirkpatrick in 2007

Background information
- Born: May 22, 1960; Milwaukee, Wisconsin, U.S.
- Died: August 19, 2022 (aged 62)
- Genres: Christian metal, thrash metal, progressive metal
- Occupations: Musician, songwriter
- Instruments: Drums, bass, guitar
- Years active: 1987–2022
- Formerly of: Tourniquet
- Website: tourniquet.net

Ted Kirkpatrick (May 22, 1960 – August 19, 2022) was an American musician and songwriter who is known for his work with the Christian thrash metal band Tourniquet. Primarily a drummer, Kirkpatrick was the principal songwriter for the band and played other instruments as necessary.

== Career ==
Kirkpatrick started as a touring drummer for the doom metal band Trouble in 1987 and played a few shows with the group. However, he soon left Trouble as he was unable to meet its touring commitments. In 1989, he formed Tourniquet with Guy Ritter and Gary Lenaire. The group performed a highly progressive style of thrash and speed metal, informed by Kirkpatrick's love of classical music. They released three albums in rapid succession, Stop the Bleeding in 1990, Psycho Surgery in 1991, and Pathogenic Ocular Dissonance in 1992. The band underwent some lineup changes and adopted a more hard rock approach for the 1994's Vanishing Lessons and 1997's Crawl to China. In the 2000s, the band returned to its thrash metal origins and released Microscopic View of a Telescopic Realm in 2000 and Where Moth and Rust Destroy in 2003. Apart from select touring and concert appearances, Tourniquet then went mostly inactive. However, in 2010 the band announced that it was recording new material and looking for a suitable label. In 2012, the band released Antiseptic Bloodbath. Kirkpatrick also released the album Onward to Freedom, which features his drumming supported by numerous guest musicians, through Tourniquet in 2014.

In addition to his work in Trouble and Tourniquet, Kirkpatrick independently recorded and released several solo recordings, including a stoner metal album and In the Shadow of the Masters, an album where Kirkpatrick drums to various classical recordings.

Kirkpatrick endorsed DW drums, Evans drumheads, Paiste cymbals, Vic Firth sticks as well as Orange guitar amplifiers.

== Influences ==
As principal lyricist for the band, Kirkpatrick's talent for allegory, symbolism, and using unusual and sometimes bizarre examples to convey Christian concepts can be found throughout the Tourniquet catalog.

A fan of ethnic and world music, he played or included other, less traditional (in terms of metal music) instruments on Tourniquet albums, including the Greek bouzouki, flute, banjo, and dulcimer. For the acoustic sets that Tourniquet occasionally performed, he played 6 or 12 string guitar. In terms of rock drumming, Kirkpatrick cited his main influences as Simon Phillips, Carl Palmer and Neil Peart.

== Animal welfare ==
Kirkpatrick supported animal welfare and showed his support in the Tourniquet songs such as "Ark of Suffering", "Stereotaxic Atrocities", "Going, Going, Gone", and in the cover art to their album Antiseptic Bloodbath. In 2010, he released a solo album, "Ode to a Roadkill", featuring animal sounds as lead "vocals". His love for butterflies and other insects influenced his and Tourniquet's album covers, and he said that the sounds of the jungle influenced his drumming as well.

== Death ==
Kirkpatrick died from idiopathic pulmonary fibrosis on August 19, 2022, at the age of 62.

== Awards and achievements ==
- Kirkpatrick was voted "Favorite Drummer" for ten years in a row, and again in 2003 by the readers of HM Magazine.
- He was featured twice in Modern Drummer Magazine.

== Bands ==
- Tourniquet – drums, occasional bass and guitar (1989–2022)
- Trouble – drums (1987–1989)

== Discography ==
=== With Tourniquet ===
Albums (as Tourniquet)

- Stop the Bleeding (1990)
- Psycho Surgery (1991) (2001 rerelease titled Psychosurgery)
- Pathogenic Ocular Dissonance (1992)
- Intense Live Series, Vol. 2 (1993) (also known as Recorded Live, Vol. 2)
- Vanishing Lessons (1994)
- Carry the Wounded (1995)
- The Collected Works of Tourniquet (1996)
- Crawl to China (1997)
- Acoustic Archives (1998)
- Microscopic View of a Telescopic Realm (2000)
- Where Moth and Rust Destroy (2003)
- Antiseptic Bloodbath (2012)
- Gazing at Medusa (2018)

Albums (as The Tourniquet Ark)

- Onward to Freedom (2014)

Solo

- Ode to a Roadkill (2010)
- In the Shadow of the Masters (2010)
- Ancient Christmas (2011)

Tribute albums

- Edgar Allan Poe: Spoken Tales of a Tortured Genius (2012)
- The Doom in Us All: A Tribute to Black Sabbath (2016)

Videos

- Ark of Suffering (1991) – music video
- Video Biopsy (1992) – VHS (re-released in 2000)
- Pushin' Broom Video (1995) – VHS
- The Unreleased Drum Solos of Ted Kirkpatrick (1997) – VHS
- Guitar Instructional Video (1998) – VHS
- Tourniquet Live in California (1998) – VHS
- Circadian Rhythms – The Drumming World of Ted Kirkpatrick (2003) – DVD
- Ocular Digital (2003) – DVD
- Till Sverige Med Kärlek (2006) – DVD

== Bibliography ==
- Jimmy Loggerhead's Sordid Summer (2020)
