= Lansing Campbell =

American illustrator (1882–1937)

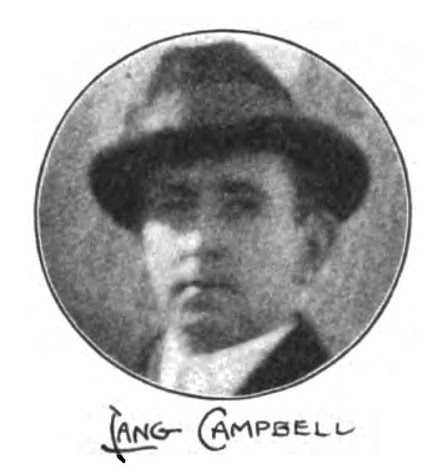
- Lang Campbell c. 1917
- Born: Louis Lansing Campbell; March 3, 1882; Carbondale, Illinois
- Died: May 26, 1937 (aged 55); Raleigh, North Carolina
- Occupation: Illustrator

Louis Lansing Campbell (March 3, 1882 – May 26, 1937) was an American illustrator best known for his illustrations in the Uncle Wiggily series of children's books by Howard R. Garis. He also used the signature Lang Campbell.

== Biography ==
Campbell was born Carbondale, Illinois in 1882, to John Gaines Campbell (1839–1913) and Alice Beman (1847–1920). He spent most of his life working in New York City.

In 1917, Campbell wrote and illustrated his own book, The Funnyfeathers (E. P. Dutton), featuring the adventures of the Dinky Duckings, Panty Banty, Pidgy the Poet, Daffy Duck and Old Crooky Crow. Other books by Campbell included Dippy Doodlebug, Bizzy Izzy Humbug, Duck and Applesauce, Dicky Bird's Diary and Merry Murphy. He also did Br'er Rabbit illustrations. His cartoons appeared in Life and Judge. He illustrated the cartoon strip, "Uncle Wiggily's Adventures" with Howard R. Garis and created "Piggy Pigtail", "Paddy the Pup", "Dippy Doodlebug", "Bizzy Izzy Humbug", "The Dinky Ducklings", "Duck and Applesauce", "Dicky Bird's Diary," "Merry Murphy" and more on his own.

From 1919 to 1929, he drew Uncle Wiggily's Adventures as a comic strip. During the decade, the comic strip's text evolved from captions to dialogue minus balloons to dialogue inside balloons. During the 1930s, he drew the Sunday strip Paddy Pigtail.

== Death ==
Campbell died in Raleigh, North Carolina on May 26, 1937, at the age of 55. He is buried in Oak Woods Cemetery in Chicago, Illinois.

== Cultural legacy ==
Campbell's Uncle Wiggily illustrations were the main influence on Chris Wedge's short film Bunny which won the Academy Award for Animated Short Film for 1998 as well as a Golden Nica at the Prix Ars Electronica. Howard Garis' grandson, Brooks Garis, has produced a video, Uncle Wiggily and the Pumpkin, with Lansing Campbell illustrations and music by Chris Brubeck.
