= Guy Ritter =

American singer (born 1966)

- Also known as: Chuck Pepper
- Born: 1966 (age 58–59)
- Origin: Oregon, U.S.
- Genres: Thrash metal; Christian metal; speed metal
- Occupation: Musician
- Instrument(s): Vocals, guitar
- Years active: 1985–1987, 1989–1993, 1996–2004, 2017

Guy Ritter (born circa 1966 (Note: The exact birth date of Guy Ritter is unknown. However, he started playing music in 1985 when he was nineteen, which puts his birth date around 1966.)) is an American heavy metal musician. He is best known as a former vocalist of the Christian metal band Tourniquet.

== History ==
Ritter started his musical career with the band Holy Danger. At the time of Holy Danger's beginning in 1985, Ritter was 19. The band disbanded in 1987. In 1989, Ritter had moved to Los Angeles to find musicians to play with. He found Gary Lenaire and Ted Kirkpatrick, and the three founded Tourniquet. The band recorded three albums before Ritter's departure in 1993, after the recording of Pathogenic Ocular Dissonance There was much speculation on why Ritter departed, such as "This was Guy Ritter's last album with the band. His reasons for leaving were he was getting tired of the thrash vocals and medical allegory" or "Apparently Guy Ritter was unhappy with this new heavier direction the band had taken and decided to part ways in the middle of the recording."

In 1996, Ritter and former bandmate Gary Lenaire formed a new band called Echo Hollow. They formed the band with Matt Rosenblum, a drummer Gary knew, and Matthew Fallentine, Ritter's now-brother-in-law. The band later on added Rafik Oganyan in June 2001. The band disbanded in 2004. In 2017, Ritter performed guest vocals on the song "Stop the Bleeding" on Lenaire's solo album, No Time Now. In 2020, it was announced that Ritter would be performing vocals, alongside Luke Easter, who replaced Ritter in Tourniquet, and Erik Mendez (ex-Tourniquet, 2050) playing guitar on the album, with David Husvik (Extol, Azusa) on drums, recording on Lenaire's sophomore solo album. In 2021, the band was announced as FLOOD, consisting of Ritter, Lenaire, Mendez, Husvik, and Anna Sentina.

== Personal life ==
Ritter is married to Christin Ritter, Matthew Fallentine's sister. They have two children. Ritter is an outspoken Christian. Ritter worked on editing systems for Fox Sports. He enjoys exercise, including hiking and cycling.

== Bands ==
Current

- Flood – vocals (2020–present)

Former

- Holy Danger – vocals, rhythm guitar (1985–1987)
- Tourniquet – vocals (1989–1993)
- Echo Hollow – vocals (1996–2004)

== Discography ==
Tourniquet

- Stop the Bleeding (1990)
- Psycho Surgery (1991) (2001 re-release titled Psychosurgery)
- Ark of Suffering (1991) – music video
- Video Biopsy (1992) – VHS
- Pathogenic Ocular Dissonance (1992)

Echo Hollow

- Diet of Worms (1998)
- Superficial Intelligence (2004)

Holy Danger

- One Way (1986)
- Demo (1986)

Other appearances

- Gary Lenaire – No Time Now (2017) (song "Stop the Bleeding")
