= Vanishing Lessons =

Studio album by Tourniquet
- Released: July 1, 1994
- Recorded: 1993
- Studios: Rumbo Recorders in Canoga Park, California
- Genres: Christian metal, hard rock, heavy metal, groove metal
- Length: 48:42 (original); 73:42 (remaster)
- Labels: Intense Records (original); Pathogenic Records (remaster)
- Producer: Jim Faraci

Tourniquet chronology
Pathogenic Ocular Dissonance (1992)	Vanishing Lessons (1994)	Carry the Wounded (1995)

2004 Cover

Professional ratings
Review scores
Source	Rating
Cross Rhythms	10/10 stars
Powermetal.de	(mildly favorable)

Vanishing Lessons is the fourth studio album by the American Christian metal band Tourniquet. It was originally released on Intense Records in 1994. It was the first Tourniquet album to feature then-lead vocalist Luke Easter, who joined the band in 1993. The songs "Bearing Gruesome Cargo," "Acid Head" and "K517" were included on the Tourniquet/Mortification Collector's Edition CD Single in 1994; the disc also featured tracks with Ted Kirkpatrick talking about Tourniquet and included material from the Australian Christian metal band Mortification's Live Planetarium and Blood World releases. A different version of "My Promise" was included on Tourniquet's extended play Carry the Wounded, and a music video for "Bearing Gruesome Cargo" was included on the band's VHS tape Pushin' Broom in 1995. This album was later bundled with 1992's Pathogenic Ocular Dissonance and released on KMG Records in 2000. Vanishing Lessons was independently re-released on Pathogenic Records with digital remastering, bonus tracks, and new artwork in 2004.

== Track listing ==
All lyrics are written by Ted Kirkpatrick unless otherwise noted; all music is composed by Ted Kirkpatrick unless otherwise noted.

No.	Title	Lyrics	Music	Length
1.	"Bearing Gruesome Cargo"			4:35
2.	"Pecking Order"			5:52
3.	"Drowning Machine"			4:45
4.	"Pushin' Broom"	Gary Lenaire		5:36
5.	"Vanishing Lessons"			4:21
6.	"My Promise"	Lenaire	Lenaire	4:32
7.	"Acid Head" (^{1})			4:24
8.	"K517"			2:11
9.	"Twilight"			4:03
10.	"Your Take"	Lenaire	Lenaire	3:21
11.	"Sola Christus"	Victor Macias	Macias	5:02
Total length:				48:42

^{1.} Titled "Acidhead" on the remaster.

2004 remaster bonus tracks
No.	Title	Length
12.	"HHS2 (Handel Harpsichord Suite #2)"	1:28
13.	"Acidhead (Live 2000)"	4:57
14.	"Pecking Order (Live 2002)"	5:47
15.	"Vanishing Lessons (Live 2002)"	4:25
16.	"Drowning Machine (Demo 1994)" (^{2})	4:27
17.	"Twilight (Demo 1994)" (^{2})	3:56
Total length:		73:42

^{2.} Excluded from the Brazilian remaster.

Brazilian version remaster exclusive live track
No.	Title	Length
16.	"Bearing Gruesome Cargo (Live 2000)"	4:27
Total length:		69:46

== Personnel ==
Tourniquet

- Luke Easter - vocals
- Gary Lenaire - guitar
- Victor Macias - bass
- Ted Kirkpatrick - drums

2000 and 2002 live tracks

- Ted Kirkpatrick - drums
- Luke Easter - vocals
- Aaron Guerra - guitars, vocals
- Steve Andino - bass guitar

Additional personnel

- Executive producer: Matthew Duffy
- Produced by: Jim Faraci
- Engineered by: Jim Faraci
- Assistant engineer: Michael Steinbrech
- Mixed by: Jim Faraci
- Recorded and mixed at Rumbo Recorders in Canoga Park, California
- Mastered by Chris Bellman at Bernie Grundman Mastering in Hollywood, California
- Photography: Jim Muth
- Art direction and design: Kristy Anderberg
- Additional backing vocals: Lavant Coppic (“Drowning Machine”)
- Additional guitar: M. Russo ("Drowning Machine," "Vanishing Lessons," "Twilight" and "Sola Christus")
