= Tourniquet (band) =

American heavy metal band

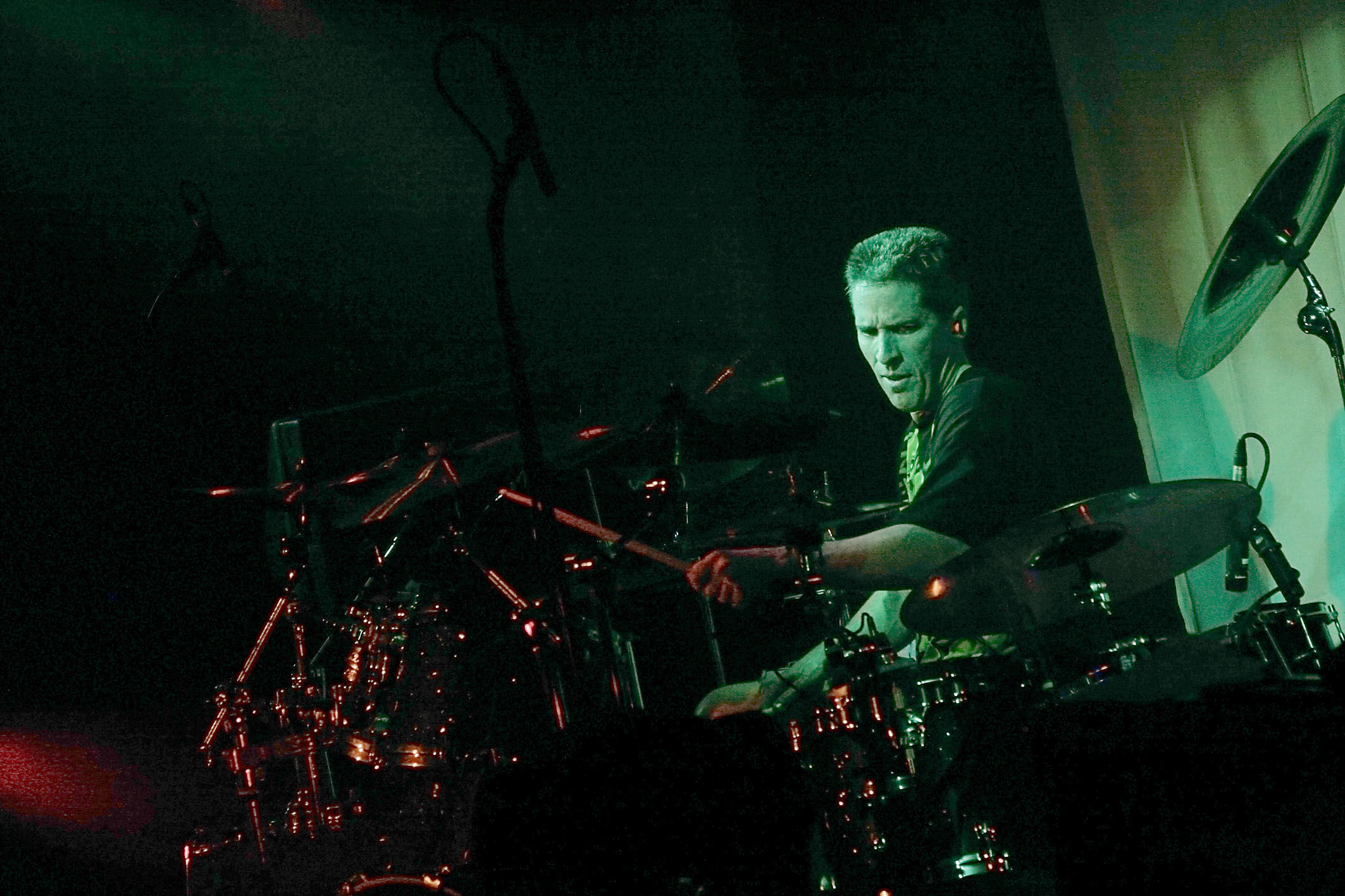
- Ted Kirkpatrick, the drummer and founding songwriter of Tourniquet

Background information
- Also known as: The Tourniquet Ark
- Origin: Los Angeles, California, U.S.
- Genres: Thrash metal, progressive metal, Christian metal
- Years active: 1987–2022, 2025–present
- Labels: Intense, Metal Blade, Benson
- Spinoffs: Echo Hollow, Cripple Need Cane, Lenaire, Flood, Stop the Bleeding
- Members: Gary Lenaire; Luke Easter; Anna Sentina
- Past members: Guy Ritter; Erik Mendez; Victor Macias; Vince Dennis; Steve Andino; Ted Kirkpatrick; Aaron Guerra

Tourniquet was an American heavy metal band that Ted Kirkpatrick, Guy Ritter, and Gary Lenaire formed in Los Angeles in 1987. Tourniquet played a mix of thrash and progressive metal, and was influenced by classical and world music. The band earned six GMA Dove Award nominations and won multiple recognitions from the readers of HM Magazine, including "Favorite Band of the 1990s" and "Favorite Album of the 1990s" for Pathogenic Ocular Dissonance (1992). They released ten studio albums, two live albums, four compilation albums, one EP, and several video releases. The last Tourniquet lineup consisted of Ted Kirkpatrick (drums) and Aaron Guerra (guitar, vocals, bass). The band disbanded after Kirkpatrick's death in 2022. Lenaire reformed the band in 2025 with Ritter, former vocalist Luke Easter, and bassist Anna Sentina. Ritter left the following year.

Tourniquet has sold more than 300,000 albums. In addition to classical music, the band is known for using medical terminology in their album and song titles and lyrics. The band's 2003 release, Where Moth and Rust Destroy, features special guests Marty Friedman (formerly of Megadeth) and Bruce Franklin (of Trouble) on lead guitar. Tourniquet's members protested animal abuse and appeared in The Vegetarian Times, United Animal Nations, and Animal Agenda.

The band is named after the tourniquet, "a surgical device for arresting hemorrhage by compression of a blood vessel." According to the band, a tourniquet is a metaphor for "a lifelong spiritual process by which a personal God, through the atoning blood, death, and resurrection of His only Son—Jesus Christ—can begin to stop the flow of going through life without knowing and serving our Creator. He is our Tourniquet."

== History ==
=== Classic lineup (1987–1993) ===
"Ark of Suffering"
Sample of "Ark of Suffering" by Tourniquet, from Stop the Bleeding (1990). A video was made for the song, containing footage of animal abuse, and it received some airplay on MTV before it was banned for being too graphic.

"A Dog's Breakfast"
Sample of "A Dog's Breakfast" by Tourniquet, from Psycho Surgery (1991). Representing their more modern-sounding thrash metal style, the song criticizes heretical sects and beliefs.

"Incommensurate"
Sample of "Incommensurate" by Tourniquet, from Pathogenic Ocular Dissonance (1992). Showcasing the band at its heaviest and darkest, the song deals with the power that good has over evil.

Tourniquet formed in 1987 with drummer Ted Kirkpatrick, vocalist Guy Ritter, and guitarist/vocalist Gary Lenaire. Kirkpatrick previously played in the Chicago doom metal group Trouble on their Run to the Light tour. The group was one of many bands who were, at the time, affiliated with a church group called Sanctuary - the rock and roll refuge in Los Angeles.

Tourniquet released its first studio album, Stop the Bleeding, in 1990. It was produced by Bill Metoyer of Metal Blade Records and released by Intense Records. While it was mostly distributed to Christian bookstores, Stop the Bleeding gained some notoriety in the mainstream metal scene and is considered a notable thrash metal album. Tourniquet's style broke new ground and quickly gained them fans all over the world. Musically, the album showcased elements of 1980s speed metal with its Mercyful Fate/King Diamond influences, notably the falsetto vocals. In this lineup, Guy Ritter sang the melodic vocal parts while Gary Lenaire did the aggressive, thrash metal shouts. Session guitarist Mark Lewis played lead guitars on the album. The band was later rounded out with the addition of bassist Victor Macias and lead guitarist Erik Mendez. This version of the group is commonly known as the "classic" lineup of Tourniquet. The band, including Macias and Mendez, filmed a music video for the song "Ark of Suffering". The video had some limited airplay on MTV, but the network quickly pulled it due to violent content portraying animal abuse. Because of the song and its subsequent video, the band became known for its stance on animal rights.

In 1991, Tourniquet abandoned most of its 1980s metal influences and recorded a more modern-sounding album titled Psycho Surgery. Psycho Surgery showcased Kirkpatrick's classical music influences more prominently than Stop the Bleeding, and his background in the pharmaceutical industry became apparent with many of the song's lyrics utilizing medical terminology as metaphors for social/spiritual issues. Some critics described it as if "Slayer plays Beethoven in a slightly rewritten way". On Psycho Surgery Tourniquet continued to work with producer Bill Metoyer and signed a distribution agreement with Metal Blade Records. Metal Blade released Psycho Surgery to a wider general market audience than the band had been able to reach with Stop the Bleeding. Intense Records released Psycho Surgery to Christian retail. Tourniquet released a home video (VHS) titled Video Biopsy the following year.

In 1992, Tourniquet released what is considered their most technical and dark album, Pathogenic Ocular Dissonance. Vocalist Guy Ritter had grown increasingly dissatisfied with the band's musical direction and didn't care for the more aggressive material the rest of the band was writing. He subsequently left the band after the recording of Pathogenic Ocular Dissonance due to these musical differences. Upon its release, Pathogenic Ocular Dissonance quickly became one of the most popular of the band's albums among Tourniquet fans. It went on to be voted Favorite Album of the 1990s by the readers of HM Magazine. As with the previous album, Metal Blade Records released Pathogenic Ocular Dissonance to the general market, with Intense Records marketing it to Christian retail. Luke Easter replaced Ritter, joining Tourniquet for the Pathogenic Ocular Dissonance tour. Prior to this Tourniquet was scheduled to play the Milwaukee Metalfest in 1993, but professed satanist Glen Benton of Deicide, the festival headliner, refused to play with a Christian band. The festival was forced to cancel Tourniquet's performance. This brought more publicity and notoriety to Tourniquet. That same year, Intense Records released Intense Live Series, Vol. 2, which includes Tourniquet's cover of the Trouble song "The Tempter". It was recorded between Ritter's departure and Luke Easter's joining of the band with the melodic vocals being handled by Bloodgood vocalist, Les Carlsen.

=== Heavy metal / hard rock era (1994–1999) ===
In 1994, Tourniquet abandoned most of the medical terminology in their lyrics, altered their style to a more accessible heavy metal/hard rock sound, and released Vanishing Lessons. Erik Mendez had left the band in 1993 after the tour for Pathogenic Ocular Dissonance, and so Vanishing Lessons was recorded by Tourniquet as a four-piece band. Soon after the album's completion, Aaron Guerra joined Tourniquet as Mendez's replacement in 1994. Metal Blade Records opted to not distribute Vanishing Lessons, and Tourniquet continued to work exclusively with Intense Records until 1997. The album spawned the single "Twilight", which became the band's first CCM radio hit. A music video was shot for the song "Bearing Gruesome Cargo", and was later released on the 1995 home video Pushin' Broom.

Shortly after the release of Vanishing Lessons, the band released an EP, Carry the Wounded, in 1995. Some Tourniquet fans had mixed feelings toward the EP's softer sound and the inclusion of a ballad. The band later released a compilation album, The Collected Works of Tourniquet, in 1996, which included two new songs "Perfect Night for a Hanging" and "The Hand Trembler". Many fans regard these as the heaviest songs Tourniquet has ever written.

In 1996, Victor Macias left the band of his own accord due to theological differences. Later that same year, Gary Lenaire was asked to leave Tourniquet. After Lenaire's departure, he and Ritter started the band Echo Hollow during that year.

In 1997, the band signed with Benson Records and released Crawl to China. Crawl to China generated divided opinions among both critics and fans because of its diverse, experimental material. A music video for the title track was released that year.

Ted Kirkpatrick was known for his drum solos, and he performed them in nearly every Tourniquet concert. Many of these performances had been filmed, and in 1997 these clips were compiled on a home video release (VHS) titled The Unreleased Drum Solos of Ted Kirkpatrick.

In 1998, the band recorded a number of songs in acoustic form, and released them on an album titled Acoustic Archives. This release also included a new song titled "Trivializing the Momentous, Complicating the Obvious". That same year, Tourniquet released two home videos titled Guitar Instructional Video and Tourniquet Live in California.

=== Return to thrash metal (2000–2010) ===
In 2000, Tourniquet began writing more thrash-oriented songs again. They signed directly to Metal Blade Records, and began work on Microscopic View of a Telescopic Realm, their most technical album since Pathogenic Ocular Dissonance. The aforementioned albums generated comparisons to each other, and Microscopic View of a Telescopic Realm contained a sequel to the Pathogenic Ocular Dissonance song "The Skeezix Dilemma" titled "The Skeezix Dilemma Part II - The Improbable Testimony of the Pipsisewah".

In 2001, Tourniquet reissued its first three albums, remastered and containing bonus tracks, on Pathogenic Records. In 2002, bassist Steve Andino - after filling in live for the band on many occasions - became an official member of Tourniquet. The band played various live venues until Aaron Guerra left the band for personal reasons.

In 2003, Ted Kirkpatrick, Luke Easter, and Steve Andino recorded Tourniquet's seventh studio album, Where Moth and Rust Destroy, with the help of guitarists Marty Friedman (formerly of Megadeth) and Bruce Franklin (Trouble). This release continues the technical and progressive direction of their previous album. The songs "Restoring the Locust Years" and "A Ghost at the Wheel" received some radio play. That same year, Tourniquet released two DVDs. The first, Ocular Digital, includes a live show from their 2001 performance at a Dutch festival called Flevo Festival, and a concert from 1991 in Escondido, California - the first Tourniquet concert ever. The second DVD release, titled Circadian Rhythms – The Drumming World of Ted Kirkpatrick, included many newly recorded drum solos as well as a DVD version of The Unreleased Drum Solos of Ted Kirkpatrick. This release also featured segments in which Ted, at his home and around town, answers questions from fans, and takes the viewer on a partial tour of his vast collection of butterflies and insects.

Aaron Guerra returned to Tourniquet in 2005, and they began to make sporadic appearances at concert events both in the U.S. and abroad. Notable shows include the Elements of Rock festival in Switzerland and Bobfest in Sweden. The Bobfest appearance was released on DVD as Till Sverige Med Kärlek (Swedish for "To Sweden With Love") in 2006.

=== Lineup changes and death of Ted Kirkpatrick (2010–2022) ===
On February 22, 2010, Blabbermouth.net reported that Tourniquet would record a new album in spring with noted producer Neil Kernon. The band stated, "We plan to release it as soon as it's finished in fall of this year." Kirkpatrick also announced plans to release solo albums of stoner metal and drumming over classical music. On November 10, Tourniquet announced a partnership with Kickstarter.com to fund the album's recording with fan packages and experiences for anyone who contributes toward the new album budget. On May 21, 2012, a contest concluded where a fan guessed the new album name from a series of clues. The band announced, via their Facebook page, that the album would be titled Antiseptic Bloodbath, which was released on July 19, 2012. The band re-released Tourniquet Live in California on DVD that same year.

In 2014, Kirkpatrick used Kickstarter to fund and release an album as The Tourniquet Ark called Onward to Freedom. Kirkpatrick was the only Tourniquet member to play on all of the songs, although other members of Tourniquet were involved, along with a number of guest musicians.

On December 28, 2015, longtime vocalist, Luke Easter, left the band. In 2017, the band announced they were playing at Exodo Festival, with the lineup of Kirkpatrick on drums, Aaron Guerra and Jamey Henn on guitars, vocalist Jason Robison, and former Holy Soldier member Andy Robbins on bass guitar.

In late 2017, Tourniquet began recording its tenth studio album. A week into 2018, the band announced that the album would come out shortly. On March 17, 2018, the band announced that Deen Castronovo (Fear Factory, Ozzy Osbourne) was performing vocals for the title track of the album. A month later, Tourniquet announced the lineup of the title track, rounding it out with Chris Poland returning on lead guitars. The album, Gazing at Medusa, was released in 2018. Tourniquet's third compilation album, The Epic Tracks, was released in 2019. In July 2020, the band announced their 11th studio album, The Slow Cosmic Voyage to Wisdom, which would feature doom metal renditions of many old songs, as well as a few new songs.

On August 19, 2022, Kirkpatrick died at age 62 of idiopathic pulmonary fibrosis. Later, on September 28, 2022, Aaron Guerra confirmed via his Facebook page that there were no plans to continue Tourniquet after the passing of Kirkpatrick, effectively ending the band. A two-minute demo sample of The 408 Zodiac Cipher, a song meant for the upcoming album, that Kirkpatrick had released on Youtube a month before his death became the last release of the band.

=== Reforming Under Gary Lenaire ===
In 2024 former Tourniquet members Gary Lenaire, Guy Ritter and Luke Easter formed a Tourniquet tribute band StB (acronym for Stop the Bleeding) along with Anna Sentina on bass, Neil Swanson (Richie Sambora, Orianthi) on guitar and Devin Chaulk (Haste the Day) on drums. They performed live at Immortal Fest. In February 2025, it was reported that Stop the Bleeding did not have legal rights to the name Tourniquet. However, a show performed in Sweden on March 29, 2025, with Lenaire, Ritter, Easter, Sentina, and David Husvik (Extol, Azusa) on drums, was subsequently described by Sentina, Husvik, and the band Extol, respectively, as a Tourniquet concert. During a June 7, 2025, live performance, Stop the Bleeding announced a name change to Tourniquet. Members include Lenaire on vocals and guitar, Luke Easter and Guy Ritter on vocals, and Anna Sentina on bass. The band performed two live shows that year and began recording a new album. On February 26, 2026, Lenaire announced that Ritter would not be appearing on the forthcoming album.

== Musical style ==
Tourniquet's early albums are technical thrash metal and characterized by a dark atmosphere. The songwriting is technically precise, and drummer Ted Kirkpatrick is known to play the guitar parts himself when he thinks that the other members' playing is not precise enough. Kirkpatrick's drumming incorporates poly-rhythms and peculiar, technical patterns. The band's first album is influenced by 1980s speed metal, but on later releases the band began incorporating more classical music in their songwriting, most notably on the albums Psycho Surgery and Pathogenic Ocular Dissonance. This is mostly due to Kirkpatrick's role as the main songwriter. Kirkpatrick cites Beethoven, Bach, and other classical composers as some of his primary musical influences. While there are some progressive elements on Pathogenic Ocular Dissonance, such as on "The Skeezix Dilemma", their later releases Microscopic View of a Telescopic Realm and Where Moth and Rust Destroy have more marked progressive metal influences.

Tourniquet's lyrical influences span a wide range; ranging from Old Testament narrative to medical allegories, to Edgar Allan Poe type descriptive horror. Many Kirkpatrick-penned lyrics incorporate medical terminology. Tourniquet has also dealt with unique social issues as well. "Ark of Suffering" (from Stop the Bleeding) generated significant attention by addressing animal abuse. "Ruminating Virulence" (from Pathogenic Ocular Dissonance) discusses the severely disabled. "Twilight" (from Vanishing Lessons) addresses the neglect of the elderly. All of these topics are addressed from a Biblical perspective.

== Accomplishments ==
Their music has received notice in the mainstream media, as well as the CCM market. The music video for "Ark of Suffering" received airplay on MTV, and garnered attention for its stance on animal abuse. Tourniquet has continued to take a very public stance on this issue, and so have been interviewed about it in magazines such as Vegetarian Times, Journal of the United Animal Nations, Animal's Agenda, and by PETA. Some critics have described them as being more proficient than many of their counterparts, and the band members have appeared in many music magazines. For example, Kirkpatrick has been featured on Modern Drummer, Drums, and Aaron Guerra has been interviewed in Guitar World and Guitar for the Practicing Musician.

=== Number one songs ===
The following songs have reached No. 1 in various sales and airplay charts:

- "Microscopic View" - Microscopic View of a Telescopic Realm
- "Crawl to China" - Crawl to China
- "Carry the Wounded" - Carry the Wounded
- "Heads I Win, Tails You Lose" - Carry the Wounded (CCM Rock Chart)
- "Vanishing Lessons" - Vanishing Lessons
- "Twilight" - Vanishing Lessons (CCM Rock Chart)
- "Acidhead" - Vanishing Lessons
- "Bearing Gruesome Cargo" - Vanishing Lessons
- "Pathogenic Ocular Dissonance" - Pathogenic Ocular Dissonance
- "Phantom Limb" - Pathogenic Ocular Dissonance
- "The Skeezix Dilemma" - Pathogenic Ocular Dissonance
- "Psycho Surgery" - Psycho Surgery
- "Spineless" - Psycho Surgery
- "Viento Borrascoso" - Psycho Surgery
- "Ark of Suffering" - Stop the Bleeding
- "Somnambulism" - Stop the Bleeding
- "You Get What You Pray For" - Stop the Bleeding

== Band members ==
Current members

- Gary Lenaire – guitar, vocals (1987–1996, 2025-present)
- Luke Easter – vocals (1993–2015, 2025-present)
- Anna Sentina - bass (2025-present)

Former band members

- Ted Kirkpatrick – drums (1987–2022), bass (1987–1990, 1996–1998, 1998–2002, 2008–2022) (died 2022)
- Guy Ritter – vocals (1987–1993, 2025)
- Erik Mendez – guitar (1990–1993)
- Victor Macias – bass (1990–1996)
- Vince Dennis – bass (1998)
- Steve Andino – bass (2002–2008)
- Aaron Guerra – guitar, vocals (1994–2003, 2005–2022), bass (studio, 2008–2022)

Live musicians

- Jason Robison – vocals (2017–2018)
- Max Dible – guitars (2018–2019)
- Ron Holzner – bass (1996–1997, 1999–2002)
- Les Carlsen – vocals (1993, 2018–2022)
- Andy Robbins – bass (2017–2022)
- CJ Grimmark – guitars (2019–2022)
- David Husvik - drums (2025)
- Devin Chaulk - drums (2024, 2025)

Session musicians

- Mark Lewis – guitar (1990)
- Erik Jan James – bass (1990)
- Deen Castronovo – vocals (2018)
- Tim "Ripper" Owens – vocals (2018)
- Chris Poland – guitar (2018)

Timeline

== Discography ==
Tourniquet discography
- Studio albums: 10
- Extended plays: 1
- Live albums: 2
- Compilation albums: 4
- Music videos: 3

Studio albums

- Stop the Bleeding (1990)
- Psycho Surgery (1991) (2001 re-release titled Psychosurgery)
- Pathogenic Ocular Dissonance (1992)
- Vanishing Lessons (1994)
- Crawl to China (1997)
- Microscopic View of a Telescopic Realm (2000)
- Where Moth and Rust Destroy (2003)
- Antiseptic Bloodbath (2012)
- Onward to Freedom (2014; as The Tourniquet Ark)
- Gazing at Medusa (2018)

Live albums

- Intense Live Series, Vol. 2 (1993) (also known as Recorded Live, Vol. 2)
- Live in California - 1998 (2010)

Compilations

- The Collected Works of Tourniquet (1996)
- Acoustic Archives (1998)
- The Epic Tracks (2019)
- The Slow Cosmic Voyage to Wisdom (2020)

EPs

- Carry the Wounded (1995)

Videos

- Ark of Suffering (1991) - Music video
- Video Biopsy (1992) - VHS
- Pushin' Broom Video (1995) - VHS
- Bearing Gruesome Cargo (1995) - Music video
- Crawl to China (1997) - Music video
- The Unreleased Drum Solos of Ted Kirkpatrick (1997) - VHS
- Guitar Instructional Video (1998) - VHS
- Tourniquet Live in California (1998) - VHS
- Video Biopsy (re-release) (2000) - VHS
- Circadian Rhythms - The Drumming World of Ted Kirkpatrick (2003) - DVD
- Ocular Digital (2003) - DVD
- Till Sverige Med Kärlek (To Sweden With Love) (2006) - DVD
- Tourniquet Live in California (re-release) (2012) - DVD

== See also ==
- Christian metal
- Instrumental rock
- List of rock instrumentals
