= Stop the Bleeding (Tourniquet album) =

Studio album by Tourniquet
- Released: July 1, 1990
- Recorded: 1990
- Studios: Mixing Lab A & B in Garden Grove, California
- Genres: Christian metal, speed metal, thrash metal
- Length: 46:24 (1990); 74:54 (2001/2011); 62:15 (2020)
- Label: Intense
- Producers: Roger Martinez; Tourniquet

Tourniquet chronology
Stop the Bleeding (1990)	Psycho Surgery (1991)

2001/2011 Cover

Stop the Bleeding is the debut studio album by the American Christian metal band Tourniquet. It was originally released on Intense Records in 1990. A remastered version was released independently on Pathogenic Records in 2001, which was later re-released in 2011. Retroactive Records released a Collector's Edition remaster on June 26, 2020. The remasters include updated artwork, expanded album booklets, and bonus tracks.

== Recording history ==
The band recorded Stop the Bleeding at Mixing Lab A & B studio in Garden Grove, California. The band's line-up consisted of Ted Kirkpatrick, Guy Ritter, and Gary Lenaire. Session musician Mark Lewis played nearly half of the album's lead guitar solos.

Prior to the album's recording, during an "Artists vs. Label" softball game, a label executive accidentally ran over drummer Ted Kirkpatrick's foot (his main kick foot) while rounding second base, requiring Kirkpatrick to record the album under a great deal of pain.

The band faced other recording obstacles as well, such a power failure that forced the producer to mix the songs over again. During a late-night recording session, the studio experienced a power outage, requiring producer Bill Metoyer to remix parts of the album. Another incident occurred while recording Tears of Korah, an eight-minute-long song, when the band accidentally omitted an entire verse without noticing. Since they were using two-inch tape, re-recording was costly. The error was discovered in the vocal booth, prompting Metoyer to creatively splice the missing verse into the track using half-inch tape and manual editing techniques.

In the original booklet, the band gave co-production credits to Roger Martinez, vocalist of fellow California-based Christian thrash metal group Vengeance Rising. However, Metal Blade Records' Bill Metoyer actually produced the album.

Roger Martinez was involved in the co-production of Tourniquet's first album. According to band members, Martinez expressed interest in co-producing, and his involvement was primarily for the recognition his name would bring due to the popularity of his band, Vengeance Rising, at the time. During recording sessions, producer Bill Metoyer handled the technical aspects, while Martinez would occasionally request volume adjustments, which Metoyer sometimes pretended to make. The phrase “One more DB, please” became an inside joke among the band and continued through subsequent albums.

== Overview ==
Musically, the album was said to be "unlike anything else on the market at the time" and incorporates classical music to 1980s-inspired speed and thrash metal riffs. Guy Ritter's vocals on the album, which he said were inspired by glam metal vocalists, shift between low-baritone and high-falsetto vocals, although they were performed higher on the demo versions:

In some of the early demos of those songs there were lots more high parts. That whole first verse on “You Get What You Pray For” was all high. Only on the final versions in the studio are all the parts lower. So we did tone it down a little before we recorded it.

Ritter's falsetto vocals are often compared to those of King Diamond:

...it is true, a lot of people used to ask me [Guy Ritter], “Have you heard King Diamond sing?” And, seriously, I had not ever heard him sing until after Stop the Bleeding came out. So many people said, “Oh, come on, you probably listened to a lot of King Diamond.” Finally, I was at Ted’s apartment, and he pulled out a CD, and he said, “Okay. You have got to listen to this King Diamond and see what you think," and I had to agree that, “Wow, this is kind of similar” (laughing).

The album cover art features a snake restrained by chains, representing the power good has over evil and how that relates to the death and resurrection of Jesus Christ, which was the ultimate victory over Satan. The bible verse 1 John 4:4, which reads in part, "Greater is He that is in me than he that is in the world," inspired this concept.

== Reception ==
Professional ratings
Review scores
Source	Rating
Allmusic	2.5/5 stars
Cross Rhythms	8/10 stars
Matt Morrow	8.0/10
Powermetal.de (Review of re-release)	(highly favorable)

The song "You Get What You Pray For" was the band's first single and stayed on top of the CCM metal charts for 21 weeks. It was also a GMA Dove Award nominee for "Metal Recorded Song of the Year."

The band's controversial music video for "Ark of Suffering," which contains graphic footage of animals in laboratories and slaughterhouses, received airplay on MTV before the channel ceased airing it after complaints that it was too graphic. Despite MTV's ban, the video won the Christian News Forum Contemporary Christian Music Award for "Rock Video of the Year," and Heaven's Metal magazine readers voted it their "Favorite Video of the Year." The music video was later included on the VHS tapes Hot Metal 4 in 1991 and Video Biopsy in 1992, as well as the DVD Ocular Digital in 2003.

About the song's airplay, Ritter said:

They [MTV] did play it, and quite a few times, as a matter of fact. We had people like [ Boston's ] Tom Scholz and Paul McCartney and [ Jefferson Airplane/Starship's ] Grace Slick calling MTV saying, “You have got to play this video!” So, what was happening was that Animals Agenda and some of these other magazines were calling these celebrities that they knew and saying, “We need you to call and get this MTV video on the air!”, and that is how it got played, by these stars, who we never got to meet! I can’t take credit for that. (laughter) And there was an interview, too, I think in Animals Agenda, where they interviewed Ted Nugent, and then they interviewed us and put us back-to-back in the same magazine. He [Nugent] talked about slaughtering the animals, and then we would come back and say, “Don’t slaughter the animals.” I still have that article. It was pretty cool.

== Track listing ==
No.	Title	Lyrics	Music	Length
1.	"The Test for Leprosy"	Ted Kirkpatrick	Kirkpatrick	4:38
2.	"Ready or Not"	Gary Lenaire; Guy Ritter	Lenaire; Ritter	3:30
3.	"Ark of Suffering"	Kirkpatrick	Kirkpatrick	4:14
4.	"Tears of Korah"	Lenaire	Lenaire	6:19
5.	"The Threshing Floor"	Ritter	Ritter	4:12
6.	"You Get What You Pray For"	Ritter	Ritter	3:22
7.	"Swarming Spirits"	Lenaire	Lenaire	3:23
8.	"Whitewashed Tomb" (Instrumental)		Kirkpatrick	4:21
9.	"Somnambulism"	Kirkpatrick	Kirkpatrick	4:38
10.	"Harlot Widow and the Virgin Bride"	Lenaire	Lenaire	7:47
Total length:				46:24

2001/2011 remaster exclusive bonus tracks
No.	Title	Length
11.	"Ark of Suffering (Live 2000)" (^{1})	4:39
12.	"The Test for Leprosy (Live 2000)"	4:19
13.	"Whitewashed Tomb (Demo 1990)" (Instrumental)	4:40
14.	"Tears of Korah (Demo 1990)"	6:31
15.	"Ark of Suffering (Demo 1990)"	3:56
16.	"Concert Intro (Live 1999)"	4:25
Total length:		74:54

^{1.} Excluded from the 2011 Brazilian remaster.

2011 Brazilian version remaster exclusive live bonus track
No.	Title	Length
11.	"Ark of Suffering (Live 2002)"	5:02
Total length:		51:26

2020 remaster exclusive bonus tracks
No.	Title	Length
11.	"The Test for Leprosy (Demo 1990)"	4:27
12.	"Somnambulism (Live 1992)"	4:29
13.	"Whitewashed Tomb (Live 1992)" (Instrumental)	2:05
14.	"The Test for Leprosy (Live 1992)"	4:50
Total length:		62:15

== Personnel ==
Tourniquet

- Guy Ritter – lead vocals
- Ted Kirkpatrick – drums, bass (1,3,8,9)
- Gary Lenaire – guitars, vocals, bass (2,4,6,7,10)

Additional musicians

- Erik Jan James – bass guitar
- Mark Lewis – lead guitar

Demo recordings

- Guy Ritter – lead vocals
- Ted Kirkpatrick – drums
- Gary Lenaire – guitars
- Mark Lewis – lead guitar

Live recordings (2001 remaster)

- Ted Kirkpatrick – drums
- Luke Easter – lead vocals
- Aaron Guerra – guitars, vocals, mixing and arranging on "Concert Intro 1999"
- Steve Andino – bass guitar

Production

- Tourniquet – producer (1990 version)
- Roger Martinez (Vengeance Rising) – producer (1990 version)
- Bill Metoyer (credited as Gordon Shumway) – producer, mixing, engineer (1990 version)
- Eric Greedy, Guy Ritter – engineer (1990 version)
- Eric Kibbe – assistant engineer (1990 version)
- Matthew B. Hunt – executive producer (2020 version)
- Ted Kirkpatrick – producer (2020 version)

Additional personnel

- Devino – visual performance art
- Jim Martin, Tourniquet – logo concept
- Ed McTaggart – art direction
- Jim Muth – photography
- Ken Taufer – illustration
- Charmeine Ellison, Lisa, Meloeny, Cherie Sunn – hair styling
- Joe Potter – layout (1990 version)
- William Cooke – remastering at Raven Mastering in Chatsworth, California (2001 version)
- Rob Colwell, Mark Fields – remastering at Bombworks Sound in McKinney, Texas (2020 version)
- Scott Waters (Ultimatum) – design, layout (2020 version)
- Ted Kirkpatrick – liner notes (2020 version)
