= Pathogenic Ocular Dissonance =

Studio album by Tourniquet
- Released: July 1, 1992
- Studio: Cornerstone Recorders (Chatsworth, California); Track Record Studios (North Hollywood); Silver Cloud (Burbank); Preferred Sound (Woodland Hills); Mixing Lab A (Garden Grove)
- Genre: Christian metal, thrash metal, progressive metal
- Length: 57:23 (1992); 63:33 (1993); 73:20 (2001); 74:14 (2020)
- Label: Intense Records
- Producer: Bill Metoyer

Tourniquet chronology
Psycho Surgery (1991)	Pathogenic Ocular Dissonance (1992)	Vanishing Lessons (1993)

2001 Cover

Professional ratings
Review scores
Source	Rating
Cross Rhythms	10/10 stars
Rock Hard	8.5/10

Pathogenic Ocular Dissonance is the third studio album by the American Christian metal band Tourniquet. It was originally released on Intense Records in 1992 to the Christian market and later released on Metal Blade Records in 1993 to the secular market. It is the last Tourniquet album to feature vocalist Guy Ritter, who left the band after the recording of the album. It was independently re-released on Pathogenic Records in 2001 with digital remastering, two bonus live tracks from the 2000 Dutch Flevo Festival featuring then-lead vocalist Luke Easter, and new cover art (with "Dissonance" misspelled as "Dissonence" on the tray liner edges). Retroactive Records released a Collector's Edition remaster on June 26, 2020 with the original cover art, an expanded album booklet, and four different bonus tracks. Pathogenic Ocular Dissonance was voted as the "Favorite Album of the 1990s" by readers of HM Magazine. In 2010, HM Magazine ranked it #23 on the Top 100 Christian metal albums of all-time list.

== Recording history ==
Pathogenic Ocular Dissonance was recorded at five studios. The album was produced by Metal Blade Records' Bill Metoyer. The album's name is a reference to 2 Corinthians 4:18.

Musically, the album went for a more aggressive thrash metal direction. The songs are complicated, technical and feature experiments with styles such jazz and blues. The latter can be heard on the song "Phantom Limb". The band's characteristical style of incorporating classical music into its guitar riffs is especially reminiscent on the beginning of the title track. The album introduced more Slayer-esque shouting vocal patterns by Gary Lenaire as well as a darker atmosphere. Guy Ritter sang less on the album than on previous Tourniquet albums. It is often thought that the vocalist Guy Ritter left the band during the recording session. However, during an interview with HM Magazine in 2007 he clarified:

It [leaving the band] was actually right after we finished [the recording of the album]. Otherwise I wouldn’t have had any vocals on that album. (laughter) We had just finished the album and it was not too long after it came out.

Ritter stated his reasons for leaving the band:

I am not being critical of the band or where the direction they went, but for me the band was always more of "this is a ministry and we just happen to play heavy metal." I got into music for that reason. I was originally into pop music, but when I saw what Stryper was doing with music I went and tried to learn that style because it was a tool to reach people. Ted and Gary were always great metal players before I met them. They are just phenomenal musicians. I have never really been good at any instrument. I play a little of every instrument…drums, guitar or keyboard. I am not great at anything. But I learned a style of singing and tried to write the songs that I wrote for Tourniquet on guitar because I felt like it was a tool to reach people. By the time we finished Pathogenic I felt like we were more of a metal band, we were Christians in a band. That is the way I felt. It was my personal opinion. We weren’t praying as much as we were before and weren’t doing things like we used to like meeting with a musical pastor. Our focus was just different. Couple that with the music…I really just wasn’t into the thrash vocals as far as the yelling type shouting vocals. I wanted that to be a compliment to the singing. I just felt like there was too much yelling on the POD album and I sat down with Ted and Gary and I told them that if I was going to stay that I wanted to do less yelling and maybe do some more ballads or some more commercial stuff. I remember Ted saying if anything it was going to get heavier.

According to Ritter, there was also some disagreements concerning the label:

The label was not paying us for royalties at all. Almost nothing. Just enough to probably be legal about it. And I really wanted to audit the label. We got paid maybe $3000 in royalties the whole time I was in the band. Then we got a letter saying, "We paid you too much so we are going to have to take payments of a thousand or more back!" It was crazy. And I couldn’t get the band to agree with me that we needed to audit the label. So I had some disagreements there. It wasn’t like this big fight or anything. You never would have thought there would be the tension there was after I left the band.

== Themes ==
The lyrics kept the pattern that began on Psycho Surgery and feature bizarre medical terminology. These terms and syndromes are used as metaphors for spiritual and social issues. The album title refers to color blindness and the title song uses it as a metaphor for lack of wisdom of sight from God. "Gelatinous Tubercles of Purulent Ossification" is about nicotine addiction that causes larynx benediction. The sound samples of the song are produced with Western Electric 5000 voice synthesizer.

The album's final song "The Skeezix Dilemma" uses the board Uncle Wiggily's (also a children's book series by Howard Roger Garis) concept as an allegory for child abuse. The song starts out with a minute of circus music (organ played by Bob Beeman) which is followed by a nervous child reading a bit of the game's introduction. The heavy metal song "Exoskeletons" contains a short riff of Black Sabbath's 1972 song "Supernaut" at the end. The Metal Blade Records version of Pathogenic Ocular Dissonance contains a live version of Trouble's 1984 song "The Tempter" from Tourniquet's Intense Live Series, Vol. 2 and features vocalist Les Carlsen of the American Christian metal band Bloodgood; this track was later included on the 2020 remaster along with three instrumental demos.

== Track listing ==
No.	Title	Lyrics	Music	Length
1.	"Impending Embolism"	Ted Kirkpatrick	Kirkpatrick	2:04
2.	"Pathogenic Ocular Dissonance"	Kirkpatrick	Kirkpatrick	4:25
3.	"Phantom Limb"	Kirkpatrick	Kirkpatrick	5:40
4.	"Ruminating Virulence"	Kirkpatrick	Kirkpatrick	5:30
5.	"Spectrophobic Dementia"	Gary Lenaire	Lenaire	5:15
6.	"Gelatinous Tubercles of Purulent Ossification"	Kirkpatrick	Kirkpatrick	5:12
7.	"Incommensurate"	Victor Macias	Macias	5:47
8.	"Exoskeletons"	Guy Ritter	Ritter; Lenaire	3:55
9.	"Theodicy on Trial"	Ritter	Ritter; Lenaire	4:28
10.	"Descent into the Maelstrom" (Instrumental)		Kirkpatrick	1:31
11.	"En Hakkore"	Lenaire	Lenaire	3:38
12.	"The Skeezix Dilemma"	Kirkpatrick	Kirkpatrick	9:58
Total length:				57:23

Metal Blade Records bonus live track
No.	Title	Length
13.	"The Tempter (Live 1993)" (featuring Les Carlsen)	6:10
Total length:		63:33

2001 remaster exclusive bonus tracks
No.	Title	Length
13.	"Pathogenic Ocular Dissonance (Live 2000)"	5:27
14.	"Bearing Gruesome Cargo/drum solo (Live 2000)"	10:30
Total length:		73:20

2020 remaster exclusive bonus tracks
No.	Title	Length
13.	"The Tempter (Live 1993)" (featuring Les Carlsen)	6:10
14.	"Impending Embolism (Demo) [instrumental]"	2:01
15.	"Pathogenic Ocular Dissonance (Demo) [instrumental]"	3:58
16.	"Ruminating Virulence (Demo) [instrumental]"	4:42
Total length:		74:14

== Personnel ==
Tourniquet

- Guy Ritter – lead vocals
- Ted Kirkpatrick – drums, hymn guitar and 12 string guitar on "The Skeezix Dilemma"
- Gary Lenaire – lead guitars, rhythm guitars, vocals
- Erik Mendez – lead guitars, rhythm guitars, vocals
- Victor Macias – bass guitar, vocals

Additional musicians

- Pastor Bob Beeman – circus keyboards on "The Skeezix Dilemma"
- Evan Price – child voice on "The Skeezix Dilemma"
- Acorn Kirkpatrick – Skeezix vocals on "The Skeezix Dilemma"
- Les Carlsen (Bloodgood) – vocals on "The Tempter"

Live recordings (2001 remaster)

- Ted Kirkpatrick – drums
- Luke Easter – lead vocals
- Aaron Guerra – guitars, vocals
- Steve Andino – bass guitar

Production

- Bill Metoyer – producer, mixing, engineer (1992 version)
- Pete Magdaleno, Thom Roy, Pat Whoel – assistant engineers
- Matthew B. Hunt – executive producer (2020 version)
- Ted Kirkpatrick – producer (2020 version)
- Mixed at Mixing Lab A in Garden Grove, California

Additional personnel

- Matthew Duffy – A&R direction
- Patrick House – photography
- Brian Godawa – art direction
- Jim Muth – photography
- Joe Potter – design, cover (1992 version)
- Brian J. Ames – layout, cover (2001 version)
- William Cooke – remastering at Raven Mastering in Chatsworth, California (2001 version)
- Rob Colwell, Mark Fields – remastering at Bombworks Sound in McKinney, Texas (2020 version)
- Scott Waters (Ultimatum) – design, layout (2020 version)
- Chris Jericho, Ted Kirkpatrick – liner notes (2020 version)
