= David Zaffiro =

American record producer

David Zaffiro is an American record producer and guitarist.

== Career ==
Zaffiro began his musical pursuits with friends he met in Seattle, Washington, assisting the formation of the band Topaz and later the Crystal City Rockers. His professional career began as guitarist for the metal band Bloodgood. Though he officially left the band following their third album, he did play various parts on later albums. He then began producing records independently and for others. Artists with whom he has worked include Acquire the Fire, Andy Chrisman, A Worship House, Brett Williams, Broken Silence, Eli, End Time Warriors, Holy Soldier, Julie Miller, Kate Miner, Kim Hill, Little Big Town, The Passion Worship Band, Paul Q-Pek, Point of Grace, Whitecross and Zion.

== Discography ==
=== Studio albums ===
- The Other Side (1989)
- In Scarlet Storm (1990)
- Surrender Absolute (1992)
- Yesterday's Left Behind (1994)

=== with Bloodgood ===
- Bloodgood (1986)
- Detonation (1987)
- Rock in a Hard Place (1988)
