= Intense Records =

Independent Christian metal record label

- Parent company: Frontline Records
- Status: defunct
- Genre: Christian metal
- Country of origin: United States

Intense Records was an independent record label whose releases were mostly in the metal genre. Intense was bought out in 1989 by Frontline Records and became an imprint of that company. The bands in their roster were some of the premiere Christian metal bands of the 1990s.

== Artists ==
- Angelica
- Deliverance
- Die Happy
- globalWAVEsystem
- Rose
- Magdallan
- Mortal
- Mortification
- Poor Old Lu
- Recon
- Sacred Warrior
- Ken Tamplin
- Tourniquet
- Vengeance Rising
- David Zaffiro
- Saviour Machine

== See also ==
- Alarma Records
- List of record labels
