= List of Hirax band members =

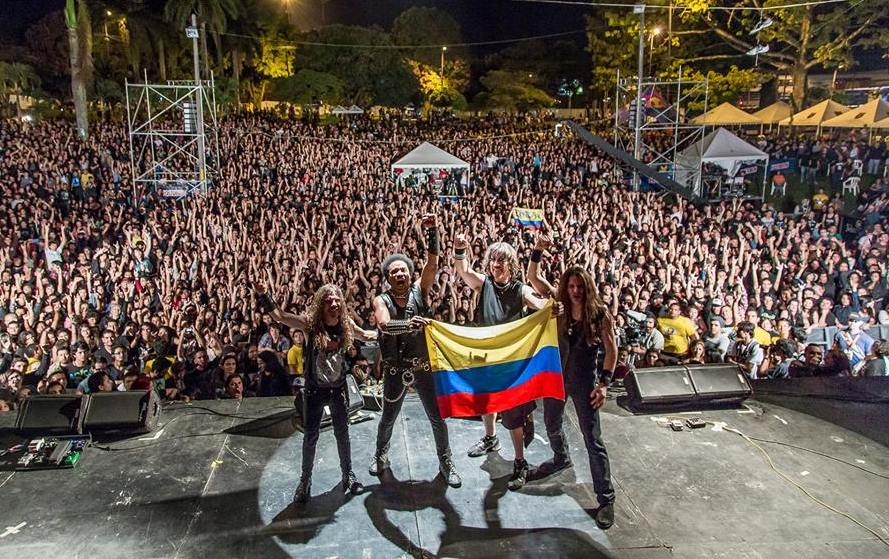
Hirax onstage in 2013.

Hirax is an American thrash metal band from Cypress, California. Formed in 1984, the group originally consisted of vocalist Katon W. De Pena, bassist Gary Monardo, guitarist Bob Savage and drummer Brian Keith. The band's current lineup includes De Pena alongside bassist Jose Gonzalez (since 2024), drummer Mathew Morales and guitarist Geremi Perez (both since 2025).

== History ==
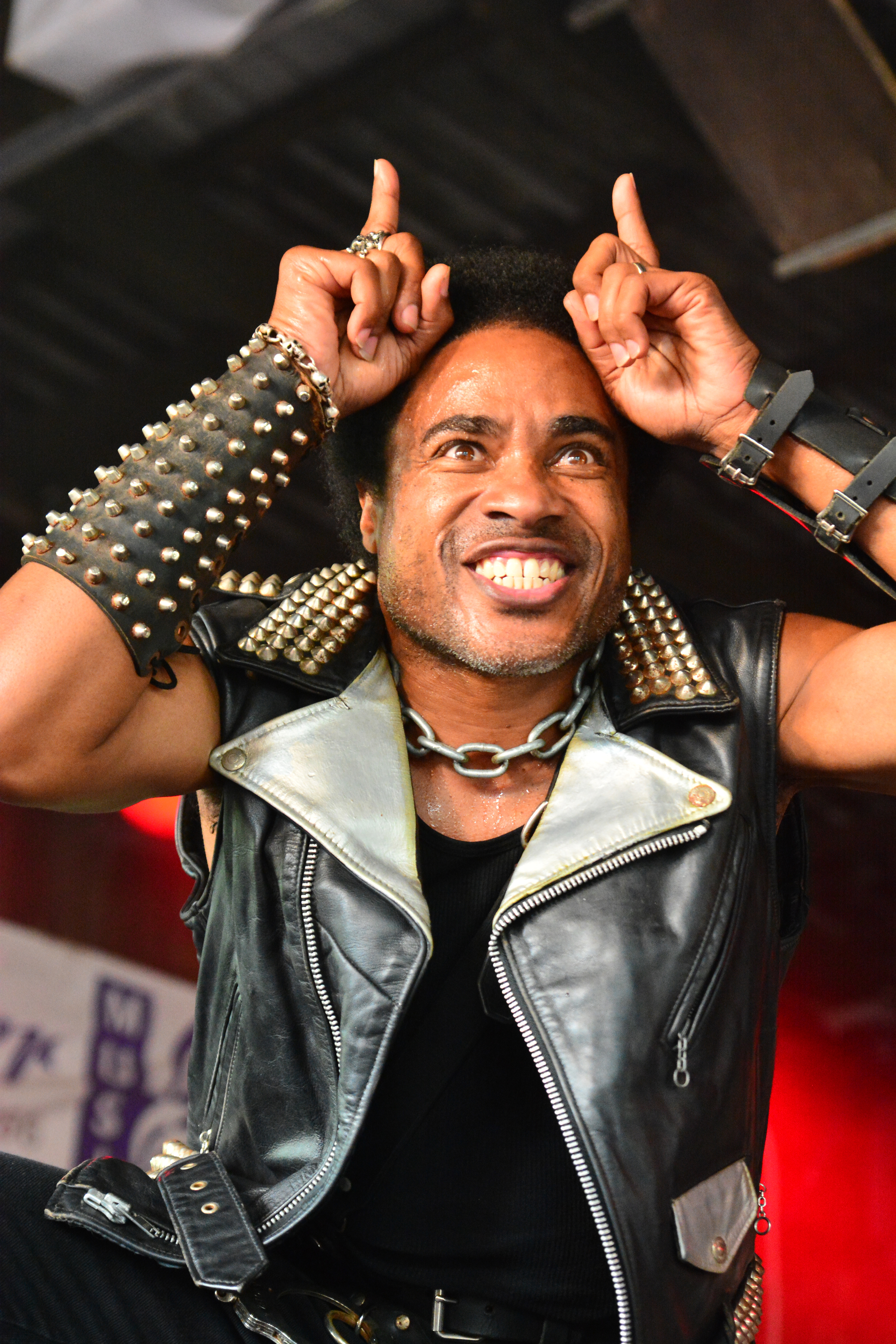
Vocalist Katon W. De Pena has remained a member of Hirax since its formation in 1984, save for a brief hiatus in 1986/1987.

=== 1984–1988 ===
After playing together in various bands together for "about four years", vocalist Katon W. De Pena, bassist Gary Monardo, guitarist Bob Savage and drummer Brian Keith formed Hirax in February 1984, recording a self-titled four-track demo in March. Shortly after recording the demo, Savage and Keith were replaced by Scott Owen and Johnny Tabares, respectively, just a few weeks before a Californian tour in July. De Pena claimed that neither musician wanted to play "thrashing power metal" anymore, suggesting that Savage "wanted to do more technical stuff" and that Keith was "just a wimp". Shortly after the release of the band's full-length debut Raging Violence at the end of 1985, Tabares was replaced by former Dirty Rotten Imbeciles and Death drummer Eric Brecht, who debuted on the band's second album Hate, Fear and Power that summer.

Around the time of the second album's release, De Pena left Hirax. He subsequently formed a group called Phantasm in September 1986. After briefly working with a vocalist known only as "Steve", the remaining members of Hirax brought in former Exodus frontman Paul Baloff to replace De Pena, although he soon left as he did not want to relocate to Los Angeles from San Francisco. By early 1987, only Owen and Brecht remained, as Monardo had left to form Cold Blood, with his place taken in Hirax by Sherman Jones. Billy Wedgeworth was the band's singer during this period. In the summer of 1987, De Pena and Monardo returned to Hirax, having left their new bands. Tabares also returned, replacing Brecht on drums. The newly reformed lineup released the demo Blasted in Bangkok later that year. Around a year later, Hirax disbanded.

=== 2000–2007 ===
In the summer of 2000, Hirax was reformed by Katon W. De Pena, Scott Owen, Gary Monardo and Johnny Tabares. Owen did not remain, however, and was replaced by Greg Eickmier for the recording of the EP El Diablo Negro. At the beginning of 2001, De Pena announced a new lineup including guitarists Justin Lent and James Joseph Hubler, bassist Shaun Ross, and drummer Per Möller Jensen. Ross and Jensen left before the recording of Barrage of Noise, with bass played by Lent and drums by Nick Seelinger. Shortly after the EP's release, a new lineup of De Pena, Hubler, Jim Durkin (guitar), Mike Brickman (bass) and Dan Bellinger (drums) was announced.

In early 2002, Durkin left Hirax and the band reverted to a four-piece lineup. By the summer, Hubler had been replaced by Roberto Carrero, with the new lineup recording a show in September for release as the video Violent Assault Live. Around early 2003, Carrero was joined by second guitarist Glenn Rogers and Bellinger was replaced by Jorge Iacobellis. Later in the year, Dave Watson and Angelo Espino replaced Carrero and Brickman, respectively. The new lineup released the band's first full-length album since their return, The New Age of Terror, in early 2004. Dave Chedrick replaced Iacobellis in mid-2004. In 2006, the live video Thrash 'Til Death was released, featuring footage of various festival performances from all three lineups active between 2003 and 2005.

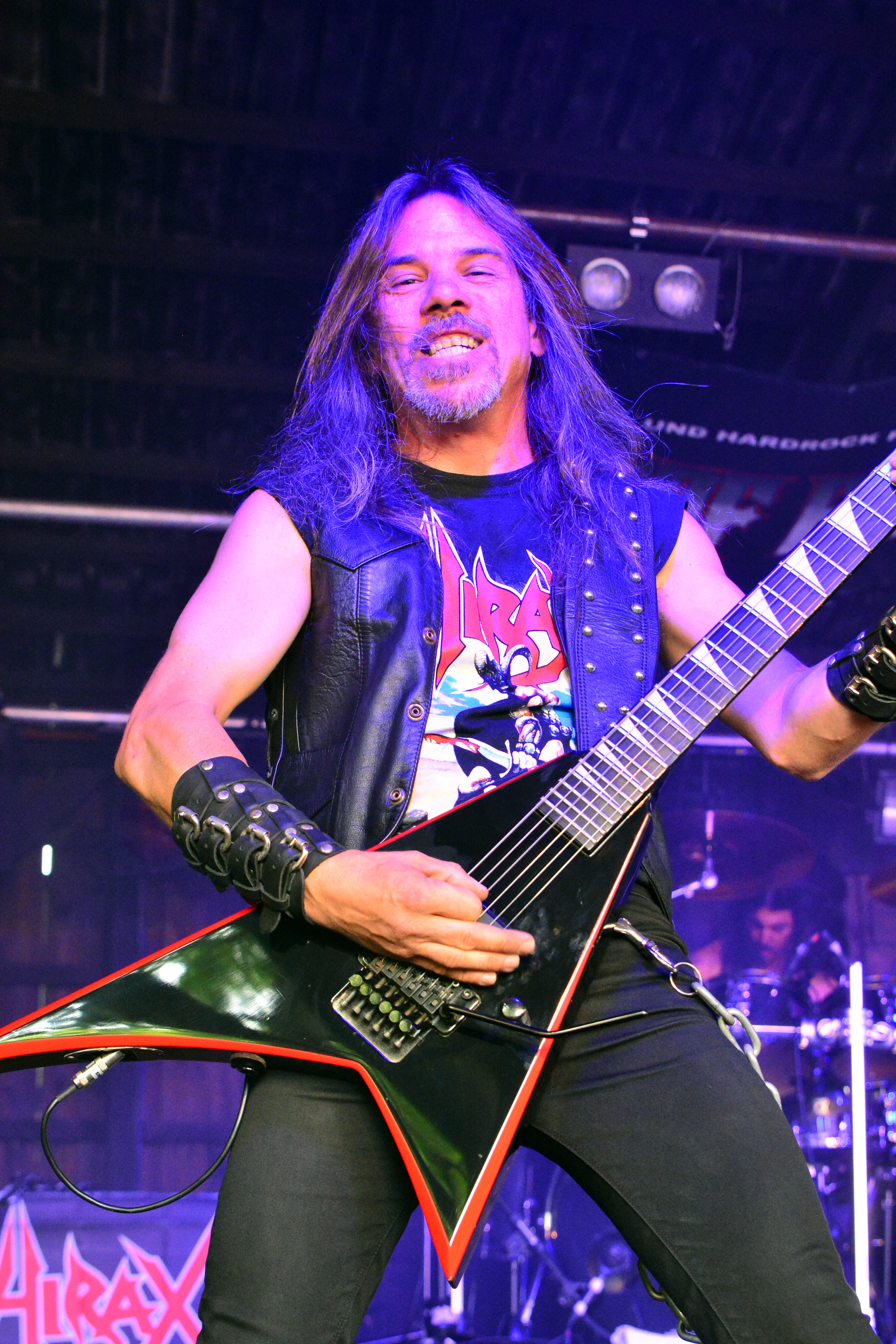
Lance Harrison played guitar for Hirax from 2006 to 2021.

In November 2005, it was announced that Hirax had cancelled an upcoming Japanese tour after Rogers, Watson, Espino and Chedrick had all left the band. A few days later, Rogers claimed that De Pena cancelled the tour as he wanted to fire Espino and Chedrick, leading all four members to quit. In February 2006, the band announced the return of early drummer Johnny Tabares and the addition of Lance Harrison on guitar, although by April the drummer had been replaced by Fabricio Ravelli, while Rogers had returned and Steve Harrison had joined on bass. This lineup released the EPs Assassins of War and Chaos and Brutality in 2007.

=== Since 2007 ===
Just a year after joining the band, Fabricio Ravelli left Hirax in April 2007 to pursue other projects. Rogers also left for a second time to focus on his work with Once Dead. After a single show as a four-piece with drummer Miguel Moran, the group reunited with Ravelli in September, when Tim Thomas also took over from Rogers. By early 2008, Rogers had returned for a third tenure. That May, drummer Jorge Iacobellis also returned. The band released its fourth album El Rostro de la Muerte in August 2009. By early 2011, Rogers had left Hirax for a third and final time, with Tim Thomas returning in his place. Later in the year, Mike Guerrero replaced Thomas, debuting at a show in Poland that November. The new lineup released the singles "La Boca de la Bestia" in October 2012 and "Hellion Rising" in November 2013.

By the end of summer 2013, Hirax had returned to a four-piece lineup again following the departure of newest member Guerrero. The band's fifth full-length album Immortal Legacy was released in February 2014, featuring guest contributions from former members Jim Durkin (guitar) and Fabricio Ravelli (drums). Around the time of its release, Iacobellis was replaced by Mike Vega. The lineup of Hirax remained stable for several years thereafter, save for a couple of occasions during 2018 and 2019 when Steve Harrison was temporarily replaced for select shows by Kelly McLauchlin. In early 2022, after around eight years with the same members, Hirax unveiled an all-new lineup of Neil Metcalf on guitar, Chris Aguirre II on bass and Francisco Zamudio on drums. Around a year later, Zamudio was replaced by Danny Walker.

After recording the Faster than Death demo, Aguirre was replaced by McLauchlin during the summer of 2023. The band recorded the full album later in the year with a lineup of De Pena, Walker and Metcalf (also covering bass). In early 2024, McLauchlin and Walker were replaced by Jose Gonzalez and Emilio Marquez, respectively. By the summer, Metcalf had also left, replaced by Allan Chan. Marquez was replaced by Mathew Morales in early 2025. In the summer, Geremi Perez joined on second guitar.

== Members ==
=== Current ===
Image	Name	Years active	Instruments	Release contributions
	Katon W. De Pena	1984–1986; 1987–1988; 2000–present	lead vocals	all Hirax releases
	Jose Gonzalez	2024–present	bass, backing vocals	none to date
	Mathew Morales	2025–present	drums	none to date
	Geremi Perez	2025–present	guitars, backing vocals	none to date

=== Former ===
Image	Name	Years active	Instruments	Release contributions
	Gary Monardo	1984–1987; 1987–1988; 2000–2001	bass	all Hirax releases from the Hirax demo (1984) to El Diablo Negro (2000)
	Bob Savage	1984	guitars	Hirax demo (1984)
	Brian Keith	1984	drums	Hirax demo (1984)
	Scott Owen	1984–1988; 2000	guitars	Raging Violence (1985); Hate, Fear and Power (1986); Blasted in Bangkok (1987)
	Johnny Tabares	1984–1986; 1987–1988; 2000–2001; 2006	drums	Raging Violence (1985); Blasted in Bangkok (1987); El Diablo Negro (2000)
	Eric Brecht	1986	drums	Hate, Fear and Power (1986)
	Steve (surname unknown)	1986	vocals	none
	Paul Baloff (1960–2002)	1986–1987	vocals	none
	Billy Wedgeworth (1967–2010)	1987	vocals	none
	Sherman Jones	1987	bass	none
	Greg Eickmier	2000–2001	guitars	El Diablo Negro (2000)
	James Joseph Hubler	2001–2002	guitars	Barrage of Noise (2001)
	Justin Lent	2001	guitars; bass	Barrage of Noise (2001)
	Shaun Ross	2001	bass	none
	Per Möller Jensen	2001	drums	none
	Nick Seelinger	2001	drums	Barrage of Noise (2001)
	Mike Brickman	2001–2003	bass	Violent Assault Live (2002)
	Dan Bellinger	2001–2003	drums	Violent Assault Live (2002)
	Jim Durkin	2001–2002	guitars	Immortal Legacy (2014)
	Roberto Carrero	2002–2003	guitars	Violent Assault Live (2002)
	Glenn Rogers	2003–2005; 2006–2007; 2008–2011	guitars	The New Age of Terror (2004); Thrash 'Til Death (2006); Assassins of War (2007); Chaos and Brutality (2007); El Rostro de la Muerte (2009)
	Jorge Iacobellis	2003–2004; 2008–2014	drums	The New Age of Terror (2004); Thrash 'Til Death (2006); El Rostro de la Muerte (2009); First Time in Poland (2011); "La Boca de la Bestia" (2012); "Hellion Rising" (2013); Immortal Legacy (2014)
	Dave Watson	2003–2005	guitars	The New Age of Terror (2004); Thrash 'Til Death (2006)
	Angelo Espino	2003–2005	bass	The New Age of Terror (2004); Thrash 'Til Death (2006)
	Dave Chedrick	2004–2005	drums	Thrash 'Til Death (2006)
	Lance Harrison	2006–2022	guitars	all Hirax releases from Assassins of War (2007) to Immortal Legacy (2014)
	Steve Harrison	2006–2022	bass	all Hirax releases from Assassins of War (2007) to Immortal Legacy (2014)
	Fabricio Ravelli	2006–2007; 2007–2008	drums	Assassins of War (2007); Chaos and Brutality (2007); Thrash & Destroy (2008); El Rostro de la Muerte (2009); Immortal Legacy (2014)
	Tim Thomas	2007–2008; 2011	guitars	Thrash & Destroy (2008)
	Mike Guerrero	2011–2013	guitars	"La Boca de la Bestia" (2012); "Hellion Rising" (2013)
	Mike Vega	2014–2022	drums	none
	Kelly McLauchlin	2018 (stand-in); 2019 (stand-in); 2023	bass	none
	Neil Metcalf	2022–2024	guitars	Faster than Death demo (2023); Faster than Death (2025)
	Chris Aguire II	2022–2023	bass	Faster than Death demo (2023)
	Francisco Zamudio	2022–2023	drums	none
	Danny Walker	2023–2024	drums	Faster than Death demo (2023); Faster than Death (2025)

== Lineups ==
Period	Members	Releases
February–June 1984	Katon W. De Pena — vocals; Gary Monardo — bass; Bob Savage — guitars; Brian Keith — drums	Hirax demo (1984)
June 1984–early 1986	Katon W. De Pena — vocals; Gary Monardo — bass; Scott Owen — guitars; Johnny Tabares — drums	Raging Violence (1985)
Early–summer 1986	Katon W. De Pena — vocals; Gary Monardo — bass; Scott Owen — guitars; Eric Brecht — drums	Hate, Fear and Power (1986)
Fall 1986	Gary Monardo — bass; Scott Owen — guitars; Eric Brecht — drums; Steve (surname unknown) — vocals	none
Late 1986–early 1987	Gary Monardo — bass; Scott Owen — guitars; Eric Brecht — drums; Paul Baloff — vocals	none
Early 1987	Scott Owen — guitars; Eric Brecht — drums; Billy Wedgeworth — vocals; Sherman Jones — bass	none
Summer 1987–1988	Scott Owen — guitars; Katon W. De Pena — vocals; Gary Monardo — bass; Johnny Tabares — drums	Blasted in Bangkok (1987)
Band inactive 1989–1999
Summer 2000	Scott Owen — guitars; Katon W. De Pena — vocals; Gary Monardo — bass; Johnny Tabares — drums	none
Fall/late 2000	Katon W. De Pena — vocals; Gary Monardo — bass; Johnny Tabares — drums; Greg Eickmier — guitars	El Diablo Negro (2000)
Early/spring 2001	Katon W. De Pena — vocals; James Joseph Hubler — guitars; Justin Lent — guitars; Shaun Ross — bass; Per Möller Jensen — drums	none
Summer 2001	Katon W. De Pena — vocals; James Joseph Hubler — guitars; Justin Lent — guitars, bass; Nick Seelinger — drums	Barrage of Noise (2001)
Fall 2001–early 2002	Katon W. De Pena — vocals; James Joseph Hubler — guitars; Mike Brickman — bass; Dan Bellinger — drums; Jim Durkin — guitars	none
Early–summer 2002	Katon W. De Pena — vocals; James Joseph Hubler — guitars; Mike Brickman — bass; Dan Bellinger — drums	none
Summer 2002–early 2003	Katon W. De Pena — vocals; Mike Brickman — bass; Dan Bellinger — drums; Roberto Carrero — guitars	Violent Assault Live (2002)
Early–late 2003	Katon W. De Pena — vocals; Mike Brickman — bass; Roberto Carrero — guitars; Jorge Iacobellis — drums; Glenn Rogers — guitars	Thrash 'Til Death (2006) — 2003 tracks
Late 2003–mid 2004	Katon W. De Pena — vocals; Jorge Iacobellis — drums; Glenn Rogers — guitars; Dave Watson — guitars; Angelo Espino — bass	The New Age of Terror (2004); Thrash 'Til Death (2006) — 2004 tracks
Mid 2004–November 2005	Katon W. De Pena — vocals; Glenn Rogers — guitars; Dave Watson — guitars; Angelo Espino — bass; Dave Chedrick — drums	Thrash 'Til Death (2006) — 2005 tracks
February–April 2006	Katon W. De Pena — vocals; Johnny Tabares — drums; Lance Harrison — guitars	none
April 2006–April 2007	Katon W. De Pena — vocals; Lance Harrison — guitars; Steve Harrison — bass; Glenn Rogers — guitars; Fabricio Ravelli — drums	Assassins of War (2007); Chaos and Brutality (2007)
April–September 2007	Katon W. De Pena — vocals; Lance Harrison — guitars; Steve Harrison — bass; Miguel Mona — drums	none
September 2007–early 2008	Katon W. De Pena — vocals; Lance Harrison — guitars; Steve Harrison — bass; Fabricio Ravelli — drums; Tim Thomas — guitars	Thrash & Destroy (2008)
Early–May 2008	Katon W. De Pena — vocals; Lance Harrison — guitars; Steve Harrison — bass; Fabricio Ravelli — drums; Glenn Rogers — guitars	El Rostro de la Muerte (2009)
May 2008–early 2011	Katon W. De Pena — vocals; Lance Harrison — guitars; Steve Harrison — bass; Glenn Rogers — guitars; Jorge Iacobellis — drums	El Rostro de la Muerte (2009)
Early–fall 2011	Katon W. De Pena — vocals; Lance Harrison — guitars; Steve Harrison — bass; Jorge Iacobellis — drums; Tim Thomas — guitars	First Time in Poland (2011)
Fall 2011–summer 2013	Katon W. De Pena — vocals; Lance Harrison — guitars; Steve Harrison — bass; Jorge Iacobellis — drums; Mike Guerrero — guitars	"La Boca de la Bestia" (2012); "Hellion Rising" (2013)
Summer 2013–early 2014	Katon W. De Pena — vocals; Lance Harrison — guitars; Steve Harrison — bass; Jorge Iacobellis — drums	Immortal Legacy (2014)
Early 2014–early 2022	Katon W. De Pena — vocals; Lance Harrison — guitars; Steve Harrison — bass; Mike Vega — drums	none
Early 2022–early 2023	Katon W. De Pena — vocals; Neil Metcalf — guitars; Chris Aguirre II — bass; Francisco Zamudio — drums	none
Early–summer 2023	Katon W. De Pena — vocals; Neil Metcalf — guitars; Chris Aguirre II — bass; Danny Walker — drums	Faster than Death demo (2023)
Summer 2023	Katon W. De Pena — vocals; Neil Metcalf — guitars; Danny Walker — drums; Kelly McLauchlin — bass	none
Late 2023–early 2024	Katon W. De Pena — vocals; Neil Metcalf — guitars, bass; Danny Walker — drums	Faster than Death (2025)
Early–summer 2024	Katon W. De Pena — lead vocals; Neil Metcalf — guitars; Jose Gonzalez — bass, backing vocals; Emilio Marquez — drums	none
Summer 2024–early 2025	Katon W. De Pena — lead vocals; Jose Gonzalez — bass, backing vocals; Emilio Marquez — drums; Allan Chan — guitars	none
Early–summer 2025	Katon W. De Pena — lead vocals; Jose Gonzalez — bass, backing vocals; Allan Chan — guitars; Mathew Morales — drums	none
Summer 2025–present	Katon W. De Pena — lead vocals; Jose Gonzalez — bass, backing vocals; Mathew Morales — drums; Geremi Perez — guitars, backing vocals	none to date
