= Noise Chaos War =

Compilation album by Hirax
- Released: 2010
- Genre: Thrash metal, speed metal, crossover thrash
- Label: Thrash Corner

Hirax chronology
El Rostro de la Muerte (2009)	Noise Chaos War (2010)	Immortal Legacy (2014)

Noise Chaos War is a compilation album by American thrash metal band Hirax. It contains three EPs in remastered format; Barrage of Noise (2000), Chaos and Brutality, and Assassins of War (2007). The song "Bombs of Death" is a live recorded video from a 2009 show in Japan.

== Track listing ==
Barrage of Noise EP

No.	Title	Length
1.	"Murder One"	2:49
2.	"Barrage of Noise"	0:58
3.	"Walk with Death"	4:44
4.	"Broken Neck"	1:55
5.	"Jade" (instrumental)	2:14
6.	"Mouth Sewn Shut"	3:05
7.	"Beyond the Church (Part 1)"	4:01
8.	"French Pearl" (instrumental)	2:39
Total length:		22:25

Chaos and Brutality EP

No.	Title	Length
1.	"Chaos and Brutality"	3:34
2.	"Walk With Death" (re-recorded)	3:24
3.	"100,000 Strong" (instrumental)	1:39
4.	"Lucifer's Inferno Reprise"	1:07
Total length:		9:44

Assassins of War EP

No.	Title	Length
1.	"Lucifer's Inferno"	3:10
2.	"Summon the Death Dealers"	6:43
3.	"City of the Dead"	4:31
4.	"Invasion"	2:24
5.	"Assassins of War"	4:36
6.	"Bombs of Death" (live video)
Total length:		21:24
