= Nena de Hiroshima =

Studio album by Todos Tus Muertos
- Released: 1991
- Recorded: Aguilar Studios, Buenos Aires 1991
- Genre: Punk rock Alternative rock
- Length: 30:59
- Label: Radio Tripoli; DBN
- Producer: Amilcar Gilabert

Todos Tus Muertos chronology
Todos Tus Muertos (1988)	Nena de Hiroshima (1991)	Dale Aborigen (1994)

Nena de Hiroshima is the second album by Argentine band Todos Tus Muertos released in 1991. This is the only album recorded for Radio Trípoli label.

== Overview ==
In 1989, when Horacio Villafañe left the band with Cristian Ruiz, Felix Gutiérrez chose guitarist Julio Amin, also appears Jorge Iacobellis on drums and executive producer. The album including "Break on Through" on Spanish, which was originally written and performed by The Doors.

Todos Tus Muertos presented the album in 1992, at the Roberto Pettinato ATC show, where they performed two songs: "Se que No" and "Incomunicado". That same year, the band played as opening act to the Ramones at the Obras Sanitarias stadium.

In 2001, DBN label reissued the album, and then in 2012 by the band label TTM records.

== Track listing ==
- All songs written by Jorge Serrano, except where noted.

=== Track listing LP ===
1. "Incomunicado" - 1:58
2. "Abre la Celda" (Gutiérrez, Nadal, Villafañe) - 3:00
3. "Se que No" (Gutiérrez, Nadal, Villafañe) - 3:58
4. "Terror Al Cambio" - 3:03
5. "Fallas" (Gutiérrez, Nadal) - 3:48
6. "El Ritmo de la Sangre" - 5:06
7. "El Espejo" - 4:17
8. "Break On Through" (Jim Morrison, Robby Krieger, Ray Manzarek, John Densmore) - 2:15
9. "El Chupadero" (Gutiérrez, Nadal, Villafañe) - 3:02

=== Track listing CD re-issue ===
1. "Incomunicado" - 1:58
2. "Abre la Celda" (Gutiérrez, Nadal, Villafañe) - 3:00
3. "Break On Through" (Jim Morrison, Robby Krieger, Ray Manzarek, John Densmore) - 2:14
4. "Terror Al Cambio" - 3:03
5. "Fallas" (Gutiérrez, Nadal) - 3:48
6. "El Ritmo de la Sangre" - 5:06
7. "Se que No" (Gutiérrez, Nadal, Villafañe) - 3:58
8. "El Espejo" - 4:15
9. "El Chupadero" (Gutiérrez, Nadal, Villafañe) - 3:02

== Personnel ==
Musicians

- Fidel Nadal - Lead Vocals.
- Julio Amin - Guitar.
- Felix Gutiérrez - Bass.
- Jorge Iacobellis - Drums.

Additional credit

- Jorge Iacobellis and Julio Amin - Executive producer.
- Fidel Nadal and Felix Gutiérrez - Design Cover.
- Jorge Iacobellis and Amilcar Gilabert - Production.
- Luis Guala - Photography.
