= Todos Tus Muertos (album) =

Studio album by Todos Tus Muertos
- Released: 1988
- Recorded: Panda Studios; March–April 1988
- Genre: Punk rock, Reggae fusion, Post-punk
- Length: 38:43
- Label: RCA; BMG
- Producer: Todos Tus Muertos; Mundy Epifanio

Todos Tus Muertos chronology
Todos Tus Muertos (1988)	Nena de Hiroshima (1990)

Todos Tus Muertos is the debut album by Argentine band Todos Tus Muertos released in 1988, and give them some successes needed to be known on a larger scale by taking them on tour in other countries.

== Background ==
The album is considered an artistic breakthrough for Todos Tus Muertos, being the first full-length release to consist entirely of the band. Horacio "Gamexane" played a variety of styles not usually associated with the mainstream rock music, with a darker sound and the gloomy lyrics along almost the entire album. Fidel Nadal played the kalimba on "Dieciocho Horas" and "Días de Escuela". Much of the music-style was still rooted in British post-punk and north-American hardcore punk.

Recorded at Panda Studios, Buenos Aires and produced by Carlos "Mundy" Epifanio. The biggest album's hit song is "Gente que No" (People who do not) song that was written with Jorge Serrano (when was part of the band). It was the only Todos Tus Muertos album to be recorded entirely to the RCA label. In 1997 DBN reissued the LP on CD.

== Track listing ==
- All songs written by Felix Gutierrez, Fidel Nadal and Horacio Villafañe, except where noted.

No.	Title	Length
1.	"El Féretro" (Nadal/Villafañe)	2:20
2.	"Demasiados Revueltos"	3:30
3.	"Diez Segundos de Masacre"	1:55
4.	"Turbulentas Tinieblas" (Gutierrez/Nadal)	1:30
5.	"¡A Combatir!"	2:27
6.	"Dieciocho Horas"	1:08
7.	"Días de Escuela" (Gutierrez/Nadal)	2:30
8.	"Gente que No" (Gutierrez/Nadal/Serrano/Villafañe)	2:00
9.	"Armas (Para la paz)"	5:15
10.	"No Más Apartheid"	3:20
11.	"Viejos de Mierda" (Gutierrez/Villafañe)	1:25
12.	"Más Majo que tu Status" (Villafañe)	3:18
13.	"Tango Traidor" (Gutierrez/Serrano)	3:41

== Personnel ==
Todos Tus Muertos

- Fidel Nadal - Lead vocals and Kalimba.
- Horacio "Gamexane" Villafañe - Lead guitar and backing vocals, Second vocals on "Más Majo que tu Status".
- Félix Gutierrez - Bass guitar and backing vocals, Lead vocals on "Viejos de Mierda".
- Cristian Ruiz - Drums.

Collaborators

- David Wrocklavsky - Keyboards.
- Sergio Rotman - Sax.

=== Additional credit ===
- Walter Chacon - Engineer.
- Felix Gutierrez and Andy Cherniavsky - Photography.
- Mundy Epifanio - Executive Producer.
- Horacio "Gamexane" Villafañe - Producer.
