= Lumumba (band) =

Lumumba was an Argentine reggae band created in the 90's by Fidel Nadal, his friend, Pablo Molina (both, formerly from Todos Tus Muertos) and his brother Amílcar Nadal. It was named after Patrice Lumumba (the first legally elected Prime Minister of the Congo). This project helped Fidel Nadal start his solo career.

In its short but productive history, it released 4 albums which met with approval by followers of reggae, but then it was dissolved. In 2000 the group split up and each of the members pursued their solo careers.

In 2014, after 14 years, the group confirmed their return with the three members. On Saturday July 19, 2014, Fidel, Pablo and Amílcar performed a live sold-out show at the Groove in Buenos Aires, and added a second show. With the success of their return, they decided to tour Latin America, which included trips throughout Argentina, Costa Rica, Mexico and Colombia.

In 2018, Lumumba released two new singles: "Aunk Aunk" and "Lejos de Mí".

== Discography ==
- Lumumba (1996)
- Raíces y Cultura (1997)
- Se Viene El Bum (1999)
- En Vivo (2000)
