= El Camino Real (Todos Tus Muertos album) =

Studio album by Todos Tus Muertos
- Released: 1998
- Recorded: Panda Studios, Buenos Aires; 1997
- Genre: Punk rock Reggae fusion Rapcore
- Length: 67:42
- Label: TTM Discos; Gora Herriak
- Producer: Todos Tus Muertos, Fernando Bocha Gutiérrez

Todos Tus Muertos chronology
Subversiones (1996)	El Camino Real (1998)	Re-Unión En Vivo (2007)

Professional ratings
Review scores
Source	Rating
Allmusic	2/5 stars

El Camino Real is the fifth studio album by Argentine band Todos Tus Muertos released in 1998. It is also Fidel Nadal's final full-length album with the band, preceding the announcement of the Todos Tus Muertos break-up in 2000. It was first TTM album distributed in Japan by Universal Music Group, and published by Polydor label.

== Background ==
It's considered the last chapter from Todos Tus Muertos first era. El Camino Real was recorded and produced at Panda Studios during largely 1997, by the band with Fernando Bocha Gutiérrez, the making of the album was an arduous process, largely because Fidel Nadal and Pablo Molina row began to convert to Rastafari during these sessions, and refused to perform punk rock music. Nadal was keenly aware of new styles and wanted to keep the current and experimental music like rap, hip hop, while Gamexane and Félix was seemingly more focused on the band's punk rock and reggae roots. As a result, there was friction, and the tension between the members would increase over the upcoming years.

== Track listing ==
Side A
No.	Title	Lyrics	Music	Length
1.	"Carne de cañón""	Nadal	Gutierrez/Villafañe	4:30
2.	"La gente que puso la sangre"	Nadal	Gutierrez/Villafañe/Potenzoni	3:00
3.	"Dignidad"	Nadal/Muguruza/Molina	Gutierrez/Villafañe/Potenzoni	5:15
4.	"Asesinos profesionales"	Nadal	Gutierrez	5:46
5.	"Los envidiosos"	Molina/Nadal	Gutierrez	2:52
6.	"Besos de seda"	Nadal	Gutierrez	4:40
7.	"El camino real"	Nadal/Molina	Gutierrez	2:49
8.	"Rasta vive"	Nadal/Molina	Villafañe/Potenzoni/Molina/Nadal/Gutierrez/Calegari	4:20
9.	"No te la vas a acabar"	Nadal	Villafañe/Potenzoni/Gutierrez	4:50
10.	"Todo lo daría"	Nadal/Chao	Chao	3:30
11.	"Te vamos a quemar"	Nadal/Gutierrez/Potenzoni	Villafañe/Potenzoni	4:10
12.	"Políticos"	Villafañe/Nadal	Gutierrez	2:50
13.	"Gringo Maldito"	Gutierrez	Nadal	3:21
14.	"Chekiraut!"	Nadal/Molina	Nadal	4:00
15.	"Jah Lion"	Nadal/Molina	Gutierrez/Villafañe/Potenzoni	5:20
16.	"La Casa Rosa"	Nadal	Gutierrez/Villafañe/Potenzoni	4:00
Total length:				67:42

== Personnel ==
Todos Tus Muertos

- Fidel Nadal - Lead vocals.
- Pablo Molina - Vocals and Percussion.
- Horacio "Gamexane" Villafañe - Lead Guitar and Backing vocals, Second vocals on "Politicos".
- Félix Gutierrez - Bass guitar and Backing vocals.
- Pablo Pontezoni - Drums.

Collaborators

- Willy Calegari - Keyboards.
- Sergio Rotman - Sax.
- Fermin Muguruza - Vocals on "Dignidad" and "Te vamos a quemar".
- Jason - Trumpet and Trombone on "Asesinos profesionales", "Besos de seda" and "Jah Lion".
- Martín "La Mosca" Lorenzo - Percussion on "El camino real", "Te vamos a quemar" and "La casa rosa".
- Sergio Arrastia - Percussion on "No te la vas a acabar".
- Lickle Roxie - Vocals on "No te la vas a acabar".
- Cristian Aldana - Guitar on "Políticos".

=== Additional credit ===
- Richard Trollo - Engineer.
- Mario Altamirano - Engineer.
- Fito Keller - Photography.
- Fernando Bocha Gutiérrez - Executive Producer.
- TTM - Design.
