= Leather Charm =

American hard rock band

- Origin: Downey, California, U.S.
- Genres: Hard rock; heavy metal
- Years active: 1981
- Spinoffs: Metallica
- Past members: James Hetfield; Ron McGovney; Hugh Tanner; Troy James; Jim Mulligan

Leather Charm was an American heavy metal band from Downey, California, noteworthy as a forerunner to Metallica. The group rehearsed new wave of British heavy metal covers and original material for a period of months in 1981.

== History ==
Leather Charm was formed in June 1981 following the demise of Phantom Lord, a garage band featuring James Hetfield and guitarist Hugh Tanner. At the time, Hetfield was living with an older half-brother in Brea, California and attending Brea Olinda High School after the unforeseen death of his mother. In the new band, Hetfield and Tanner were joined by Hetfield's childhood friend and roommate Ron McGovney, and later drummer Jim Mulligan. While Hetfield had played guitar in Phantom Lord, he acted solely as lead vocalist in Leather Charm. Tanner was replaced several months later by guitarist Troy James.

The group was influenced by the new wave of British heavy metal and practiced covers of songs by such bands of the period, including Diamond Head and Sweet Savage. They were also influenced by Iron Maiden and covered their songs "Remember Tomorrow" and "Wrathchild".

When Mulligan left the group in late 1981, Leather Charm disbanded and Hetfield began working with drummer Lars Ulrich on a new band, Metallica. Early the next year, McGovney and guitarist Dave Mustaine completed Metallica's first gigging lineup. The Leather Charm song "Hit the Lights" was integrated into the band's set among the first original compositions in the band's repertoire, and eventually became the opening track on their debut album, Kill 'Em All.

== Sources ==
- Doughton, K.J. Metallica Unbound: The Unofficial Biography. First Edition. Time-Warner Books, 1993. Pages 16–17
