= James Hetfield =

American musician (born 1963)

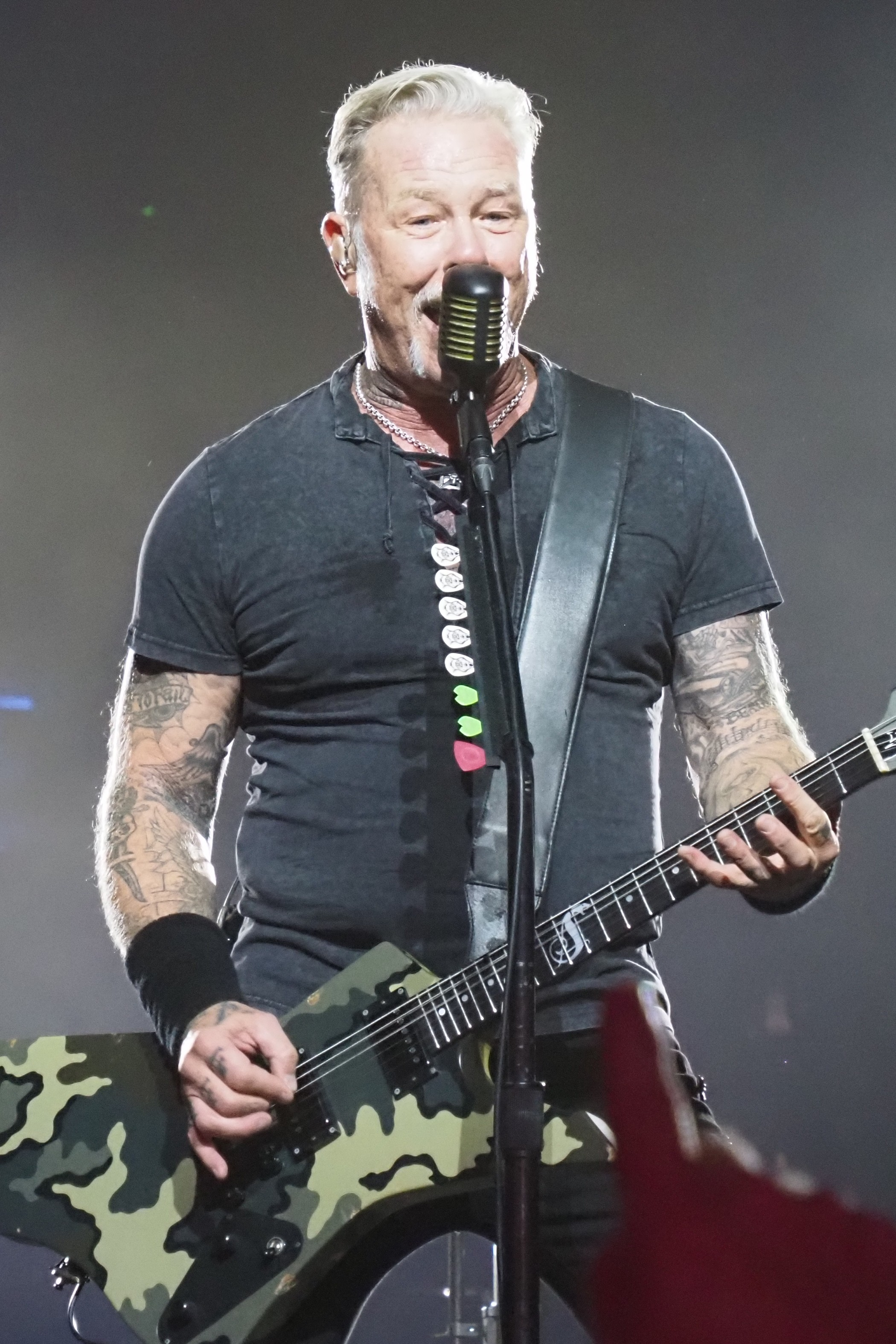
- Hetfield performing with Metallica in 2025
- Born: James Alan Hetfield; August 3, 1963 (age 63); Downey, California, US
- Occupations: Musician; singer; songwriter
- Years active: 1978–present
- Spouse: Francesca Tomasi (m. 1997; div. 2022)
- Partner(s): Adriana Gillett (2023–present; engaged)
- Children: 3
- Musical career
- Genres: Heavy metal; thrash metal; hard rock
- Instruments: Guitar; vocals
- Member of: Metallica
- Formerly of: Spastik Children; Leather Charm

James Alan Hetfield (born August 3, 1963) is an American musician. He is the lead vocalist, rhythm guitarist, co-founder, and a primary songwriter of heavy metal band Metallica. He is mainly known for his raspy voice and intricate rhythm playing, but occasionally performs lead guitar duties and solos both live and in studio. Hetfield co-founded Metallica in October 1981 after answering an advertisement by drummer Lars Ulrich in the Los Angeles newspaper The Recycler. Metallica has won 10 Grammy Awards and released 11 studio albums, three live albums, four extended plays, and 24 singles. Hetfield is often regarded as one of the greatest rhythm guitar players of all time.

In 2009, Hetfield was ranked at No. 8 in Joel McIver's book The 100 Greatest Metal Guitarists and No. 24 by Hit Parader on their list of the 100 Greatest Metal Vocalists of All Time. In Guitar World's poll, Hetfield was placed as the 19th greatest guitarist of all time, as well as being placed second (along with Metallica lead guitarist Kirk Hammett) in The 100 Greatest Metal Guitarists poll of the same magazine. Rolling Stone placed him along with bandmate Kirk Hammett as the 23rd greatest guitarist of all time.

== Early life ==
Hetfield was born on August 3, 1963, in Downey, California, the son of Cynthia Bassett (née Nourse), a light opera singer, and Virgil Lee Hetfield, a truck driver. He is of English, German, Irish, and Scottish descent. He has two older half-brothers from his mother's first marriage and one younger sister. His parents divorced in 1976 when Hetfield was 13. They were strict Christian Scientists, and in accordance with their beliefs, they strongly disapproved of medicine or any other medical treatment and remained loyal to their faith, even as Cynthia was dying from cancer. This upbringing became the inspiration for many of Hetfield's lyrics during his career with Metallica, most notably in the songs "Dyers Eve" and "The God That Failed" from ...And Justice for All and Metallica, respectively. Cynthia died of cancer in February 1980, when Hetfield was 16 years old. After the death of his mother, Hetfield went to live with his older half-brother David. Virgil died in early 1996, before the release of Metallica's Load. Hetfield attended Downey High School for his freshman and sophomore years and graduated from Brea Olinda High School in 1981.

Hetfield was nine years old when he first began piano lessons, after which he took on his half-brother David's drums and finally, at the age of 14, he began to play guitar with Robert Okner. He was also in a few bands as a teenager – one being Leather Charm, and another, Obsession. Hetfield identifies Aerosmith as having been his main musical influence as a child, and has said they were the reason he wanted to play guitar.

== Career ==
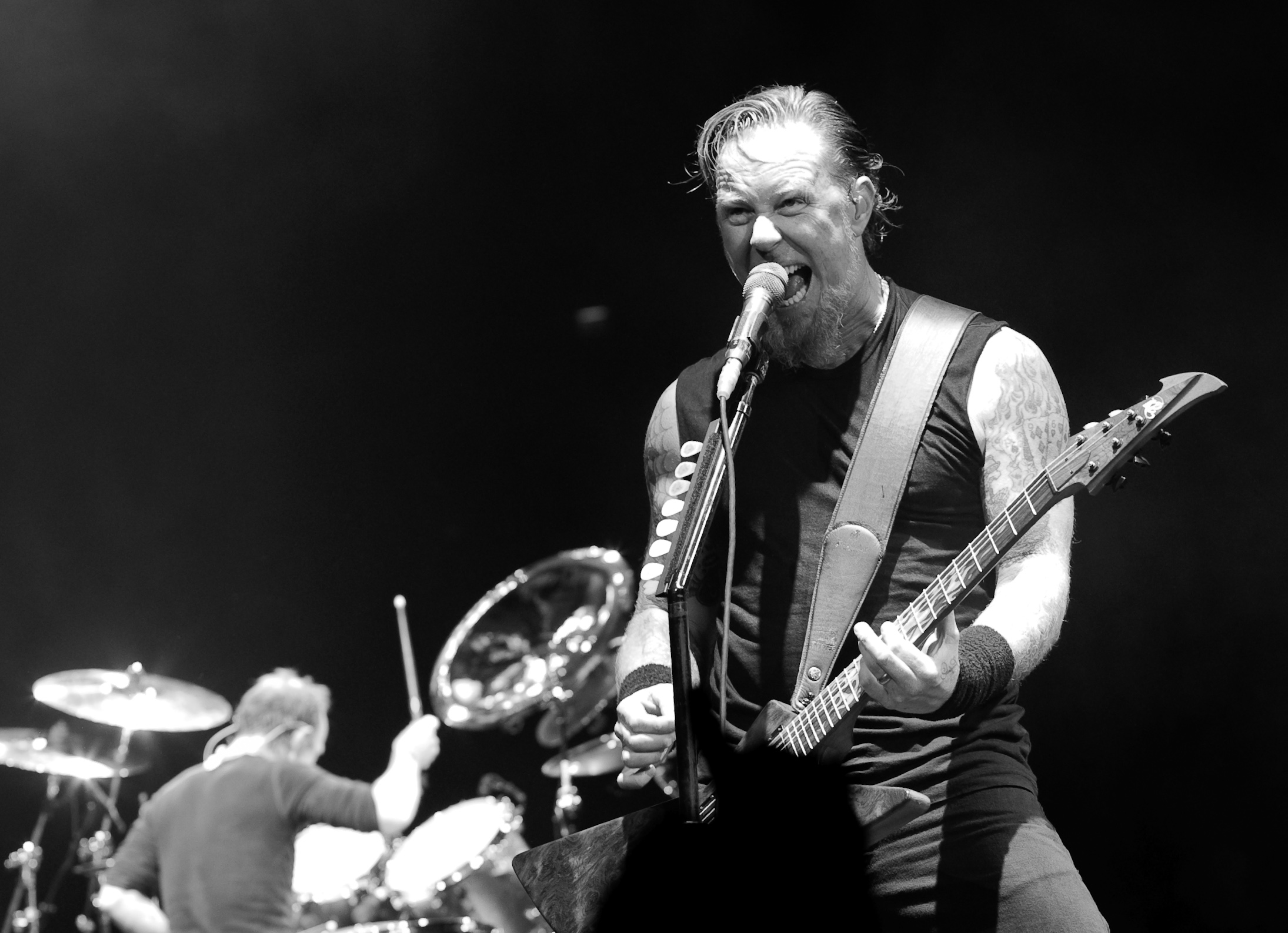
Hetfield in 2008

In the early days of the band, Metallica experimented with a few different vocal and guitar combinations, essentially creating a setup similar to that of British metal band Diamond Head, another major influence on Hetfield. Some of the options considered included adding another guitar player, having John Roads play lead guitar, as well as asking John Bush from Armored Saint (who later joined Anthrax) to sing for the band. The finalized lineup of the band became Hetfield (lead vocals and rhythm guitar), Lars Ulrich (drums), Dave Mustaine (lead guitar), and Ron McGovney (bass), who was soon replaced by Cliff Burton. Hetfield referred to their early sound as power metal. The term "thrash metal" was first used when Kerrang journalist Malcolm Dome described the Anthrax song "Metal Thrashing Mad" in an issue of Kerrang in February 1984.

From 1982 to 1983, Mustaine's aggressive behavior and drinking problems led to mounting tensions between himself and Hetfield. Mustaine once poured beer onto McGovney's bass. On April 1, 1983, the band recruited lead guitarist Kirk Hammett from the band Exodus, and 10 days later, Hetfield and Ulrich officially fired Mustaine from the band due to his erratic indifference. Mustaine was sent home on a four-day bus journey from New York to Los Angeles, and went on to form the heavy metal band Megadeth.

Since the recording of Load, Hammett has been recording rhythm guitars as well. Hetfield occasionally plays guitar solos on songs such as "Nothing Else Matters", "My Friend of Misery", "Just a Bullet Away", the outro solo on "The Outlaw Torn", the second solo on "To Live Is to Die", the first solo on "Suicide and Redemption", the first solo on "Master of Puppets", and the harmonized solo on " Orion". He also writes the majority of the guitar harmonies, as well as writing the lyrics, vocal melodies, and co-arranging the songs with Ulrich.

Hetfield was involved in an on-stage accident at Olympic Stadium in Montreal during the Guns N' Roses/Metallica Stadium Tour on August 8, 1992. During the song "Fade to Black", a pyrotechnic charge reacted. Hetfield's guitar protected him from the full force of the blast, but it struck his left side, burning his hand, arm, eyebrows, face and hair. He suffered second and third-degree burns, but was back on stage 17 days later, although his guitar duties were delegated to former guitar tech and Metal Church guitarist John Marshall for four weeks while he made a full recovery.

Hetfield also suffered a broken arm a number of times while skateboarding, which prevented him from playing guitar on stage, and subsequently caused Hetfield's management company, Q Prime, to put a clause in Hetfield's contract forbidding him to ride a skateboard while Metallica was touring. During a live performance on tour for Metallica, Hetfield experienced complications with his vocals after performing a cover of the Anti-Nowhere League song "So What?", forcing him to take vocal lessons for the first time. He did basic warm-up exercises to piano keys with his vocal coach, who also gave him a cassette tape of the piano warm-up for future use. Hetfield still uses the same cassette he was given in the early 1990s to this day before any live performance or any recording Metallica does. Hetfield talks about his vocal training endeavors in the Metallica documentary film, Metallica: Some Kind of Monster, produced and directed by Joe Berlinger and Bruce Sinofsky.

During the recording of the band's eighth studio album St. Anger in 2001, Hetfield went into rehab to address his alcohol usage. He rejoined the band after seven months in rehab and four months recovering with his family. His health problems are featured in Some Kind of Monster. Some Kind of Monster also shows the making of the St. Anger album, and documents the various conflicts and issues the band were facing at the time including the departure of Jason Newsted, alcoholism, family commitments, and the future of the band.

Hetfield and Metallica recruited Ozzy Osbourne bassist Robert Trujillo. Osbourne replaced him with Jason Newsted shortly after Trujillo's transfer. The new lineup has continued to make music and tour worldwide. Metallica's ninth studio album, Death Magnetic, was released on September 12, 2008. Like St. Anger and every album of original material released by Metallica since 1991's Metallica, Death Magnetic went to #1 on the Billboard charts in over 30 countries during its first week of release.

On April 4, 2009, Hetfield, along with remaining Metallica members Ulrich, Hammett, Trujillo, as well as former bassist Newsted, and the deceased Cliff Burton (who was represented by his father), were inducted into the Rock and Roll Hall of Fame. In an interview after their nomination, Hetfield commented that everyone who had appeared on an album with the band would be inducted. This excluded original guitarist Dave Mustaine and original bassist Ron McGovney, as both had appeared only on the band's early demo tapes. Hetfield and the rest of Metallica, including Newsted, performed "Master of Puppets" and "Enter Sandman" to end the ceremony.

== Playing style ==
Hetfield has been called "The King of Downpicking" for his right-hand picking speed by Annihilator guitarist Jeff Waters. He has explained he holds the pick with his thumb, index and middle fingers, rather than just the thumb and index, citing additional stability he gains by it.

== Personal life ==
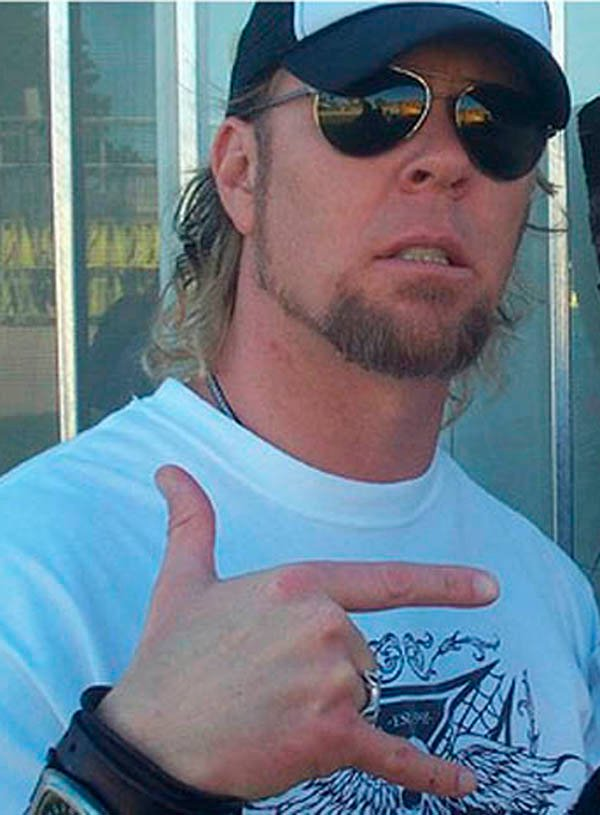
Hetfield backstage at the Big Day Out 2004

Hetfield married Francesca Tomasi on August 17, 1997. Together they have three children, one of which, Castor, is also a musician, playing for the Savannah, Georgia-based band Bastardane as their drummer. As of 2016, Hetfield resided in Vail, Colorado, citing a "multitude of reasons" for moving there, including it being Tomasi's childhood hometown, the natural beauty, and the quiet environment. During an interview on NPR's Fresh Air, Hetfield stated that Tomasi helped him to mature and learn to deal with his anger issues more constructively, explaining that after they met, his destructive tendencies embarrassed both of them. Hetfield filed for divorce in 2022, citing irreconcilable differences. He is currently engaged to Adriana Gillett.

Hetfield enjoys a variety of activities, most notably hunting; farming and beekeeping; customizing cars and motorcycles in his garage; watching the Las Vegas Raiders, the San Francisco Giants, and the San Jose Sharks; and attending hot rod shows. He put his 1968 Chevrolet Camaro up for sale on eBay, with the proceeds going to a Music for Schools program. The car was used in the video for "I Disappear" and was given to him as a gift upon the video's completion. "Slowburn", his 1936 Auburn boat tail speedster, won the 2010 Goodguys West Coast Custom of the Year.

Hetfield has a number of tattoos, including one which shows flames encasing four playing cards – ace (1), 9, 6, and 3 – representing the year of his birth, and the words "Carpe Diem" ("seize the day"). The flames on the tattoo are in reference to the pyrotechnic accident which he suffered in 1992 during a concert in Montreal. He has tattooed an "M" and "81" on his right hand for "Metallica" and the year Metallica was founded, 1981, and an "F" on his left hand for "Francesca", which has since been turned into "Forgiven". He also has some Christian tattoos, including crosses and one of Jesus on his right arm. He has a tattoo of two razors forming the straight edge X symbol on his left wrist.

The first single Hetfield ever bought was "Sweet Home Alabama" by Lynyrd Skynyrd. He was featured in a documentary called Absent, directed by Justin Hunt, which takes a look at the effects of absent fathers on their children and the "father wound" that they leave behind.

=== Health ===
Hetfield has struggled with substance abuse and addiction at various points throughout his life. In 2001, he entered a rehab program (documented in the film Metallica: Some Kind of Monster), and by early 2002, he began maintaining total abstinence from alcohol. In a 2010 interview with So What!, the official magazine of Metallica's fan club, Hetfield stated that he is a "reborn straight edge". However, in 2019, Hetfield once again entered rehab, forcing Metallica to cancel their Australia/New Zealand leg of the WorldWired Tour. Hetfield made his first public appearance since leaving rehab at the Petersen Automotive Museum reception on January 30, 2020.

=== Political views ===
Hetfield has expressed his disdain for politics and celebrities who "soapbox their opinions", stating that "for us, people are people – you should all have your own opinion". Hetfield reaffirmed his disdain at a concert in October 2026, when he criticized musicians that promote their political beliefs to their live audiences.

In 2007, Metallica performed at London's Live Earth concert. When Hetfield was asked for his thoughts on climate change, he responded by saying:

I really avoided the press around the Live Earth day. I didn't quite agree with what was going on there. Politics drive me crazy, and I don't like talking politics. Politics get in the way of things; they get in the way of getting things done, and getting our music across is what we wanna do – we don't wanna cloud it with Democrat, Republican, whatever. Our philosophy is 'think for yourself' at the end of the day – do what you think feels right. I really believe that humans will survive. I have a lot of faith in mankind that we will overcome and adapt – whatever it is; whether it's man-made or God-made, or Earth/Mother Nature – we have a lot of smart people on this planet that will make something good out of bad.

In 2008, responding to the use of Metallica's music to torture Iraqi prisoners, Hetfield was unoffended and replied, "If the Iraqis aren't used to freedom, then I'm glad to be part of their exposure." British band Chumbawamba subsequently released a song called "Torturing James Hetfield" in response. In a 2017 interview, Hetfield reaffirmed his previous stance, saying, "I'm honored my country is using something to help us stay safe, if they are. But then again, once the music is out, I don't have control over that. Just like how someone's giving it away online. They're using it to do what they do."

== Equipment ==
=== Guitars ===
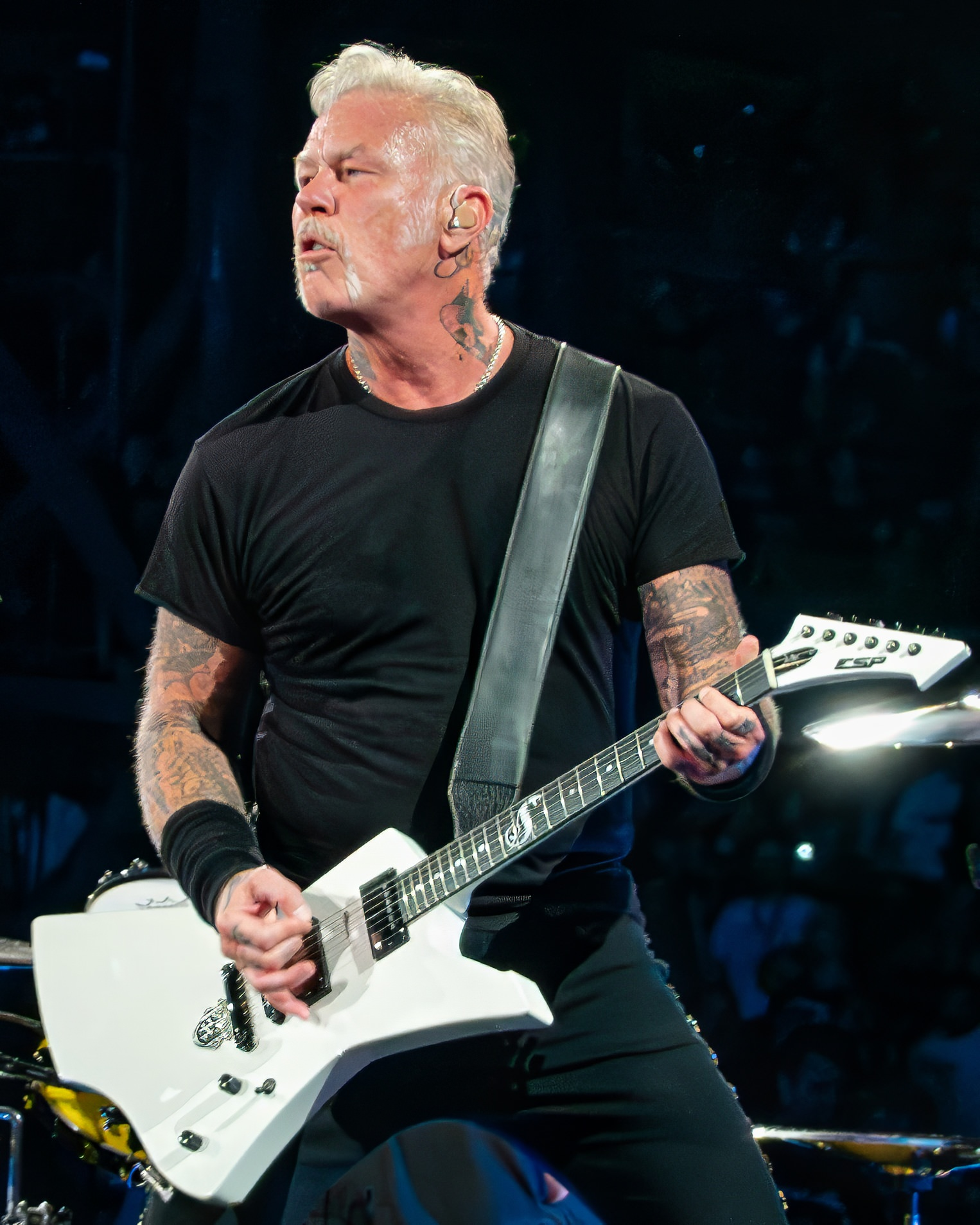
Hetfield playing an ESP guitar in 2024

Hetfield has been a major endorser of ESP Guitars since the 1980s, and is best known for playing custom-made Explorer-style guitars with an EMG 81/EMG 60 set for pickups and since then he has his own signature EMG JH pickups. Hetfield's main guitar from the early days was a Flying V copy made in Japan by Electra, which was modified with a Seymour Duncan Invader (SH-8) pickup and used almost exclusively until 1984 when he switched to the Gibson Explorer model.

During the mid-1990s, ESP produced the first of his signature model guitars. To date, Hetfield has had six signature guitars with the company. However, Hetfield often uses guitars from Gibson and other companies instead of ESP despite his endorsement.

Some of Hetfield's guitars over the years have included:

| Date purchased | Guitar & "motto" | Note | Ref(s) |
|---|---|---|---|
| Unknown | Gibson SG Standard (1969 model) | Hetfield purchased the guitar from a mutual member of the schools jazz band. | |
| 1980 | Electra Flying V | Purchased for $200 in 1980 and used on Kill 'Em All. Broke in 1984 and restored in 2008. | |
| 1984 | Gibson Explorer – "So What" | First used on Ride the Lightning. Also restored in 2008 for the Death Magnetic album. | |
| 1984 | Gibson Explorer – "More Beer" | Hetfield's back-up guitar from 1984 to 1988. | |
| 1985 | Jackson King V Custom – "Kill Bon Jovi" | Used during the recording of Master of Puppets and sporadically during the Damage, Inc. Tour in 1986/87. | |
| 1987 | ESP MX220 – "Eet Fuk" | Hetfield's first ESP and used during the And Justice For All period. | |
| 1987 | ESP MX220 – "So Fucking What" | As with his Gibson Explorer – "More Beer", this was Hetfield's back-up to the ESP MX220 – "Eet Fuk" model. | |
| 1988 | ESP MX220 – "Fuk Em Up" | Hetfield purchased his 3rd ESP in 1988 and while identical to his previous two guitars, this model was all black. | |
| Unknown | ESP Explorer Double Neck | Hetfield used this guitar during live performances of Fade to Black and can be seen during the music video for the song. | |
| Unknown | Gibson EDS-1275 Double Neck | Seen during the music video for Nothing Else Matters. Like a stock guitar. | |
| Unknown | Danelectro/Coral Electric Sitar | Hetfield used this during the recording of Wherever I May Roam from the Black Album. | |
| 1996 | ESP MX250 – "Elk Skull" | Used during the Load period as one of his main live guitars and was painted by artist Dino Muradian. | |
| 1996 | Ken Lawrence Explorer | Custom-made by Ken Lawrence, Hetfield is known to have more than one including a double-neck model. | |
| 1996 | ESP Flying V JH-1 | Designed and built by Matt Masciandaro, Hetfield had two of these guitars. One had red flames, the other one had green. | |
| 1996 | ESP JH-2 | Essentially a port over from his previous guitars, Hetfield's again had two different versions. | |
| 1996 | Fender Telecaster '52 Reissue with B-Bender | A mid 1990s reissue of the 1952 Fender Telecaster, this guitar was used to record the intro on "The Unforgiven II". | |
| 1998 | ESP Eclipse Custom/JH-3 | With artwork designed by Hetfield, all the hardware is gold-plated and the guitar is still used live occasionally. | |
| Unknown | 1963 Gibson SG/Les Paul Standard | A gift from Bob Rock, Hetfield used this guitar in the "Turn the Page" music video. | |
| 2003 | Gibson Explorer – "Rusty" | This guitar was used during the St. Anger era, both in the studio as well as on tour. | |
| Unknown | Gibson Les Paul Custom | Also used around the St. Anger period, this guitar was manufactured in 1973. | |
| Unknown | LTD H-307 | This guitar was used to record Some Kind of Monster. | |
| Unknown | ESP/LTD Baritone Viper – "The Grynch" | Black with green flames, this guitar was used live for songs with Drop D tuning. | |
| Unknown | ESP Truckster | Released in 2008, this ESP guitar was another Hetfield signature model. | |
| Unknown | ESP Iron Cross | This guitar has been used live extensively since 2008 and is inspired by his 1973 Gibson Les Paul. | |
| Unknown | ESP/LTD Snakebyte | A recent Hetfield addition, it is equipped with a set of James Hetfield signature pickups. | |
| 2016 | ESP Vulture | Hetfield has been using this guitar since 2016 and it can be seen on their Instagram and YouTube channels. | |

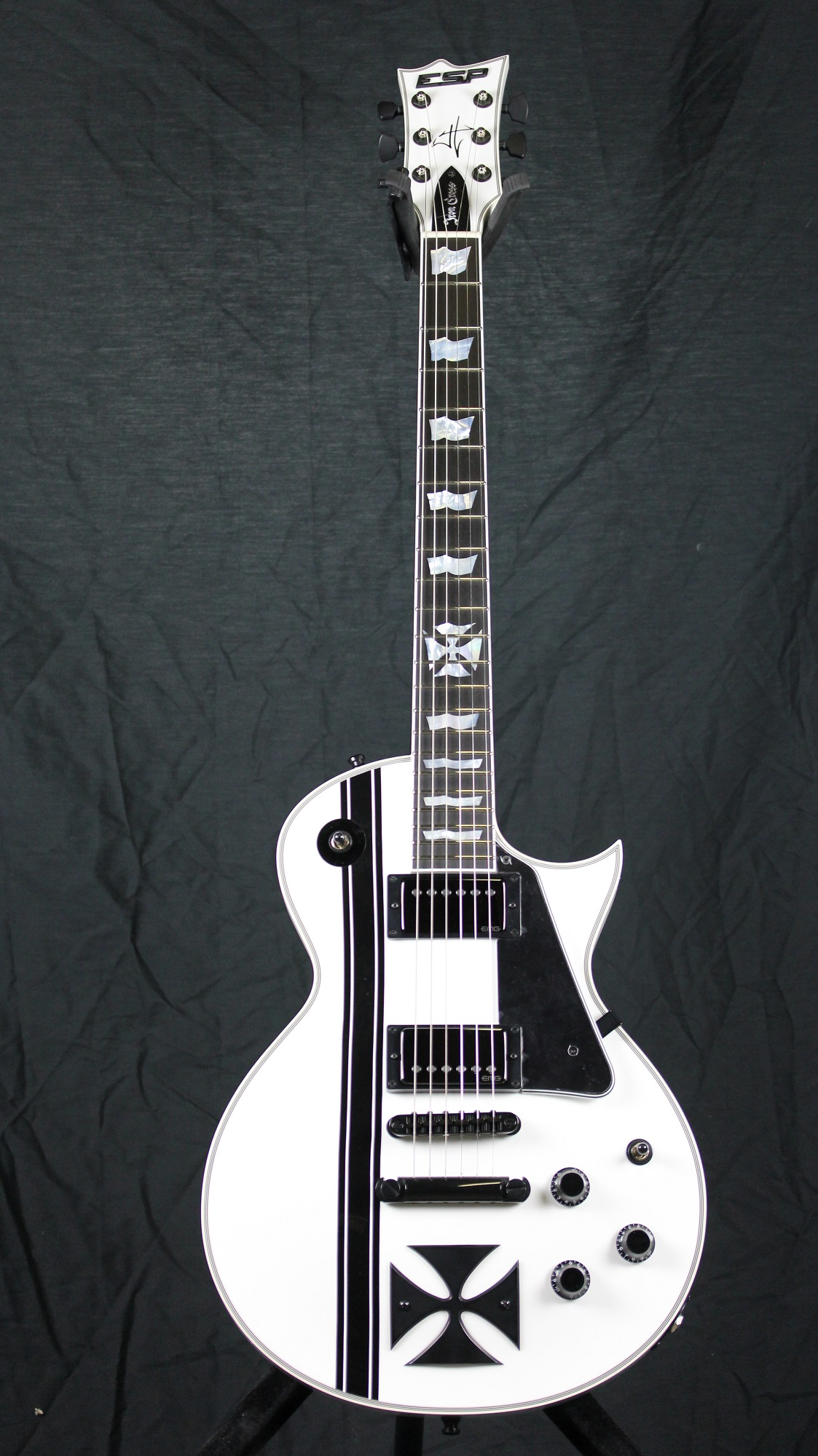
ESP Iron Cross Snow White James Hetfield Signature

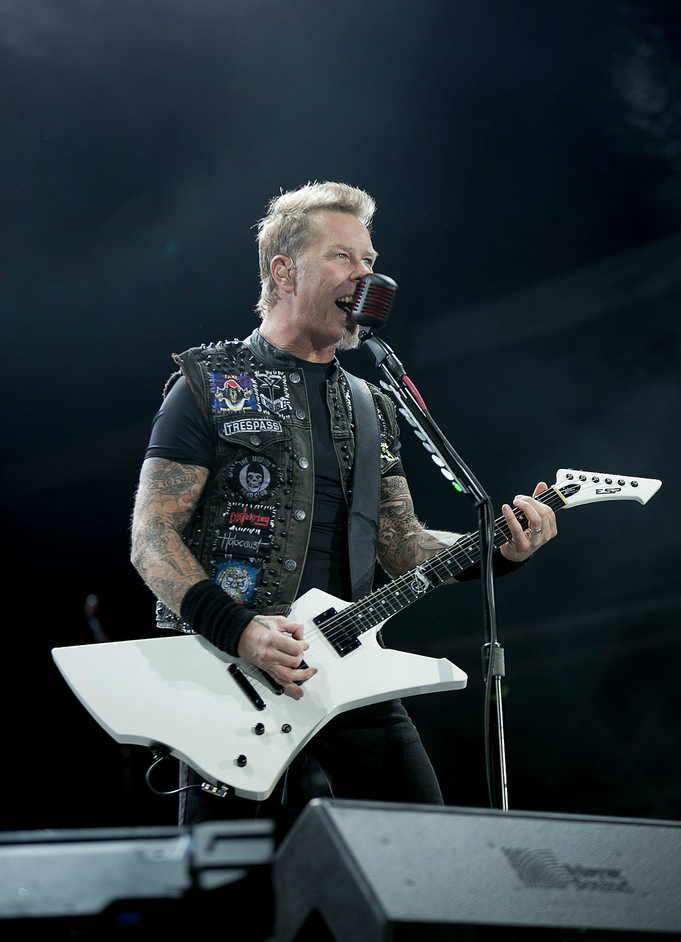
Playing the ESP/LTD Snakebyte

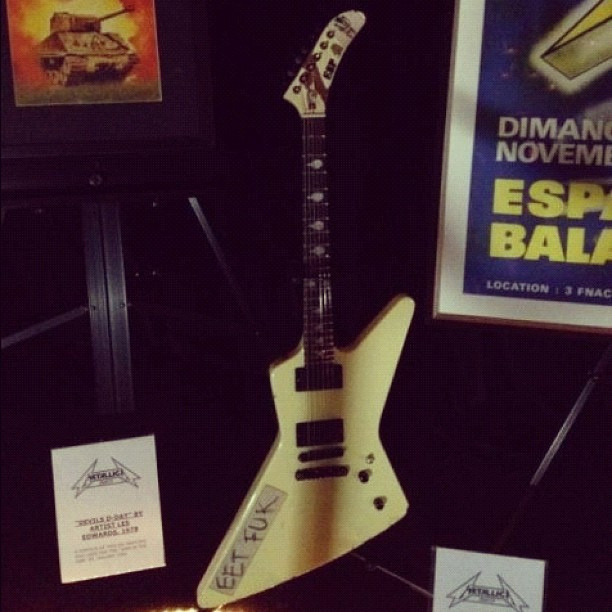
Eet Fuk Guitar

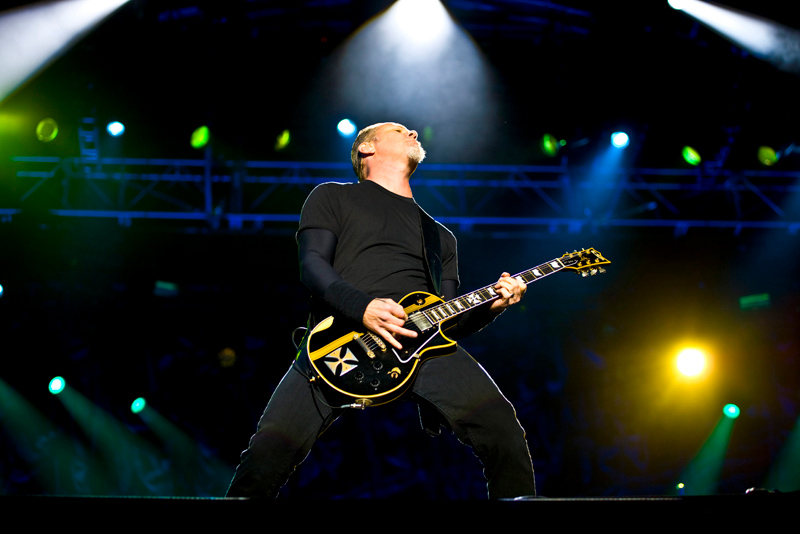
A yellow and black Iron Cross

=== Amplifiers and cabinets ===
Throughout Metallica's career, Hetfield has used a wide range of amplifiers. For the first two albums, he used Marshall heads and cabinets, with occasional effects. The specific Marshall that he used for Kill 'Em All was stolen after a concert prior to the recording of Ride the Lightning; Hetfield was upset by the theft, as his mother had helped him purchase the amplifier before her death. In 1985, for the recording of Master of Puppets, he and Kirk Hammett each bought a Mesa/Boogie Mark IIC+ amplifier (the preamp sections of which were connected to Marshall power amplifiers), and since then he has mostly used Mesa/Boogies, including the Triaxis and Rectifier models. Around the time of St. Anger, Hetfield began using the Diezel VH4 head. The majority of his clean tones come from a Roland Jazz Chorus, although many different amplifiers have been used over the years.

In December 2011, Fortin Amps announced that they would team up with Randall Amplifiers to start a new line of tube amplifiers based on the Fortin Meathead amplifier. Kirk Hammett currently has two prototypes, and Hetfield will eventually be receiving one.

The amplifiers currently used on tour by Hetfield are:

- Mesa/Boogie TriAxis preamp (x4)
- Mesa/Boogie Simul-Class 2:90 power amp (x2)
- Mesa/Boogie Triple Rectifier heads
- Diezel VH4 heads
- Mesa/Boogie 4x12 cabinets with Celestion V30 speakers in isolation cabinets
- Roland JC-120 combo amplifiers

=== Effects ===
To avoid problems with pedals being damaged during live performances, Hetfield keeps his effect pedals in a rack along with his amplifiers, and his guitar technician controls them through a pedalboard sidestage. The pedal controller allows him to change between different effect pedals and amplifiers.

Hetfield's live rig in 2008 included:

- TC Electronic G-Major
- Line 6 DM4
- Mesa/Boogie Custom Graphic EQ
- MXR Phase 100
- ATI NanoAmp SUM 100
- Klon Centaur
- Boss NS-2 Noise Suppressor
- Voodoo Lab Ground Control Pro
- Voodoo Lab GCX Audio Switcher (x2)
- Voodoo Lab Pedal Power 2 Plus
- DBX 1074 Quad Gate
- Behringer Multigate Pro

In 2010, a Line 6 effects unit was added to the list, along with the TC Electronic unit, perhaps indicating that this had replaced his stompboxes.

=== Accessories ===
- Ernie Ball Power Slinky strings (.11–.48)
- Dunlop James Hetfield Black Fang 1.14 mm picks
- 3" Levy's Straps
- Peterson Strobe 420 Tuner
- EMG JH Het Set
- Shure UR-4D Wireless Equipment
- Furman AR Pro Power Conditioner

In addition, Hetfield uses Shure Super 55 microphones for vocals.

== Discography ==
=== Metallica ===
- Kill 'Em All (1983)
- Ride the Lightning (1984)
- Master of Puppets (1986)
- ...And Justice for All (1988)
- Metallica (1991)
- Load (1996)
- Reload (1997)
- St. Anger (2003)
- Death Magnetic (2008)
- Hardwired... to Self-Destruct (2016)
- 72 Seasons (2023)

== Filmography ==
Film
| Year | Title | Role | Notes | Ref(s) |
|---|---|---|---|---|
| 1992 | A Year and a Half in the Life of Metallica | Himself | Documentary film | |
| 2004 | Metallica: Some Kind of Monster | Himself | Documentary film | |
| 2006 | The Darwin Awards | Himself | Feature film | |
| 2013 | Metallica: Through the Never | Himself | Concert film | |
| 2019 | Extremely Wicked, Shockingly Evil and Vile | Bob Hayward | Feature film | |
| 2024 | The Thicket | Simon Deasy | Feature film | |

Television
| Year | Title | Role | Notes | Ref(s) |
|---|---|---|---|---|
| 1996 | Space Ghost Coast to Coast | Himself | Episode: "Jacksonville" | |
| 1998–2001 | Behind the Music | Himself | 2 episodes | |
| 2004 | Dave the Barbarian | Chino (voice) | Episode: "Here There Be Dragons" | |
| 2006 | Metalocalypse | Various characters (voice) | 4 episodes | |
| 2006 | The Simpsons | Himself (voice) | Episode: "The Mook, the Chef, the Wife and Her Homer" | |
| 2009 | Time Warp | Himself | Episode: "Heavy Metal, Motorcross and Chain Saws" | |
| 2013 | Behind the Music: Remastered | Himself | Episode: "Motörhead" | |
| 2014 | The Hunt | Narrator | Season 1 | |
| 2016 | American Dad! | Water Polo Coach (voice) | Episode: "The Life Aquatic with Steve Smith" | |
| 2016 | Billions | Himself | Episode: "Short Squeeze" | |
| 2016–2018 | Skylanders Academy | Wolfgang (voice) | Recurring role | |
| 2025 | Beavis and Butt-Head | Himself (voice) | Episode: "Nacho Shake" | |

== Guest appearances ==
=== On stage ===
- Hetfield sang "Baby Hold On" at the Eddie Money Tribute Concert on February 23, 2020, in Beverly Hills.
- Hetfield sang "Stone Cold Crazy" at the Freddie Mercury Tribute Concert, accompanied by the remaining members of Queen and Tony Iommi on rhythm guitar.
- Hetfield performed at the Outlaws Concert in 2004, alongside Hank Williams Jr., Cowboy Troy, Big & Rich, Gretchen Wilson, and Kid Rock. Hetfield played one of close friend Waylon Jennings's songs, "Don't You Think This Outlaw Bit's Done Got Out of Hand", the very same he recorded on the tribute album to Jennings, I've Always Been Crazy. At this same event, he performed Metallica's "Mama Said" with Jennings' widow Jessi Colter, though this was cut from the television broadcast.
- Hetfield appeared onstage with Alice in Chains on June 2, 2006, at Rock am Ring, singing deceased vocalist Layne Staley's parts on the song "Would?". He again appeared with Alice in Chains to perform "Would?" when they played at The Warfield in San Francisco on November 26, 2006.
- On November 17, 2000, Hetfield was at a Misfits concert accompanied by his body guard at Maritime Hall in San Francisco, where he eventually got up on the stage and sang "Last Caress", then "Die, Die My Darling" whilst being accompanied by the band.

=== Musical collaborations ===
- Hetfield provided backing vocals on "Man or Ash" on the Corrosion of Conformity album Wiseblood.
- Hetfield sang backing vocals on "Twist of Cain" and "Possession" on Danzig's debut album Danzig.
- Hetfield played guitar on "Eclectic Electric" from the Primus album Antipop.
- Hetfield performed guest vocals on "Drivin' Rain" on the Gov't Mule album The Deep End, Volume 2 and on the soundtrack NASCAR on Fox: Crank It Up (2002).
- Hetfield performed guest vocals on the Heart song "Beautiful Broken" from their album of the same name which was released on July 8, 2016.

=== Film ===
Though previously believed to have been sung by Trey Parker, the song "Hell Isn't Good" from the film South Park: Bigger, Longer and Uncut was actually sung by Hetfield. He admitted to doing so in 2000, confirming what many Hetfield fans had already recognized as his trademark growling style.

=== Television ===
- Hetfield appears in the Celebrity Deathmatch episode "The Battle of the Heavy Metal Maniacs", in which he fights Limp Bizkit vocalist Fred Durst.
- In 2017, Hetfield narrated the documentary Addicted to Porn.

=== Music videos ===
A photo of Hetfield appears in Rammstein's music video "Haifisch".

=== Video games ===
- James Hetfield appears as a playable character in Tony Hawk's Pro Skater HD.
- James Hetfield appears as a cosmetic outfit in Fortnite.
