= Phantasm (metal band) =

American thrash metal band

- Origin: Los Angeles, California, U.S.
- Genres: Thrash metal; crossover thrash; hardcore punk
- Years active: 1986–1988
- Label: Deep Six
- Spinoff of: Metallica; Hirax
- Past members: Katon W. De Pena; Rodney Nicholson; Ron McGovney; Carlos Guacio; Johny Tabares; Nathan Williams; Gene Hoglan; Jim Korthe

Phantasm was an American thrash metal band from Los Angeles, active between 1986 and 1988. The supergroup included several notable members, including early Metallica bassist Ron McGovney, Hirax singer Katon W. De Pena, and prolific drummer Gene Hoglan. The band did not record an album during its period of activity, but issued live and demo material on the 2001 CD Wreckage.

== History ==
In 1986, De Pena convinced McGovney to return to music after the four-year hiatus that followed McGovney's departure from Metallica. They formed Phantasm with young guitarist Rodney Nicholson and Hirax members Carlos Guacio playing guitar and Johny Tabares playing drums. Nathan Williams replaced Guacio later that year. Hoglan, then of Dark Angel, played drums on the 1987 Wreckage demo cassette, the group's only studio recording. Teenage drummer Jim Korthe joined the group thereafter.

The band played fast thrash metal with hardcore punk influence. The strength of their individual reputations helped to bring them minor success, and they toured with Nuclear Assault and played alongside other noted metal peers like Possessed and Dark Angel, as well as punk bands Uniform Choice, Dag Nasty and the Plasmatics. The band dissolved in 1988 due to internal tensions, prior to recording a proper album.

=== Post-breakup ===
De Pena temporarily ceased his musical career shortly after Phantasm's demise, but later reformed Hirax. Hoglan remained very active, playing with such groups as Death, Testament, Strapping Young Lad, Forbidden, Opeth, and Fear Factory. McGovney again ended his activity in music and later relocated to North Carolina. Nicholson began the solo metal project Skullpile, whose debut album is in production. Korthe went on to lead the nu metal groups Dimestore Hoods and 3rd Strike, but died in January 2010 of causes stemming from respiratory problems.

The thrash label Deep Six Records released the Wreckage album in 2001, packaging a remastered version of the group's demo with a live recording from 1987. In 2007, the group established a MySpace page with new, instrumental recordings of Phantasm songs performed by Nicholson. McGovney also contributed to the page, and the band expressed interest in reforming, but a reunion ultimately did not materialize.

== Members ==
- Katon W. De Pena – vocals (1986–1988)
- Rodney Nicholson – guitar (1986–1988)
- Ron McGovney – bass (1986–1988)
- Carlos Guacio – guitar (1986)
- Nathan Williams – guitar (1986–1988)
- Johny Tabares – drums (1986–1987)
- Gene Hoglan – session drums (1987)
- Jim Korthe – drums (1987–1988; died 2010)

Timeline

== Discography ==
- Wreckage (demo cassette, 1987)
- Wreckage (2001)
