= Ron McGovney =

American bassist (born 1963)

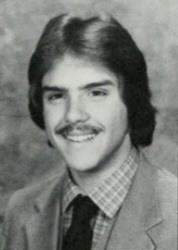
- McGovney in 1981

Background information
- Born: Ronald J. McGovney; November 2, 1963 (age 63); Los Angeles, California, U.S.
- Genres: Thrash metal; speed metal
- Occupation: Bass guitarist
- Years active: 1980–1982; 1986–1988; 2011
- Formerly of: Leather Charm; Metallica; Phantasm

Ronald J. McGovney (born November 2, 1963) is an American musician who was the original bassist of the thrash metal band Metallica from 1981 to 1982. Having previously played with guitarist James Hetfield in the garage band Leather Charm, McGovney was a member of Metallica during its first year of gigging, and appeared on their early demos before departing late in 1982, prior to the start of recording for the band's debut album, Kill 'Em All in May 1983. He was replaced by Cliff Burton.

After a period of inactivity, he played in the thrash metal band Phantasm. He later played with Metallica at their 30th anniversary show.

== Career ==
=== Leather Charm and Metallica ===
In June 1981, McGovney formed his first band, Leather Charm, with his childhood friend Hetfield and guitarist Hugh Tanner of Hetfield's previous band, Phantom Lord. Tanner soon left Leather Charm to pursue a career in music management; the subsequent lineup featured guitarist Troy James and drummer Jim Mulligan. The group rehearsed a set of New Wave of British Heavy Metal covers and original material for a period of months, but Mulligan's departure later that year led to the band's demise.

Hetfield and drummer Lars Ulrich established their new project, Metallica, in October 1981. With the addition of McGovney and guitarist Dave Mustaine early the next year, the first gigging lineup of the band was completed. After their debut performance on March 14, the band spent 1982 rehearsing in McGovney's parents' long-since-demolished rental property near the 605 freeway and building a local following in the Los Angeles and Orange County heavy metal scenes. They recorded several demos during this time, including one recorded in McGovney's garage, the Power Metal demo and the No Life 'Til Leather demo.

McGovney's time in Metallica was reportedly tumultuous, as he often clashed with Ulrich and Mustaine. He felt that, aside from using his connections made as an amateur photographer, his role was that of monetary and transportation provider, rather than a respected member of the band. He ultimately quit on December 10, 1982, due to growing tensions, and was replaced by Cliff Burton. After leaving Metallica, McGovney became uninterested in playing music and sold most of his equipment.

=== Phantasm ===
In 1986, Hirax vocalist Katon W. De Pena persuaded McGovney to return to music. The two formed the thrash metal band Phantasm with guitarist Rodney Nicholson and several other musicians, briefly including Dark Angel drummer Gene Hoglan. Phantasm released a demo but never recorded a proper album, and disbanded in 1988 due to disagreements between members. In 2001, the thrash label Deep Six Records released the Wreckage CD, packaging a remastered version of the band's demo of the same name with a live set from 1987.

=== Later activity ===
McGovney ceased his musical career after the demise of Phantasm, but gave sporadic interviews and appeared at Metallica-related events. Phantasm discussed a possible reunion in 2007, but this ultimately failed to materialize.

He performed publicly for the first time in 23 years on December 10, 2011, playing two songs ("Hit the Lights" and "Seek & Destroy") onstage with Metallica, Mustaine, and early studio guitarist Lloyd Grant, among others, at The Fillmore as a part of the celebrations surrounding the end of the group's third decade. Two years later, he joined Mustaine's band Megadeth onstage in Charlotte, North Carolina, on December 5, 2013, sharing the lead vocal on a cover version of Thin Lizzy's "Cold Sweat".

McGovney has said that, although his time in Metallica came to an acrimonious end, he now gets along with his former bandmates and speculates that, given his disposition and skills, he might have been better able to contribute to the band had he worked as road manager rather than bass guitarist.

Preceded by Original	Metallica bassist 1981–1982	Succeeded by Cliff Burton
