= Hirax =

American thrash metal band

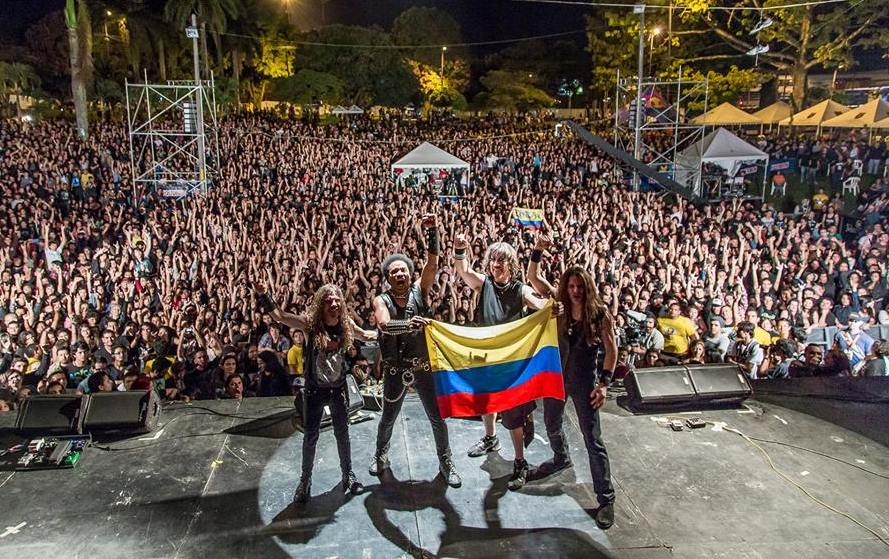
- HIRAX in Pereira, Colombia, July 2013

Background information
- Origin: Cypress, California, U.S.
- Genres: Thrash metal; crossover thrash; speed metal
- Years active: 1984–1989; 2000–present
- Labels: Black Devil; Deep Six; Metal Blade; Mausoleum; Season of Mist; SPV
- Spinoffs: Phantasm
- Members: Katon W. De Pena; Mathew Morales; Geremi Perez
- Past members: see List of band members

Hirax (often stylized as HIRAX) is an American thrash metal band from Cypress, California. Starting in 1984 under the leadership of vocalist Katon W. De Pena (the band's only original member left in the current line-up), the band played in Los Angeles and San Francisco with several of their thrash metal peers such as Metallica, Slayer and Exodus. The band was an early example of thrash metal, speed metal and crossover thrash, yet inspired by cross-genre influences including blues vocalist Sam Cooke, who De Pena once cited as "the greatest vocalist [De Pena] has ever heard."

== History ==
After releasing some demos, Hirax signed with Metal Blade and debuted with their first full-length, Raging Violence, in 1985. The band was composed of Katon W. De Pena (vocals), Scott Owen (guitar), Gary Monardo (bass) and John Tabares (drums).

In 1986, John Tabares left the band and Eric Brecht (brother of D.R.I.'s vocalist Kurt Brecht) joined. After the change, they released their second album, Hate, Fear and Power, which was only 16 minutes and eight songs in length. After this release, the band quit the label and independently released a demo called Blasted In Bangkok in 1987.

But with tensions and disillusions in the band, De Pena decided to leave and form a new band with Gene Hoglan (former Dark Angel drummer), and Ron McGovney (former Metallica bassist). They called themselves Phantasm and released a six-track demo in 1988 (re-issued in 2002 as a CD with the demo and live tracks). After a brief tour with Nuclear Assault, they broke up. In 1989, after De Pena left, the replacement was Paul Baloff (former Exodus frontman). But soon after the band broke up.

=== Reunion ===
De Pena stayed involved in the regional underground music scene and took a job working at a local music store. In 1997, he featured one of his old songs on a split 7-inch with Spazz, the band of one of his friends. By 1998, De Pena had received enough fan mail and interest which encouraged him to reunite Hirax in 2000. De Pena reunited the band with the original lineup of Scott Owen, Gary Monardo, and John Tabares, releasing the El Diablo Negro EP in 2000. In 2002, the band played in Abrasive Rock Fest. In 2003, the band played in Bang Your Head Festival, in Germany. The lineup completely changed, and Hirax released the album Barrage of Noise in 2001 with James Joseph Hubler, Justin Lent (Clusterfux), and Nick Seelinger. This lineup was brief as well.

In 2003, De Pena recruited an entirely new lineup again, and released the album The New Age of Terror in 2004 with guitarists Dave Watson and Glenn Rogers (formerly of Deliverance), bassist Angelo Espino, and drummer Jorge Iacobellis. The lineup was also short-lived due to irreconcilable differences.

The band released their fourth studio album, El Rostro de la Muerte, in the spring of 2009. On July 20, 2013, Hirax performed at the International Festival Convivencia Rock 2013 that took place in Pereira, Colombia. Thirty-six bands played in the three-day festival and 10,000 people gathered each day of the event.

On February 24, 2014, the band released their album titled Immortal Legacy, courtesy of Steamhammer Records.

March 2015 saw the band play in the UK for the first time in their history, beginning with an appearance at Hammerfest in Gwynedd, Wales.

On August 1, 2024, the band released a new EP, Faster than Death. Their first studio album in 11 years, also titled Faster than Death, was released in February 2025.

Hirax is currently working on a new album, which is due for release in 2026 or 2027. The band is scheduled to perform at Milwaukee Metal Fest in June 2026.

== Members ==
Current members

- Katon W. De Pena (Bobby Johnson) — lead vocals (1984–1986, 1987–1988, 2000–present)
- Mathew Morales — drums (2025–present)
- Geremi Perez — guitars, backing vocals (2025–present)

Former members

- Gary Monardo — bass (1984–1987, 1987–1988, 2000–2001)
- Bob Savage — guitars (1984)
- Brian Keith — drums (1984)
- Scott Owen — guitars (1984–1988, 2000)
- Johnny Tabares — drums (1984–1986, 1987–1988, 2000–2001, 2006)
- Eric Brecht — drums (1986)
- Steve (surname unknown) — vocals (1986)
- Paul Baloff — vocals (1986–1987; died 2002)
- Billy Wedgeworth — vocals (1987; died 2010)
- Sherman Jones — bass (1987)
- Greg Eickmier — guitars (2000–2001)
- James Joseph Hubler — guitars (2001–2002)
- Justin Lent — guitars, bass (2001)
- Shaun Ross — bass (2001)
- Per Möller Jensen — drums (2001)
- Nick Seelinger — drums (2001)
- Mike Brickman — bass (2001–2003)
- Dan Bellinger — drums (2001–2003)
- Jim Durkin — guitars (2001–2002)
- Roberto Carrero — guitars (2002–2003)
- Glenn Rogers — guitars (2003–2005, 2006–2007, 2008–2011)
- Jorge Iacobellis — drums (2003–2004, 2008–2014)
- Dave Watson — guitars (2003–2005)
- Angelo Espino — bass (2003–2005)
- Dave Chedrick — drums (2004–2005)
- Lance Harrison — guitars (2006–2022)
- Steve Harrison — bass (2006–2022)
- Fabricio Ravelli — drums (2006–2007, 2007–2008)
- Tim Thomas — guitars (2007–2008, 2011)
- Mike Guerrero — guitars (2011–2013)
- Mike Vega — drums (2014–2022)
- Kelly McLauchlin — bass (2018, 2019, 2023; touring only)
- Neil Metcalf — guitars, bass (2022–2024)
- Chris Aguire II — bass (2022–2023)
- Francisco Zamudio — drums (2022–2023)
- Danny Walker — drums (2023–2024)
- Jose Gonzalez — Bass (2024-2025)
- Emilio Marquez -Drums (2024-2025)

== Discography ==
Studio albums

- Raging Violence (1985)
- Hate, Fear and Power (1986)
- The New Age of Terror (2004)
- El Rostro de la Muerte (2009)
- Immortal Legacy (2014)
- Faster than Death (2025)

Split albums

- Spazz/Hirax (1997)
- Louder Than Hell (2005)
- Hirax/F.K.Ü. (Sweden) (2008)
- Hirax/Violator (Brazil) "Raging Thrash" (2010)
- Hirax / Sodom, split 7-inch SPV Records "Hellion Rising" (2013)

EPs

- El Diablo Negro (2000)
- Barrage of Noise (2001)
- Assassins of War (2007)
- Chaos and Brutality (2007)
- Faster Than Death (2024)

Demos

- Demo 1984 (1984)
- Demo Rehearsal 1 (1985)
- Demo Rehearsal 2 (1985)
- Blasted in Bangkok (1987)

Compilation albums

- Anglican Scrape Attic Earache Records (1985), flexi 7-inch, Hirax, Lip Cream, Execute, Sacrilege, Concrete Sox
- Not Dead Yet (1987)
- The Best of Metal Blade Records, Vol. 1 (1987), various artists
- Thrash of the Titans (1999)
- Thrash Metal Warriors (2007), HIRAX, Toxic Holocaust, Sabbat, Kat, etc.
- Thrash Metal Assassins (2008)
- Noise Chaos War (2010)

DVDs

- Thrash 'Til Death (2006)
- Thrash and Destroy (2008)
- True Thrash Fest (2010), Live in Japan
