= Horacio Villafañe =

- Born: Horacio Carlos Oscar Villafañe; 20 October 1963; San Isidro, Buenos Aires, Argentina
- Died: 22 November 2011 (aged 48) Buenos Aires, Argentina
- Genres: Punk rock, gothic rock, alternative rock, reggae fusion, post-punk
- Occupations: Musician, singer-songwriter
- Instruments: Guitar, vocals
- Years active: 1979–2011
- Labels: RCA; Sony Music; Gora Herriak; TTM Discos; Maldito Records
- Formerly of: Todos Tus Muertos, Los 7 Delfines, El Otro Yo, Los Laxantes, La Sobrecarga, Los Fabulosos Cadillacs

Horacio Carlos Oscar "Gamexane" Villafañe (20 October 1963 – 22 November 2011) was an Argentine musician, singer and songwriter, and one of the original members of the rock band Todos Tus Muertos. Rolling Stone magazine ranked him 92nd on its list of "100 Best Argentine Guitarists".

== Biography ==
Villafañe was born in San Isidro, province of Buenos Aires, in October 1963. From a middle-class family, Villafañe grew up in San Bernardo, where interested by the music, listening bands like The Clash, the Sex Pistols and Wire. In the mid-1970s, began to play guitar, styles as punk and reggae music.

In 1979, he formed Los Laxantes, one of the first Argentine punk bands, with Enrique "X" Valle and Felix "Sagnia" Gutiérrez, recording a demo by 1981. In 1982, Los Laxantes temporarily disbanded because Gamexane fulfilled his mandatory military service in 1982. He served as a soldier during the Falklands War, where he suffered the loss of friends and terrible experiences in combat, but came out unscathed from the war. After the war, he returned to Argentina, where began to work and play again with Los Laxantes in 1983. Also was member of the Goth group La Sobrecarga, between 1985 and 1987, recording two studio albums for Columbia Records and opened for the British band The Cure at Ferrocarril Oeste Stadium in February 1987.

After the Los Laxantes return and dissolving newly in late 1984, Gamexane and Felix with Jorge Serrano started Todos Tus Muertos in 1985. Then of a few shows, Serrano leaves the band, and Fidel Nadal took over as lead singer. In 1986, the new line-up recorded Noches Agitadas en el Cementerio, with eight tracks and in 1988, by RCA label released their eponymous debut LP, but then RCA expired the contractual obligations with them. Villafañe, not satisfied with the current band's wave and the little success that kept decided to walk out in 1989 and was replaced by Julio Amin.

Gamexane began in 1990, a new band with Richard Coleman (former Soda Stereo) called Los 7 Delfines, released their first album in 1992, with success. Too, in the early 1990s, recorded and touring with his friend Sergio Rotman, as guest, in Los Fabulosos Cadillacs. By 1993, after a series of troubles with Coleman, Gamexane announcing his departure from Los 7 Delfines.

In 1993, Felix Gutiérrez asked Gamexane to return to Todos Tus Muertos, an offer which he accepted. Since then, he remained with them to the break-up in 2000, due to internal problems with Fidel Nadal and Pablo Molina over the musical direction.

By 2006, Todos Tus Muertos returned with Pablo Molina as the only singer, with Félix Gutiérrez, Christian Fabrizio and Germán Álvarez. That same year, the group toured in Argentina and Mexico and released a live album Re-Unión en Vivo, in 2007, and then, in 2010 released with a new studio album, Crisis Mundial.

== Death ==
At early November 2011 in Costa Rica, Todos Tus Muertos would begin a New Mexico Tour, but before Gamexane was sick, for which the band cancelled the dates in Mexico. Back in Buenos Aires, was hospitalized in Sanatorio Güemes, under medical surveillance. After 15 days in coma, Horacio Villafañe died from internal bleeding on 22 November 2011. The following day after his death, the members of Todos Tus Muertos released a statement to commemorate him and announced the disbandment.

== Discography ==
=== With La Sobrecarga ===
- Sentidos congelados (1986)
- Mentirse y creerse (1987)
- Cenizas del tiempo (2013)

=== With Todos Tus Muertos ===
- Noche agitada en el cementerio (1986)
- Todos Tus Muertos (1988)
- Dale Aborigen (1994)
- Argentina te Asesina (1995)
- Subversiones (1996)
- El Camino Real (1998)
- Re-Unión en Vivo (2006)
- Crisis Mundial (2010)

=== With Los Fabulosos Cadillacs ===
- Volumen 5 (1990)

=== With El Otro Yo ===
- Colmena (2002)

=== With Responsables No Inscriptos ===
- El juego o la vida (2004)
