= Faster than Death =

Studio album by Hirax
- Released: February 28, 2025
- Recorded: 2023–2024
- Genre: Thrash metal
- Length: 21:47
- Label: Armageddon Label
- Producer: Max Norman

Hirax chronology
Immortal Legacy (2014)	Faster than Death (2025)

Professional ratings
Review scores
Source	Rating
Blabbermouth.net	8/10
Ghost Cult Magazine	9/10

Faster than Death is the sixth studio album by American thrash metal band Hirax, released on February 28, 2025, a week after its originally scheduled release date, February 21. It became available for streaming a day early. After guitarist/bassist Neil Metcalf and drummer Danny Walker quit the band, Hirax toured in support of the album with a live lineup that included bassist Jose Gonzalez, drummer Mathew Morales, and guitarist Geremi Perez. "World's End" was released as a single on January 27, 2025.

== Track listing ==
No.	Title	Length
1.	"Drill into the Brain"	1:05
2.	"Armageddon"	2:54
3.	"Drowned Bodies"	2:44
4.	"Faster than Death"	1:34
5.	"Psychiatric Ward"	1:33
6.	"Relentless"	2:24
7.	"Revenant"	3:45
8.	"Warlord's Command"	2:36
9.	"World's End"	3:12
Total length:		21:47

== Personnel ==
Hirax

- Katon W. de Pena – vocals
- Neil Metcalf – guitars, bass
- Danny Walker – drums

Production

- Rafael Mattey – design, layout
- Roberto Mattey – design, layout
- Thomas Pinheiro – cover art
- Bill Metoyer – recording, engineering
- Max Norman – mixing, mastering, production
