= Immortal Legacy =

Studio album by Hirax
- Released: February 24, 2014
- Recorded: 2013
- Genre: Thrash metal
- Length: 38:02
- Label: SPV

Hirax chronology
El Rostro de la Muerte (2009)	Immortal Legacy (2014)	Faster than Death (2025)

Immortal Legacy is the fifth studio album by American thrash metal band Hirax, released on February 24, 2014. It is the first album since the 1980s to feature a four-piece band. It is also the final album to feature Jorge Iacobellis and Lance and Steve Harrison.

A music video was made for the song "Hellion Rising".

== Track listing ==
No.	Title	Length
1.	"Black Smoke"	4:35
2.	"Hellion Rising"	4:05
3.	"Victims of the Dead"	3:07
4.	"Thunder Roar, the Conquest, La boca de la bestia - The Mouth of the Beast"	4:54
5.	"Earthshaker" (Instrumental)	0:44
6.	"Tied to the Gallows Pole"	4:05
7.	"Deceiver"	3:42
8.	"Immortal Legacy"	4:40
9.	"S.O.W." (Instrumental)	0:57
10.	"Violence of Action"	3:36
11.	"Atlantis (Journey to Atlantis)" (Instrumental)	1:30
12.	"The World Will Burn"	2:07
Total length:		38:02

Digital edition bonus track
No.	Title	Length
1.	"Mephistopheles"	5:16
Total length:		43:18

12" vinyl bonus track
No.	Title	Length
1.	"Mass Hysteria"	3:45
Total length:		41:47

== Personnel ==
Hirax

- Katon W. de Pena – vocals
- Lance Harrison – guitars
- Steve Harrison – bass
- Jorge Iacobellis – drums

Additional musicians

- Juan Garcia – guitars on "Hellion Rising"
- Jim Durkin – guitars
- Rocky George – guitars
- Fabricio Ravelli – drums

Production

- Rafael Mattey – design, layout
- Phil Lawvere – cover art
- Bill Metoyer – recording, mixing, mastering, production
