= The New Age of Terror =

Studio album by Hirax
- Released: May 18th, 2004
- Genre: Thrash metal
- Label: Deep Six Records

Hirax chronology
Hate, Fear and Power (1986)	The New Age of Terror (2004)	El Rostro de la Muerte (2009)

Professional ratings
Review scores
Source	Rating
Allmusic	4.5/5 stars

The New Age of Terror is the third studio album by American thrash metal band Hirax and the first after their reunion. It consisted of new members with an added guitarist, now making it a five-piece band. The final track "Unleash the Dogs of War (Open the Gates)" opens with a quote from the 2003 film Underworld, "You're acting like a pack of rabid dogs."

== Track listing ==
No.	Title	Length
1.	"Killswitch"	3:46
2.	"Hostile Territory"	1:45
3.	"The New Age of Terror"	4:54
4.	"Swords of Steel"	3:59
5.	"Into the Ruins"	0:46
6.	"Massacre of the Innocent" (Instrumental)	1:41
7.	"Hell on Earth"	4:23
8.	"Suffer"	3:38
9.	"El Día de los Muertos (The Day of the Dead)" (Instrumental)	2:13
10.	"El Diablo Negro"	4:14
11.	"Unleash the Dogs of War (Open the Gates)"	5:56
Total length:		37:15

== Personnel ==
- Katon W. De Pena (Bobby Johnson) - vocals
- Glenn Rogers - guitars
- Dave Watson - guitars
- Angelo Espino - bass
- Jorge Iacobellis - drums

Production

- Michael Rozon - production, recording
- Marc Jacquette - photography
- Didier Scohier - artwork
- Anne Jakobsen - photography
