= El Rostro de la Muerte =

Studio album by Hirax
- Released: November 16, 2009
- Genre: Thrash metal
- Label: Black Devil Records

Hirax chronology
The New Age of Terror (2004)	El Rostro de la Muerte (2009)	Immortal Legacy (2014)

El Rostro de la Muerte (Spanish for "The Face of Death") is the fourth studio album by American thrash metal band Hirax, released on November 16, 2009. It is the first to feature the brothers Steve Harrison (bass) and Lance Harrison (guitar), and the last with Glenn Rogers.

Music videos were made for the songs "El Rostro de la Muerte (The Face of Death)" and "Broken Neck".

== Track listing ==
No.	Title	Length
1.	"Baptized by Fire"	4:18
2.	"Flesh and Blood"	5:46
3.	"Eradicate Mankind"	3:39
4.	"Chaos and Brutality"	3:38
5.	"El Rostro de la Muerte (The Face of Death)"	6:22
6.	"Blind Faith" (re-recorded version of song from Hate, Fear and Power)	2:49
7.	"Horrified"	2:52
8.	"Battle of the North" (Instrumental)	1:33
9.	"The Laws of Temptation"	4:39
10.	"Death Militia"	1:51
11.	"Broken Neck"	2:01
12.	"Violent Assault"	3:32
13.	"Cuando Cae la Oscuridad (When Darkness Falls)" (Instrumental)	1:57
14.	"Satan's Fall"	6:24
Total length:		51:21

A picture disc vinyl edition by Deep Six Records contains a 7" single. The track listing is as follows:

Side A
No.	Title	Length
1.	"Flesh and Blood"	5:46

Side B
No.	Title	Length
2.	"The Laws of Temptation"	4:39
Total length:		10:25

2010 Hurling Metal Records bonus tracks
No.	Title	Length
1.	"Bombs of Death"	1:49
2.	"El Diablo Negro"	4:13
Total length:		57:23

== Personnel ==
- Katon W. De Pena (Bobby Johnson) - vocals
- Glenn Rogers - guitars
- Lance Harrison - guitars
- Steve Harrison - bass
- Jorge Iacobellis - drums

Production

- Ed Repka - cover art
- John Haddad - recording
- Maor Appelbaum - mastering
- Reinaldo Lopez - executive producer
- Andy Haller - mixing
