= Raging Violence =

- cover art by Pushead

Studio album by Hirax
- Released: November 1985
- Studios: Track Record Studios, North Hollywood, California
- Genres: Crossover thrash; thrash metal
- Length: 30:52
- Label: Metal Blade/Enigma
- Producer: Hirax

Hirax chronology
Raging Violence (1985)	Hate, Fear and Power (1986)

Professional ratings
Review scores
Source	Rating
AllMusic	3/5 stars

Raging Violence is the debut album by American thrash metal band Hirax, released in 1985 through Metal Blade Records.

== Music and lyrics ==
Loudwire stated that the vocals "alternated between vicious snarling and semi-operatic screams." They described the music as a "bi-polar blend of blazing thrash and classic metal." The album is widely noted for De Pena's extremely high-pitched heavy metal singing style. Most of the album's tracks have very short durations. The album also contains elements of hardcore punk, crossover thrash, and punk rock. AllMusic described the style as "speedcore". The album's lyrics explore themes such as war, horror, spirit possession and real life.

== Track listing ==
All tracks are written by Gary Monardo, Scott Owen and Katon W. De Pena, except where noted.

Side A
No.	Title	Length
1.	"Demons - Evil Forces"	3:25
2.	"Blitzkrieg Air Attack"	2:08
3.	"Guardian Protector"	1:37
4.	"Bombs of Death" (Owen, De Pena)	1:47
5.	"Defeat of Amalek"	3:08
6.	"Raging Violence"	2:53
7.	"Call of the Gods" (Monardo, De Pena)	1:20

Side B
No.	Title	Length
8.	"Warlords Command"	2:39
9.	"Suicide" (Monardo, De Pena)	2:37
10.	"Executed"	1:40
11.	"The Gauntlet"	2:03
12.	"Destruction and Terror" (Monardo, De Pena)	2:33
13.	"Destroy" (Monardo, De Pena)	1:07
14.	"Bloodbath"	1:55

== Personnel ==
- Katon W. De Pena (Bobby Johnson) - vocals
- Gary Monardo - bass
- Scott Owen - guitars
- John Tabares - drums

Production

- Bill Metoyer - engineering
- Tom G. Warrior - logo
- Stephanie Barrett - photography
- Joe Henderson - photography
- Bill Hale - photography
- John Fetters - photography
- Rick Smith - photography
- Ken Rojas - photography
- Todd Nakamine - photography
- Morgan Young - photography
- Lisha Mahoney - photography
- Brian "Pushead" Schroeder - cover art
