= Todos Tus Muertos =

Argentinian rasta-punk band

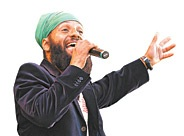
- Fidel Nadal, frontman of TTM

Background information
- Also known as: TTM
- Origin: Buenos Aires, Argentina
- Genres: Punk rock Reggae fusion Ska-punk; Alternative rock Post-punk (early)
- Years active: 1985–2000; 2004–2011; 2015–present
- Labels: RCA; Universal Music; Esan Ozenki; Maldito Records
- Members: Fidel Nadal; Felix Gutiérrez; Pablo Molina; Germán Álvarez; Ricki Sanguinetti; Damián Domínguez
- Past members: Christian Fabrizio; Jorge Iacobellis; Julio Amin; Pablo Potenzoni; Cristian Ruiz; Leo de Cecco; Horacio "Gamexane"†
- Website: www.ttm-oficial.com.ar

Todos Tus Muertos (All Your Dead, in English) is a rasta-punk band from Argentina formed in Buenos Aires, in 1985. The longtime line-up comprised by a young vocalist Fidel Nadal, Horacio "Gamexane" Villafañe on guitar, Felix Gutiérrez on bass, and drummer Pablo Potenzoni. They achieved international success throughout the 1990s. The band was part from the second Argentine punk movement that emerged during the mid-1980s. By 2015, a reunion show was announced with Fidel Nadal, Felix Gutiérrez and Pablo Molina at the Jamming Festival in Bogotá, Colombia on 5 June 2016, and more recently three more show in Chile and Mexico.

== History ==
=== 1985–1992: The beginning and first albums ===
After Los Laxantes disbanded, Horacio "Gamexane" and Felix Gutiérrez started playing around 1985 as Todos Tus Muertos, with Fidel Nadal on vocals.

In 1986, the new line-up recorded their first demo called Noches Agitadas en el Cementerio at Parakultural club, with eight tracks produced by Daniel Melero. In 1988, the band signed a deal with RCA label and released their eponymous debut studio album, produced by Carlos "Mundy" Epifanio, the group's manager. The only promotional single was "Gente Que No", which received positive reception from FM radio stations, but then RCA broke contractual obligations with them due to album low-sales.

After one year they began recording their next album, Horacio "Gamexane" and Cristian Ruiz left the band in 1989, leading to the group into a brief hiatus. By 1990, Felix Gutiérrez and Fidel Nadal started work with a new line-up: Julio Amin on guitar and Jorge Iacobellis on drums. In 1991, they signed to Radio Tripoli label and released their second album Nena de Hiroshima. After a few shows, Gutierrez and Nadal were invited to collaborate with Mano Negra. Along with Manu Chao and the rest of Mano Negra, they went to Colombia where they recorded La Casa Babylon. By 1992, Todos Tus Muertos had begun to play larger venues, opening for the Ramones, during their gigs at the Estadio Obras in September of that same year.

=== 1993–1995: Breakthrough success and international tours ===
In 1993, Jorge Iacobellis left the band, was replaced by Pablo Potenzoni and then Horacio "Gamexane" returned to group. The next year, Todos Tus Muertos released Dale Aborigen which featured Manu Chao, Fermín Muguruza of Negu Gorriak, and also band members of Los Fabulosos Cadillacs and Los Auténticos Decadentes. In this record there was a mixture reggae, hip hop, punk and other Latin rhythms. With this album they did an international tour which included Mexico, Peru, Panama, Puerto Rico, the United States, France, Spain and Colombia. The album, together with interactive features, was released throughout the world outside of their native Argentina on Grita! Records.

=== 1996–2000: TTM label, struggles and break-up ===
In 1996, the band contributed along with Auténticos Decadentes to the AIDS benefit album Silencio=Muerte: Red Hot + Latin produced by the Red Hot Organization. In 1997, they formed their own label: TTM Discos (Todos Tus Muertos records) and released Subversiones, and released albums by other bands such as Cienfuegos and Karamelo Santo. In 1998, Todos Tus Muertos released El Camino Real, the last with the classic line-up. By the late 1990s, Fidel Nadal and Pablo Molina formed Lumumba, a rastamuffin group oriented to the Rastafrian culture, much to Gamexane's annoyance, since the latter's only priority was Todos Tus Muertos and he was stung that Nadal was pursuing his own projects. In 1999, the band began a new extended tour, including Japan as new leg. In mid 2000, Todos Tus Muertos disbanded due to internal problems, mainly between Fidel Nadal and Horacio "Gamexane". In 2001, Gamexane, Felix and a young drummer called Pedro formed Los Muertos (The Dead Ones) and performed some shows between 2001 and 2003. Pablo Pontezoni based himself in Spain, where still lives today, and Pablo Molina moved to Mexico.

=== 2004–2011: The Return, Crisis Mundial and death of Horacio Gamexane ===
Some former members participated in several festivals, including a performance in Quilmes Rock of 2004. Todos Tus Muertos formally returned with Pablo Molina as the singer in "Oye Reggae" Festival in Cordoba, in January 2006. That same year, the group toured in Mexico and released Re-Unión, the first album in eight years. They then continued with Pablo Molina, Felix Gutierrez (the only consistent member), "Gamexane" Villafañe, Christian Fabrizio and Germán Álvarez as the new line-up.

In 2010 the band returned with a new album, Crisis Mundial with 11 unreleased tracks and a Bob Marley cover.

Their last gig was at Latin Rock Cafe in San Jose de Costa Rica in November 2011, then the band canceled a Mexican tour due to Villafañe's health problems. Back In Argentina, Horacio Villafañe died on November 23, at the age of 48.

After the death of Villafañe, Todos Tus Muertos are disbanded.

=== 2015–present: Reunion with Fidel Nadal ===
By early 2015, Fidel Nadal in an interview to "Rock&Pop" radio, talked about the possibility of a reunion show with Felix and Pablo, as Todos Tus Muertos. On 3 October in the TTM Facebook page it was officially confirmed that a show in Colombia would take place on 5 June 2016 at the Jamming Festival in Bogotá, and then on 15 February, three shows in Chile and Mexico were announced. Todos Tus Muetos played in Chile on La Cúpula theater and Lollapalooza Festival on March 18 and 19 respectively, with Ricardo "Ricki" Sanguinetti on guitar, Damián Domínguez on drums (both Fidel Nadal's backing band members) and Germán Álvarez on keyboards.

They were also scheduled to play live on 10 June 2016 during the 2016 Vica.Life Entertainment and Sports marathon for Kids in Rosarito Beach, Baja, Mexico.

In August, they announced via Facebook their first shows in Argentina in 5 years. The first gig was to be at Teatro Vorterix Rosario, Santa Fe on 2 September and the other at Groove on 24 September, which sold-out. The band continues to play in Argentina and the rest of world, and there remains the possibility of a new album.

== Name ==
Fidel Nadal and Horacio "Gamexane" said in an interview to Pelo magazine that the name of the band refers to the casualties in Argentina's Dirty War, to Pope John Paul II motto Totus Tuus.

== Members ==
2015–present Line-Up

- Felix Gutiérrez - bass guitar and backing vocals.
- Fidel Nadal - lead vocals.
- Pablo Molina - vocals and percussion.
- Germán Álvarez - keyboards.
- Ricki Sanguinetti - lead guitar.
- Damián Domínguez - drums.

2004–2011 Line-Up

- Felix Gutiérrez - bass guitar and backing vocals. (1985–2011)
- Horacio "Gamexane" - lead guitar and backing vocals. (1985–1990, 1993–2011, died 2011)
- Pablo Molina - vocals, percussion. (1994–2011)
- Christian Fabrizio - drums. (2004–2011)
- Germán Álvarez - keyboards. (2004–2011)

Former members

- Jorge Iacobellis - drums. (1990–1993)
- Julio Amin - lead guitar. (1990–1993)
- Pablo Potenzoni - drums. (1993–2000)
- Cristian Ruiz - drums. (1985–1989)

== Discography ==
=== Studio albums ===
- Todos Tus Muertos (1988)
- Nena de Hiroshima (1991)
- Dale Aborigen (1994)
- Subversiones (1996)
- El Camino Real (1998)
- Crisis Mundial (2010)

=== Live albums ===
- Argentina te Asesina (1995)
- Re-Unión (2006)

=== Compilations ===
- Greatest Hits (2008, in Mexico only)

== See also ==
- Argentine punk
- Argentine rock
