= Jorge Iacobellis =

Drummer

- Born: August 12, 1956 (age 69); Argentina
- Genres: Thrash metal; heavy metal; reggae; punk; rock
- Instrument: Drums
- Years active: 1981–present
- Website: misterpowerdrums.com

Jorge Iacobellis (born August 12, 1956) is an Argentine drummer, tour promoter and producer primarily known as the drummer of the thrash metal band Hirax and former drummer of Todos Tus Muertos. He promoted and produced international bands on tour such as Kreator, Sick of It All, Viper, Ratos de Porão and Testament and assisted in the tour productions with Kiss, Iron Maiden, Machine Head, Jerry Lee Lewis, Motörhead, Exodus, Sepultura, Ramones, Poison, REO Speedwagon, Slayer and L.A. Guns.

== Biography ==
Jorge began his musical education in the Teatro Colón in Buenos Aires. In 1981 he became a member of the band Taxi. They played in 1983 Buenos Aires Rock Festival and recorded the album Como Me Gusta la Nait. In 1984 he founded the band Klhasch and in 1985 recorded their debut album Como Hago Para Desprenderme de la Envidia. In 1987 Manal's drummer Javier Martínez returned from France and founded Manal Javí with himself as singer and Jorge as drummer.

In 1991 he joined Todos Tus Muertos and was the artistic and executive producer and drummer of their second album, Nena de Hiroshima. They opened shows for Kreator, Ratos de Porão, Steve Jones, Mano Negra and The Ramones. He was chosen as one of the best heavy drummers in 1992 through a national contest, promoted by the magazine Drums & Percussion. In 1993 he toured Brazil as guest drummer for Metal Blade's speed metal band Garcia Garcia. In 1995 he joined Argentine thrash metal band Velocet and opened two shows for Testament. Impressed by his performance, Testament invited him to come and play in the United States.

In August 2002, Jorge became a member of California horror punk and heavy metal band Rosemary's Billygoat. He toured twice with the band throughout the United States and Canada presenting their album Evilution. Part of this tour was captured on film and included in footage of the documentary video Propstar.

In July 2003 he became a member of Hirax. The band played two shows in Bang Your Head Festival in Germany, amongst other bands like Dio, Twisted Sister, Overkill, Dokken and others. In September, he traveled back home to Argentina and did a drum clinic for the Drummers Club (Club de Bateristas de Argentina).

In 2004 after the release of The New Age of Terror the band tour Europe and played in Sweden Rock Festival, Headbangers Open Air Festival and Metal Bash Open Air Festival. Hirax released the DVD Thrash 'Til Death that includes the latest concerts with Jorge in Germany, Sweden and USA from The New Age of Terror tour. The re-release of the album includes bonus DVD footage of Jorge's performance. In April 2004, Jorge recorded for Silversteel. In May 2008, Hirax singer Katon W. De Pena invited him to return to the band and tour France. Upon their return from France, Jorge was officially recruited to the band and they toured the US. They played in The Tidal Metal Fest 13 together with Exodus. They also toured Norway, Japan and South America. In 2010 Hirax released a new album, El Rostro de la Muerte.

In January 2011 he played at the NAMM Show

== Discography ==
=== With Taxi ===
- Como Me Gusta la Nait (1983)

=== With Klhasch ===
- Como Hago Para Desprenderme de la Envidia (1985)

=== With Manal ===
- Manal Javi (1987)
- Aldo Giacomino(1987)

=== With Todos Tus Muertos ===
- Nena de Hiroshima (1991)

=== With Hirax ===
- The New Age of Terror (2004)
- Thrash 'Til Death (DVD) (2006)
- El Rostro de la Muerte (2009)
- True Thrash Fest (DVD) (2010)

=== With Lunatics on Parole ===
- Rise (2005)

=== With The Prodigal Son ===
- The Writer (2007)
