= Hate, Fear and Power =

Studio album by Hirax
- Released: August 1986
- Genre: Thrash metal
- Length: 16:00
- Label: Restless/Metal Blade
- Producer: Hirax

Hirax chronology
Raging Violence (1985)	Hate, Fear and Power (1986)	The New Age of Terror (2004)

Professional ratings
Review scores
Source	Rating
AllMusic	2.5/5 stars
Kerrang!	3/5 stars

Hate, Fear and Power is the second studio album by American thrash metal band Hirax, released in August 1986. The band considers this a full-length album despite the short length.

== Track listing ==
All lyrics are written by Katon W. DePena; all music is composed by Scott Owen and Gary Monardo, except where noted.

Side A
No.	Title	Length
1.	"Hate, Fear and Power" (music by Owen)	0:32
2.	"Blind Faith"	2:55
3.	"Unholy Sacrifice"	2:03
4.	"Lightning Thunder"	2:05

Side B
No.	Title	Length
5.	"The Last War"	2:33
6.	"The Plague"	1:55
7.	"Imprisoned by Ignorance"	1:57
8.	"Criminal Punishment"	2:00

== Personnel ==
- Katon W. De Pena (Bobby Johnson) - vocals
- Scott Owen - guitars
- Gary Monardo - bass
- Eric Brecht - drums

Production

- Bill Metoyer - engineering
- Tom G. Warrior - logo
- "Mad" Marc Rude - cover art
