= Chaos and Brutality =

EP by Hirax
- Released: October 15, 2007
- Genres: Thrash metal, speed metal, crossover thrash
- Label: Selfmadegod Records

Hirax chronology
Assassins of War (2007)	Chaos and Brutality (2007)	Thrash and Destroy (2008)

Chaos and Brutality is an EP by American thrash metal band Hirax. "Walk with Death" is a re-recorded version of a song off Hirax's 2001 EP, while "100,000 Strong" is the band's first recorded instrumental track. "Lucifer's Infierno Reprise" is a reprised version of the song "Lucifer's Infierno", which appeared on the band's 2007 EP Assassins of War.

== Track listing ==
No.	Title	Length
1.	"Chaos and Brutality"	3:34
2.	"Walk with Death"	3:24
3.	"100,000 Strong" (instrumental)	1:39
4.	"Lucifer's Infierno Reprise"	1:07
Total length:		9:44
