= Fidel Nadal =

Argentine musician (born 1965)

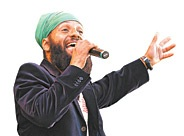

Background information
- Born: Fidel Ernesto Nadal; October 4, 1965 (age 60); Buenos Aires, Argentina
- Genres: Reggae, ragga, dancehall, punk rock, hardcore punk
- Years active: 1985–present
- Labels: Shalek Records, Nacional Records
- Website: fidelnadal.net

Fidel Nadal (Spanish pronunciation: [fiˈðel naˈðal]; born Fidel Ernesto Nadal on October 4, 1965) is an Afro-Argentinian Reggae musician, songwriter and pioneer of Argentine Reggae and the underground punk/hardcore movement of Argentina.

== Life and work ==
Nadal was born into an academic family in Buenos Aires, his mother was an anthropologist and visual artist and his father, Enrique Nadal, a film director and a leading fighter for the recognition of the rights of black Argentines. According to his own recollection, he was heavily influenced by the music listened to by his parents, mainly blues and jazz. His ideology involves deep Rastafarian culture from countries like Jamaica and Haiti; one of his inspirations, as with many reggae groups, is Bob Marley. His main influences are related to reggae rhythms and Afro-Argentine culture. Nadal is descendant of Angolan slaves brought to Buenos Aires in the 17th century. He is fluent in Spanish, English and Jamaican Patois.

In 1984 he played for the first time as a singer in a band. A year later he founded the band Todos Tus Muertos, which blended together reggae with punk influences and hip hop. With this mix, the group was very successful and recorded their first album in 1988 followed by a record deal with Universal Music. Influenced by reggae rhythms and the music of the Afro Argentine community, Nadal is best known for his work with Todos Tus Muertos. Created in the 1980s and separated in 2000, the band produced six albums before its dissolution. In the 1990s, Nadal formed Lumumba, a reggae band, along with his friend, Pablo Molina (also from Todos Tus Muertos) and his brother, Amilcar Nadal. In its short but productive history, it released four albums which met with approval by followers of reggae, but then it was dissolved. In the last albums of Todos Tus Muertos and Lumumba, Fidel felt the need to play more reggae and leave the hard music behind, but when both projects disappeared, he decided to go on by himself.

In 2001, this new project was born, with a completely rastafarian image and style. The same year, he launched three albums, Selassie I Dios Todopoderoso, with much reggae and pure rasta-vibe lyrics, including a cover of Mexican group Los Tigres del Norte, Cuando gime la raza, and Cabeza negra, with numerous guest musicians (which gave more variety to the album and made it different from the first one). Finally, Repatriación appeared, with a number of collaborators, and with another cover of a Tigres del Norte tune, La Puerta Negra. In 2008 he released the hit single International Love, off the album of the same name, whose dreamier/electronic sound has made it a hit on many Latino radio stations and attracted newer non-reggae listeners.

In 2009, his hit single International Love was included on the "FIFA Trax" on the latest edition of EA Sports football games, FIFA 10.

In 2011 he made three remix with reggaeton artist from Puerto Rico and Mexico, two with De La Ghetto in the song "Te Robaste Mi Corazón" Remix and "Te Robaste Mi Corazón Cumbia" Mix, with Julio Voltio in "International Love 2011" Remix, and with Adrian Banton "Dejenme Fumar" Remix.

In 2021, Nadal was featured in L-Gante's cumbia-reggae fusion single "Internacional Love 420".

== Honors and recognition ==
Nadal was featured twice on the cover of the Rolling Stone (Argentina) - in October 2009 for an edition dedicated to reggae “El Rasta Que Revolucionó el Rock Latino” (The Rasta that Revolutionized Latin Rock) and January 2012 in an edition dedicated to Argentine reggae.

In 2011, Fidel received two Latin Grammy nominations for Best Alternative Album Forever Together and Best Alternative Song “Te Robaste Mi Corazón.”

Fidel Nadal is currently recording new music and touring locally and internationally as a solo artist and with Todos Tus Muertos and Lumumba. His Pan-African consciousness and Afro-Argentine identity blend throughout his three decades of music and inspire solidarity, love, movement and unity.

== With Todos Tus Muertos ==
- Todos Tus Muertos (Universal Music, 1988)
- Nena De Hiroshima (Universal Music, 1991)
- Dale Aborigen (Herriak Gora, 1994)
- Argentina Te Asesina (Herriak Gora, 1995)
- Subversiones (TTM Records, 1996)
- El Camino Real (TTM Records, 1998)
- Greatest Hits (2008)

== With Mano Negra ==
- Casa Babylon (Virgin France S.A., 1994)

== With Lumumba ==
- Lumumba (1996)
- Raíces Y Cultura (1997)
- Se Viene El Bum (1999)
- En Vivo En Excursionistas (2000)

== Solo discography ==
- Canta Sobre Discos (2000)
- Cabeza Negra (2001)
- Repatriación (2001)
- Selassiei I Dios Todopoderoso (2001)
- En Vivo En México (2001)
- Brillando Por Negus (2002)
- Dame Una Alegría (2003)
- Amlak (2003)
- En Vivo En Japón (2003)
- Fuego Caliente (2004)
- Negrociación (2004)
- Puerta De Oro (2004)
- Trabajo De Hormiga (2005)
- Cosas Buenas (2005)
- Avanzando (2005)
- Guerreros Incansables (2006) (reprinted)
- Cabeza Negra (2006) (reprinted)
- Emocionado! (2007)
- International Love (2008)
- Crucial Cuts (2009)
- Forever Together! (2010)
- Vibraciones Positivas (2010)
- Arranque (2011)
- Llegó el Momento (2013)
- Tek a Ship (2015)
- Survival Time (2020)

== See also ==
- Todos Tus Muertos
- Lumumba
